= Infanta Branca, Lady of Guadalajara =

Blanche of Portugal
- Infanta
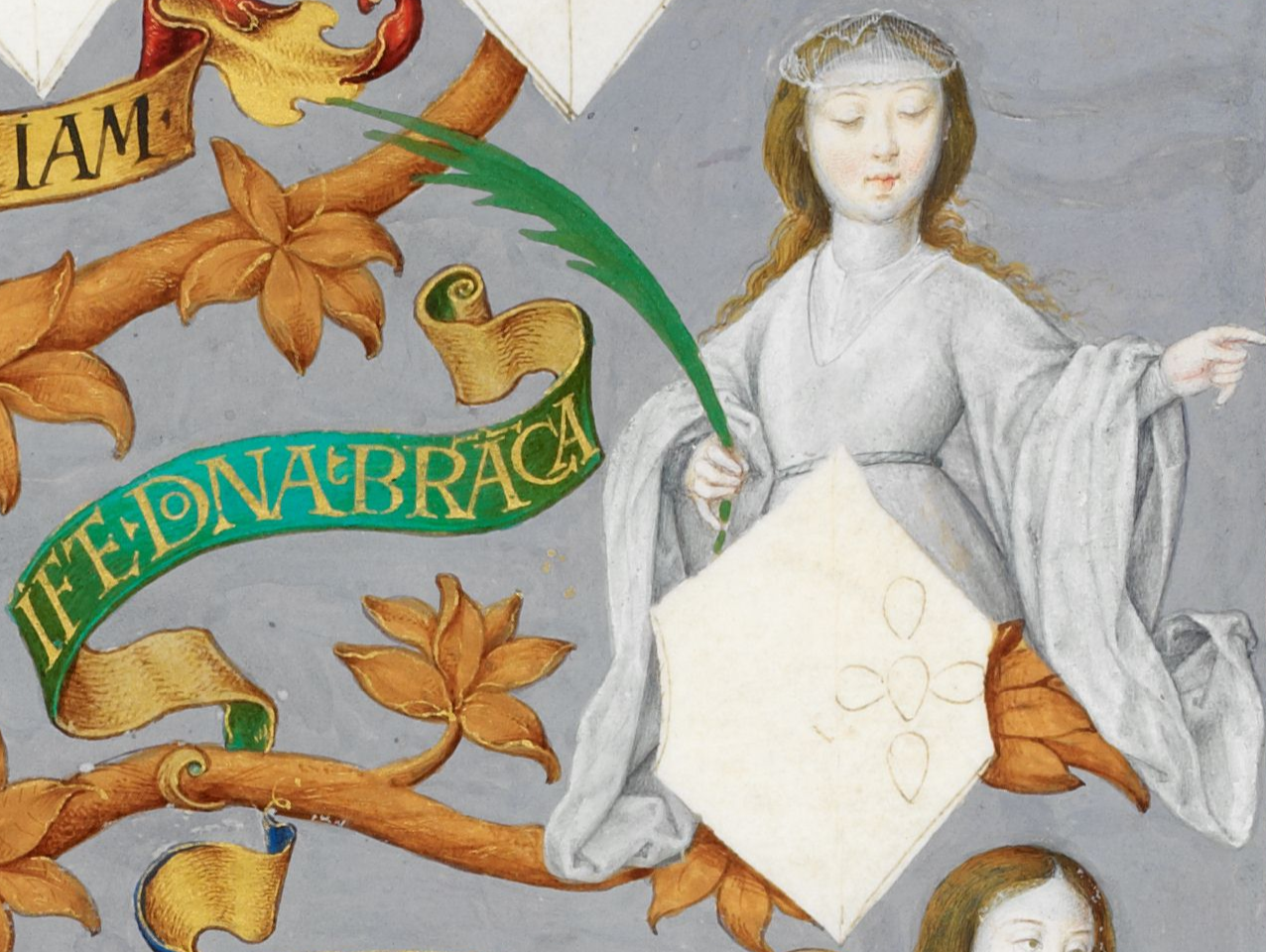
- Blanche of Portugal, in Antonio de Hollanda's Genealogy of the Royal Houses of Spain and Portugal (1530-1534)
- Born: 1198; Kingdom of Portugal
- Died: c. 1240; Guadalajara, Crown of Castile
- Burial: Santa Cruz Monastery, Coimbra, Portugal
- House: Portuguese House of Burgundy
- Father: Sancho I
- Mother: Dulce of Aragon
- Religion: Roman Catholicism

Branca of Portugal (1198 – Guadalajara, c. 1240; Portuguese pronunciation: [ˈbɾɐ̃kɐ]; English: Blanche) was a Portuguese infanta (princess), eighth child of Portuguese King Sancho I and Dulce of Aragon, was probably the twin sister of Berengaria, she was raised in the court with her father and his mistress "a Ribeirinha" and, when she was eight or ten years old, was sent to live with her sisters at the Monastery of Lorvão. She was a nun at a convent in Guadalajara and was interred at the Monastery of Santa Cruz in Coimbra where her mother was buried.

== Ancestry ==
Ancestors of Branca of Portugal

8. Henry, Count of Portugal
4. Afonso I of Portugal
9. Theresa, Countess of Portugal
2. Sancho I of Portugal
10. Amadeus III, Count of Savoy
5. Matilda of Savoy
11. Mahaut of Albon
1. Branca, Lady of Guadalajara
12. Ramon Berenguer III, Count of Barcelona
6. Ramon Berenguer IV, Count of Barcelona
13. Douce I, Countess of Provence
3. Dulce of Aragon
14. Ramiro II of Aragon
7. Petronilla of Aragon
15. Agnes of Aquitaine

== Bibliography ==
- Rodrigues Oliveira, Ana (2010). Rainhas medievais de Portugal. Dezassete mulheres, duas dinastias, quatro séculos de História (in Portuguese). Lisbon: A esfera dos livros. ISBN 978-989-626-261-7.
