= Theresa of Portugal, Countess of Flanders =

Theresa of Portugal
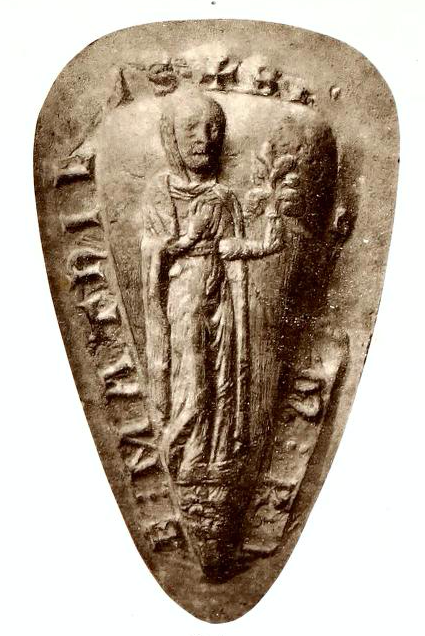
- Theresa's effigy in a seal

Countess consort of Flanders
- Tenure: 1183–1191

Duchess consort of Burgundy
- Tenure: 1194–1195
- Born: 1151; Coimbra, Kingdom of Portugal
- Died: 6 May 1218 (aged 66–67); Veurne, Flanders
- Burial: Clairvaux Abbey, Aube
- Spouse: Philip I, Count of Flanders; Odo III, Duke of Burgundy
- House: Portuguese House of Burgundy
- Father: Afonso I of Portugal
- Mother: Matilda of Savoy

Theresa of Portugal (Note: Known as Matilda in Flanders.) (Portuguese: Teresa or Tereza, [tɨˈɾezɐ]; Archaic Portuguese: Tarasia; 1151 – 1218) was Countess of Flanders by marriage to Philip I, Count of Flanders, and Duchess of Burgundy by marriage to Odo III, Duke of Burgundy. She was the daughter of the Portuguese king Afonso I and Matilda of Savoy. She served as co-regent of Portugal with her brother during the illness of their father Afonso I of Portugal from 1172 until 1173, and regent of Flanders in 1191 during the interim period after the death of her spouse and the accession of his heir.

== Regent of Portugal ==
Theresa was the daughter of the Portuguese king Afonso I and Matilda of Savoy. Theresa, her brother Sancho, and sister Urraca were the only children of Afonso and Matilda to survive to adulthood. Named after her paternal grandmother, Countess Theresa, she was reputedly King Afonso I's favourite.

During their father's illness, Sancho at first exercised regency alone but from 1172 he shared the government with Theresa. At that time Afonso started considering to allow Theresa to succeed to the throne, and in 1173 he declared Sancho and Theresa co-heirs. As Afonso's illness progressed, the role of the siblings increased. Sancho took over military matters, while Theresa assumed administrative functions.

She was called queen because she was a regent of the kingdom of her father.

Due to her proximity to the throne and fears of a loss of independence, a marriage with an Iberian lord was undesirable. Theresa thus remained unmarried until relatively late.

== Countess of Flanders ==
Around 1183 envoys came from the County of Flanders to ask for Theresa's hand in marriage to Count Philip. Perhaps because of the difficulty of pronouncing her name, she became known as Matilda. Her marriage was celebrated (in the Tournai Cathedral, Bruges) after the death of Elisabeth of Vermandois, first wife of Philip, who hadn't given him any children, and was because Philip needed an heir so that his county wouldn't fall into French hands. For its part, Portugal, a new-born country, managed to secure an important alliance with Flanders, and European recognition. Theresa brought a considerable dowry, something that helped Philip manage his war with France for a couple of more years, before making peace in 1186. A reasonable number of Portuguese immigrants (mainly merchants) also went to Flanders with the infanta.

Theresa lived in one of the most luxurious courts of Europe, in which Philip patronized Chrétien de Troyes, author of a famous cycle of Arthurian stories and one of the fathers of the Holy Grail theme in literature. However, like Elisabeth of Vermandois, Theresa never gave birth, and after Philip's death, the county passed to his sister, Margaret I, and her husband, Baldwin VIII.

After Philip's death in August 1191, Theresa, holding extensive dower lands in southern and coastal Flanders, was powerful enough to challenge the rule of her sister-in-law and brother-in-law, provoking unrest among the public in her dower lands by raising the taxes and becoming a central figure of the part of the nobility opposing the succession of Margaret and Baldwin, but was forced to relent.

== Duchess of Burgundy ==
In 1193, Theresa married again, this time to Odo III, Duke of Burgundy. Her second marriage produced no children, and so, she ended up being repudiated by the Duke, so that he could marry Alice of Vergy. She returned to Flanders and would be instrumental in arranging the marriage of her nephew Ferdinand to Margaret I and Baldwin VIII's granddaughter, Joan, Countess of Flanders.

Theresa died when her carriage accidentally fell into a marsh near Veurne where she drowned.

She is celebrated in Bruges every year.

== Sources ==
- Nicholas, David M. (1992). Medieval Flanders. Routledge.
- Nicholson, Helen J. (2023). Women and the Crusades. Oxford University Press.

Royal titles
| Vacant Title last held by Elisabeth of Vermandois | Countess consort of Flanders; 1183–1191 | Vacant Title next held by Marie of Champagne |
| Vacant Title last held by Béatrice of Albon | Duchess consort of Burgundy; 1194–1195 | Vacant Title next held by Alice of Vergy |
