= Wamba, Valladolid =

Wamba
- Municipality
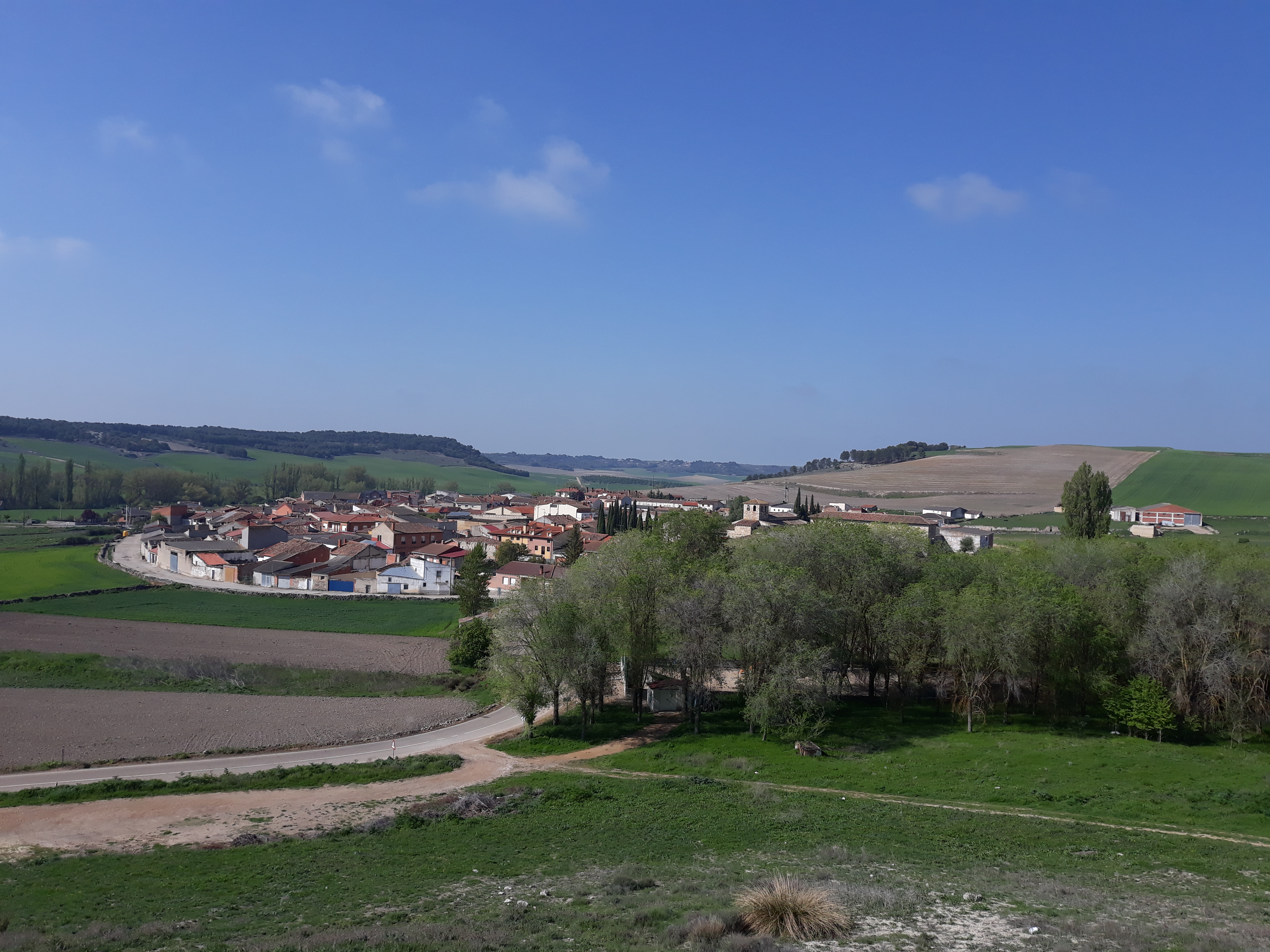

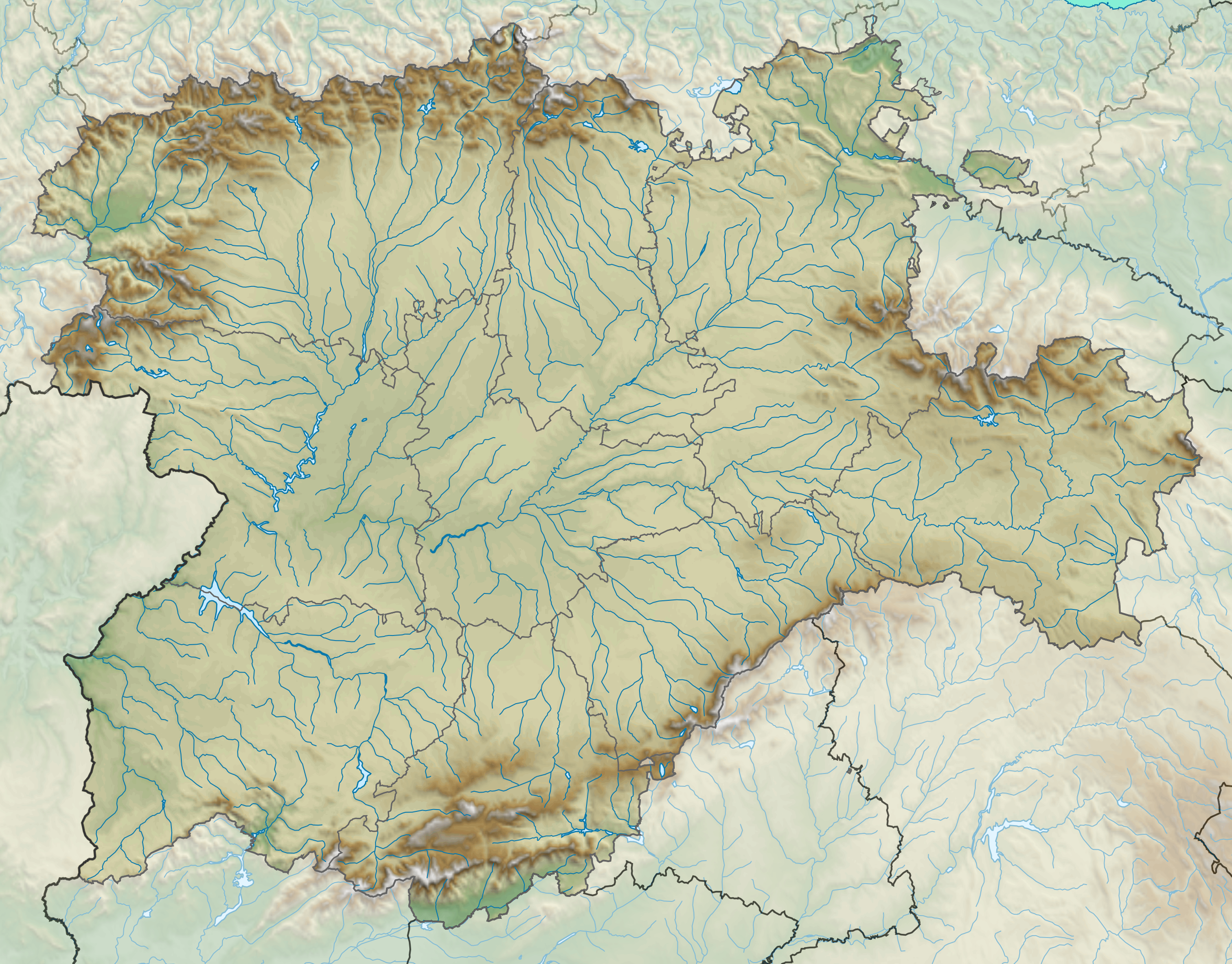
- Location in Spain Wamba (Castile and León)
- Coordinates: 41°40′35″N 4°55′03″W
- Country: Spain
- Autonomous community: Castile and León
- Province: Valladolid

Area
  - Total: 38.16 km^{2} (14.73 sq mi)

Population (2025-01-01)
  - Total: 289
  - Density: 7.57/km^{2} (19.6/sq mi)
- Time zone: UTC+1 (CET)

Wamba is a municipality of Spain located in the province of Valladolid, Castile and León. The municipality spans across a total area of 38.16 km^{2} and, as of 1 January 2020, it has a registered population of 310.

== Location ==
It lies on the southeast part of the shire of Montes Torozos. It borders the municipalities of Peñaflor de Hornija, Villanubla, Ciguñuela, Valladolid (for an enclave of the municipality), Castrodeza and Torrelobatón.

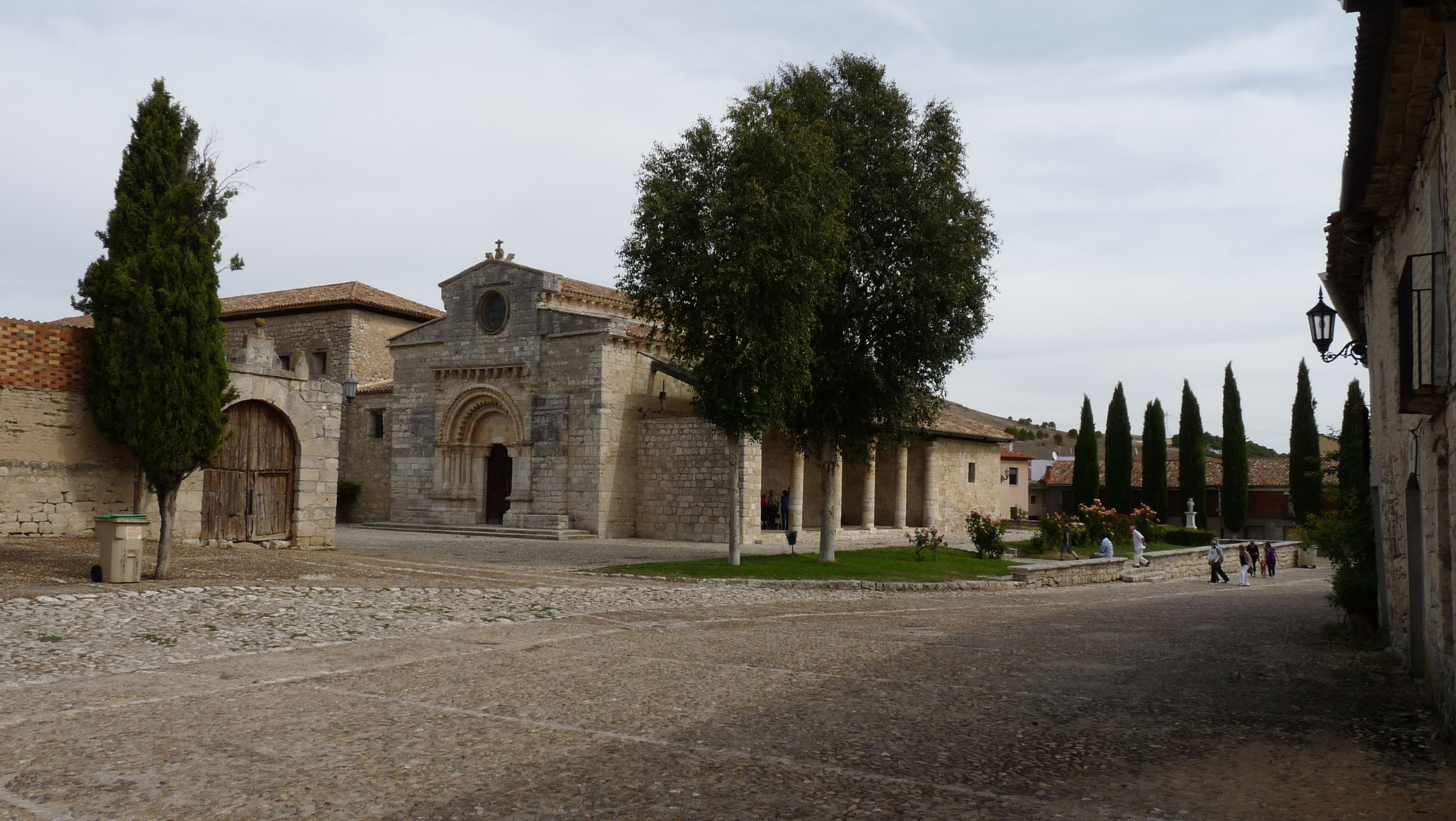
St. Mary's Church

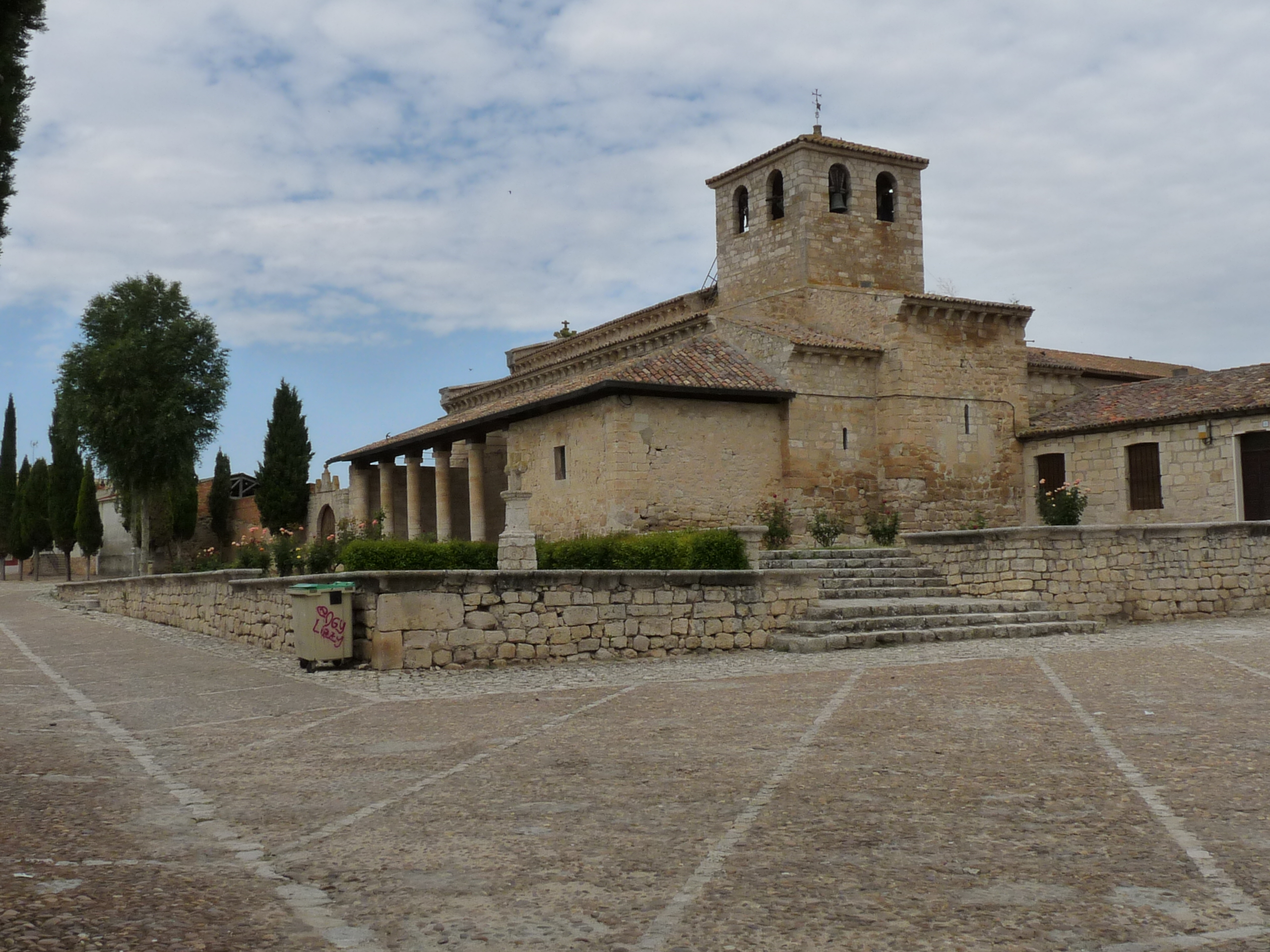
Another view of St. Mary's Church

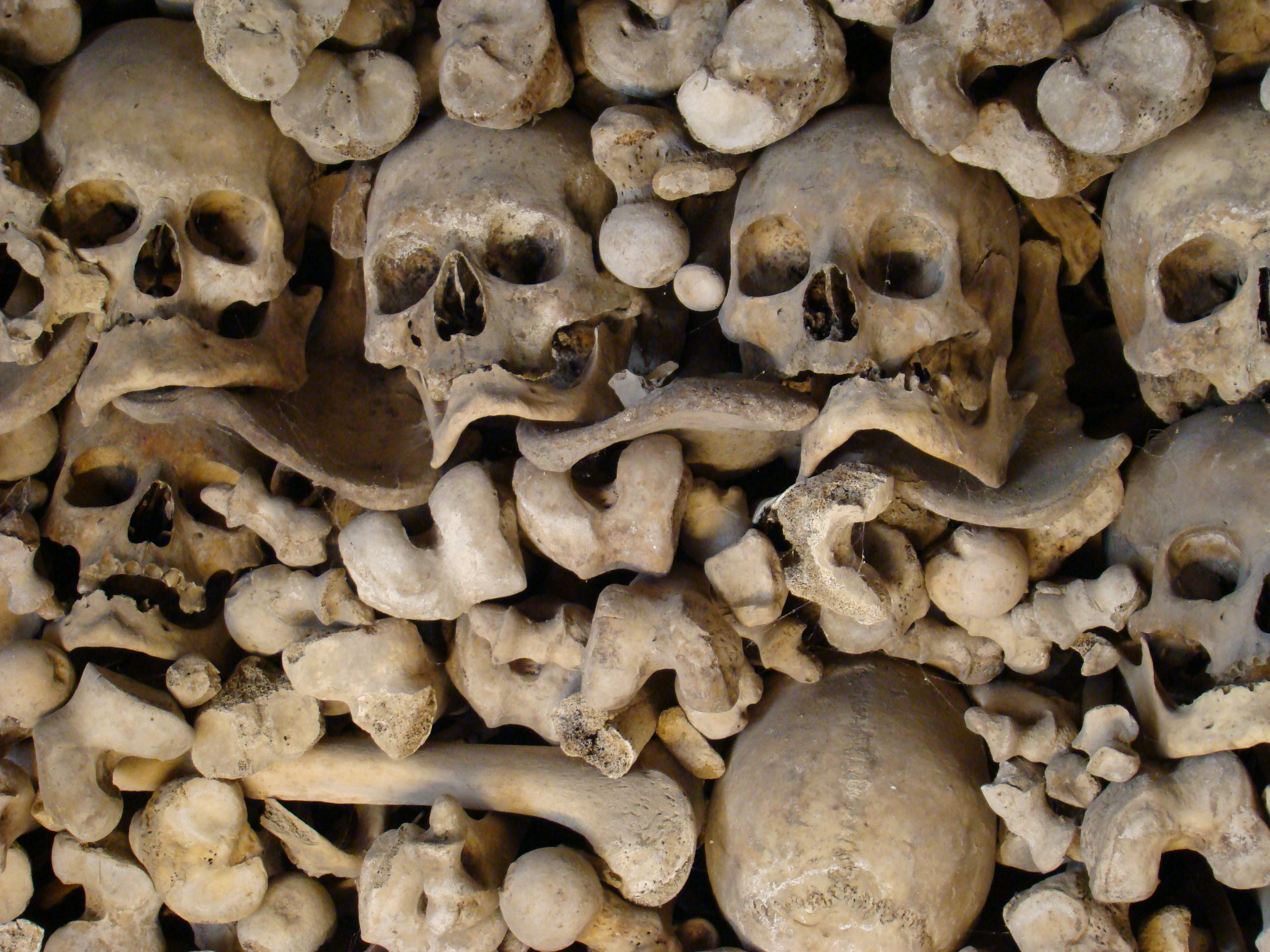
Ossuary with skeletons from the 13th to 18th century

The settlement is located on the Camino de Santiago de Madrid, one of the variants of the Way of St James.

== Toponymy ==
Its name comes from the Gothic King Wamba, who was elected king in that city in the year 672. At that time it was called Gérticos and King Recceswinth had a villa there resting. As Receswinth died in this town, the nobles elected Wamba immediately that day.

Notably, Wamba is the only municipality in Spain whose name begins with the letter W.

== Monuments ==
=== St Mary's Church ===
The existence of a Visigothic church at Wamba is known: remains of its decoration are preserved in the Archaeological Museum of Valladolid. It seems likely that during the repopulation of this area after the reconquest, a then existing church from the time of Receswinth was rebuilt. The resulting building was perhaps the first Mozarabic church in the area. It has been suggested that Wamba was repopulated by people coming from the north and that for this reason St Mary's architecture is much closer to Visigothic and Asturian influences than is the contemporary church at San Cebrián de Mazote, which was repopulated by Christians who came from Al-Andalus.

From the Mozarabic church only the East End is preserved, the first installment of the naves and the entire north wall, while the rest was replaced and expanded in the late twelfth century, when Santa María de Wamba became dependent on the Knights Hospitaller of the Order of St. John of Jerusalem. Its shape was that of a rectangle 18m long by 12m wide, divided into nine areas with horseshoe arches on pillars, to which a header, the same width as the rest of the church, is joined consisting of three rectangular apses with the central apse protruding. Unlike the plan of San Cebrian, Mazote, the inner shape of the three apses is rectangular.

In the part of the church rebuilt by the Knights Hospitaller in the twelfth century, Cistercian style, we can also consider a compartment attached to the north transept, of uncertain date, covered by vaults with central column, several paintings and sculptures from different periods and an ossuary in the even that retain some of the thousands of skeletons deposited along the thirteenth to eighteenth centuries.

In the church of Santa Maria was buried the Queen Urraca of Portugal, wife of King Ferdinand II of León and mother of King Alfonso IX of León. After her marriage was annulled, she was a nun in the Order of St. John of Jerusalem. In the call Chapel Queen is placed an epitaph, after the death of Queen Urraca of Portugal, which is related to that queen, daughter of Afonso I of Portugal and his wife Matilda of Savoy, Queen of Portugal, was buried in this church.

It had a huge ossuary over 3000 skulls of monks, three quarters of these have been taken by the University for the students to use for research.

== Gallery of the ossuary ==
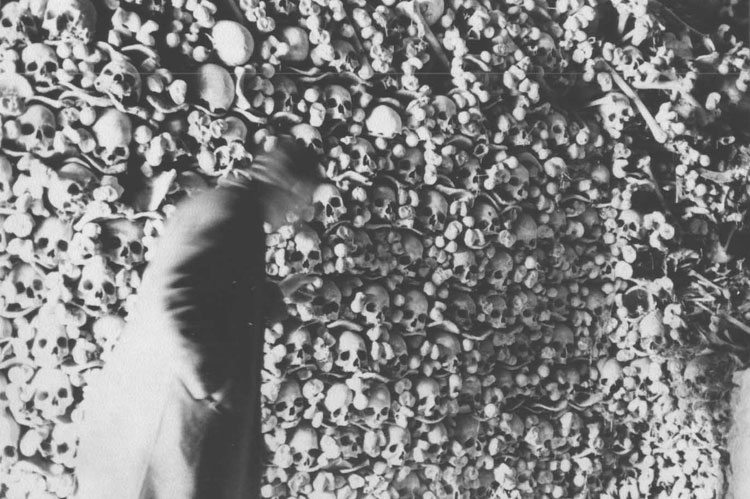

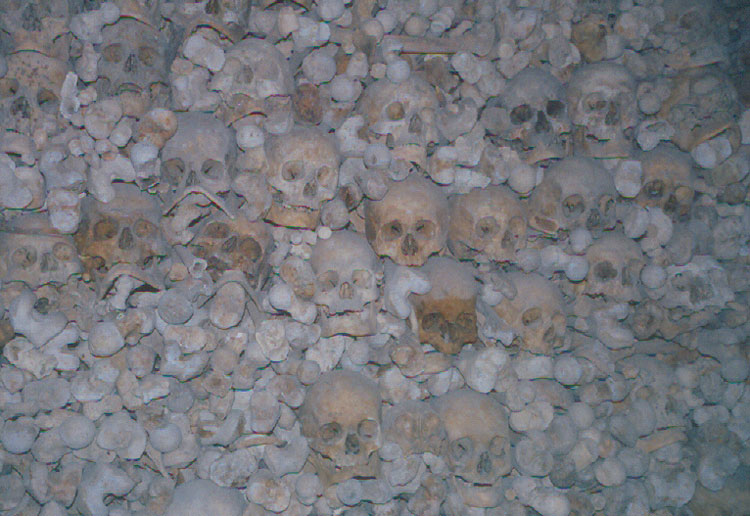

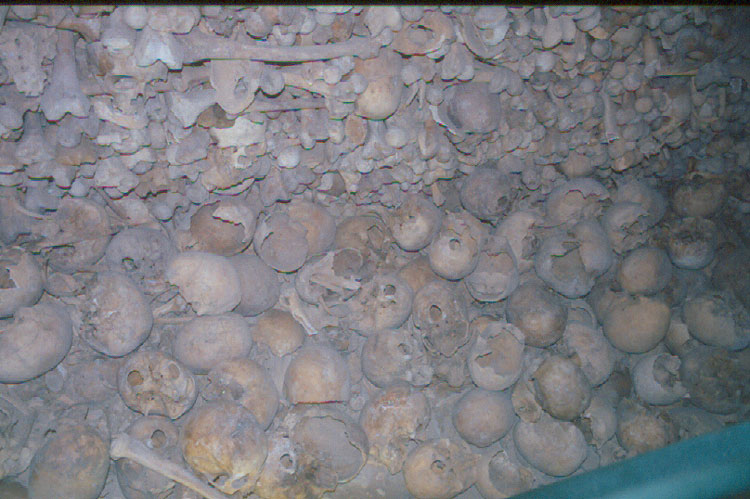

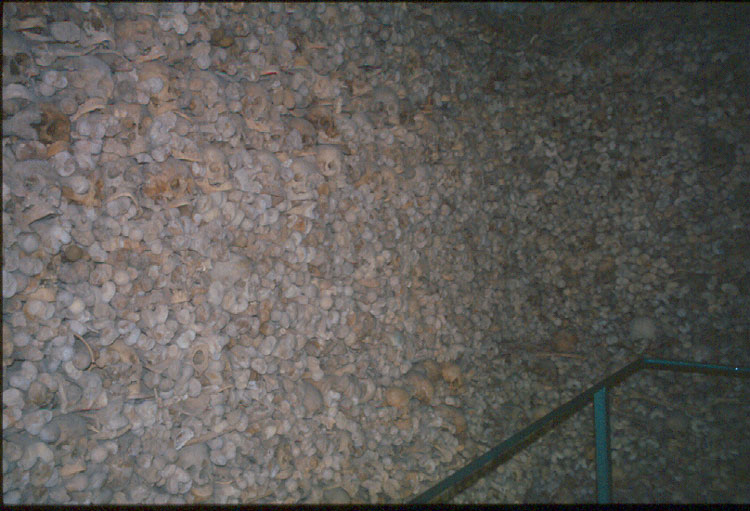

== See also ==
- Cuisine of the province of Valladolid
