= Sancha, Lady of Alenquer =

Blessed Sancha
- Lady of Alenquer, Titular Queen of Portugal
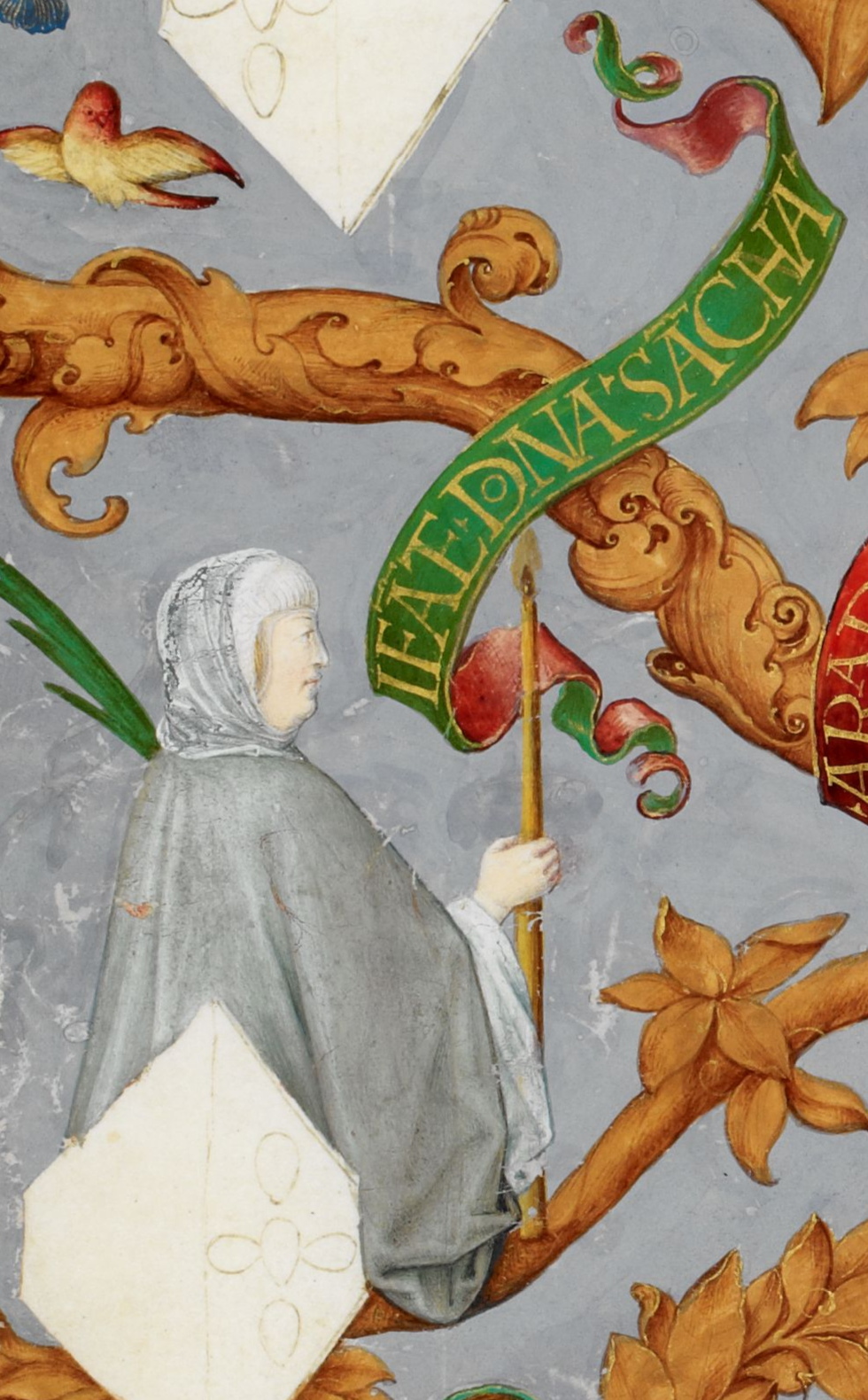
- Infanta Sancha, in Antonio de Hollanda's Genealogy of the Royal Houses of Spain and Portugal (1530-1534)
- Reign: 1212-1223 (as titular queen) 1212-1229 (as lady of Alenquer)
- Born: 1180; Coimbra, Kingdom of Portugal
- Died: 13 March 1229 (aged 48–49); Celas Monastery, Celas, Kingdom of Portugal
- Burial: Lorvão Abbey, Portugal
- House: Portuguese House of Burgundy
- Father: Sancho I
- Mother: Dulce of Aragon
- Religion: Roman Catholicism

Blessed Sancha of Portugal O. Cist
- Resting place: Monastery of Lorvão, Lorvão, Portugal
- Honored in: Catholic Church
- Beatified: 13 December 1705 by Pope Clement XI
- Feast: 20 june

Sancha of Portugal (Portuguese pronunciation: [ˈsɐ̃ʃɐ]; 1180 in Coimbra – 13 March 1229 in Celas Monastery), was a Portuguese infanta, second daughter of King Sancho I of Portugal and Dulce of Aragon.

== Life ==
She was born 1180 and was the feudal Lady of Alenquer.

Sancha and her sisters Teresa and Malfada were very wealthy, having inherited large estates after the death of their father in 1211. In 1212, their brother Ferdinand married Joan, Countess of Flanders and was imprisoned by the French after Battle of Bouvines in 1214.

Their brother, King Afonso II of Portugal contested ownership of his sisters' castles of Seia, Alenquer and Montemor-o-Novo and their right to use the title of queen. Afonso wanted to centralize power and feared that this could create a problem of sovereignty that could come to divide the country. Much of the Portuguese nobles sided with the princesses, but they were defeated. The king's brother Peter, had also sided with his sisters and was banished. On the death of Afonso II, his son Sancho II granted some lands and castles to his aunts but he made them renounce the title of princess-queen. The final peace came in 1223.

In 1219, she welcomed the Franciscan Berard of Carbio and his companions to Alenquer. Upon hearing that they planned to go to Morocco to preach the Gospel, she provided them with laymen's clothes so they could pass through Seville, which remained under Muslem rule.

A significant portion of her wealth she spent on acquiring property to establish and support her monastery. Sancha founded the Monastery Santa Maria de Celas, near Coibra, around January 1223. Part of the work of the nuns at Celas was the care of the sick. It later affiliated with the Cistercian order.

Sancha died at the Monastery Santa Maria de Celas. Her body was moved to Lorvão Abbey by her sister Theresa of Portugal.

On 13 December 1705 she was beatified by Pope Clement XI's papal bull Sollicitudo Pastoralis Offici, along with her sister Theresa of Portugal. Her feast day and that of her two sisters Teresa and Mafalda is 20 June.

== Bibliography ==
- Carvalho Correia, Francisco (2008). O Mosteiro de Santo Tirso, de 978 a 1588: A silhueta de uma entidade projectada no chao de uma história milenária (in Portuguese). Santiago de Compostela: Facultade de Xeografía e História. Universidade de Santiago de Compostela. ISBN 978-8498-8703-81. Archived from the original on October 4, 2013.
- Rodrigues Oliveira, Ana (2010). Rainhas medievais de Portugal. Dezassete mulheres, duas dinastias, quatro séculos de História (in Portuguese). Lisbon: A esfera dos livros. ISBN 978-989-626-261-7.
- Pizarro, José Augusto de Sottomayor (1997). Linhagens Medievais Portuguesas: Genealogias e Estratégias (1279-1325) (in Portuguese). Porto: Thesis, published by author. hdl:10216/18023.
