= Lorvão Abbey =

Monastery in Penacova, Portugal

- Mosteiro de Santa Maria de Lorvão
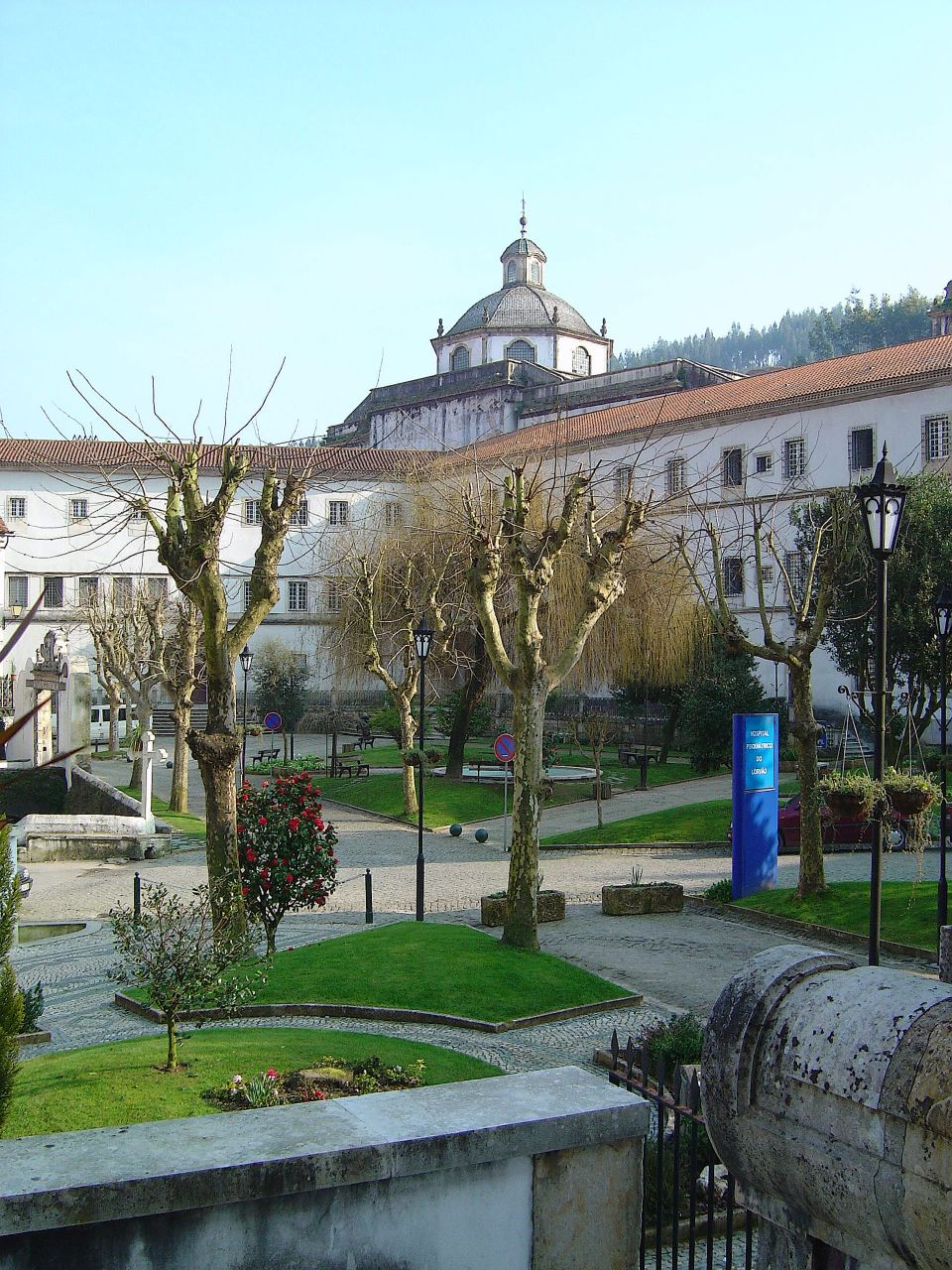
- View of the old abbey cloister and of the lantern tower of the abbey church
- Interactive map of Lorvão Abbey

Monastery information
- Full name: Abbey of Our Lady of Lorvão
- Other names: Monastery of Sts. Mammes & Pelagius (Mosteiro de Sãos Mamede e Pelágio)
- Order: Benedictine monks (ca. 1070-1206), Cistercian nuns (1206-1887)
- Established: ca. 880
- Disestablished: 1887
- Dedication: Sts. Mammes of Caesarea & Pelagius the Hermit (880-1206), Our Lady of Life
- Diocese: Coimbra

People
- Founder: Hermenegildo Gutiérrez
- Important associated figures: Teresa of Portugal, Sancha, Lady of Alenquer

Architecture
- Status: suppressed
- Functional status: museum
- Heritage designation: National Monument
- Designated date: 1910
- Architect: Mateus Vicente de Oliveira, João Mendes Ribeiro
- Style: Baroque

Site
- Location: Lorvão, Penacova, Coimbra, Portugal
- Coordinates: 40°15′33″N 8°19′03″W

The Abbey of Our Lady of Lorvão (Portuguese: Mosteiro de Santa Maria de Lorvão), known simply as Lorvão Abbey, was a monastery in the civil parish of Lorvão in the Coimbra District of Portugal. According to tradition, it was founded in the 6th century, but no documentation of the foundation exists until the late 9th century, the period of the Christian Reconquest of the lands, which had then been held by Muslim conquerors for over 150 years. It served a monastic community for a thousand years. Originally housing a community of monks, it initially prospered as a major point of trade between the Christian inhabitants to its north and the Muslim kingdoms to its south. During the 12th century, its workshops were noted for their magnificent illuminated manuscripts. Soon after that, its monks were removed and the monastery became the home of a community of nuns. They occupied the site until the abolition of religious orders in Portugal during the 19th century.

At the start of the 20th century, the buildings were converted into a psychiatric hospital, at the same time being declared a National Monument of the country. The hospital lasted a century and the government is currently developing the property into a museum of the sacred arts under the supervision of the architect João Mendes Ribeiro.

== Early history ==
The region became Muslim-held soon after the Muslim invasion of the Iberian peninsula in 711. Under the leadership of King Alfonso III of Asturias and his Castellan, Hermenegildo Gutiérrez, they were driven out of the region of Coimbra in 878, when Gutiérrez was made Count of Portugal. The monastery was dedicated to the Saints Mammes of Caesarea and Pelagius the Hermit. The community initially prospered as a major point of trade between the Christian inhabitants to its north and the Muslim kingdoms to its south. The monastery fell upon hard times when Muslim forces retook the territory in the following century. This lasted until the permanent retaking of the land in 1064 by King Ferdinand I of León.

At that point, the monastery was entrusted to the Benedictine monks of Cluny Abbey in France, who were made responsible for the agrarian development of the surrounding region. During the second half of the 12th century, major renovations of the monastery were undertaken by King Alfonso I. A new cloister and a larger church, with three naves, were erected. Under the leadership of Abbot João (1162-1192) the scriptorium of the abbey became noted for their magnificent illuminated manuscripts. This abbey and the nearby Abbey of Santa Cruz, a community of canon regulars, became the preeminent producers of manuscripts in the young kingdom, in answer to a growing demand. Two major examples of this handicraft still survive, both illuminated by a monk named Egeas. One, known as the Book of Birds, a bestiary, is the illustration of a manuscript by the contemporary canon regular Hugues de Fouilloy and dated 1184. The other, known as the Apocalypse of Lorvão, is an illumination of the Commentary on the Apocalypse by Beatus of Liébana, an 8th century monk, dated 1189.

=== Cistercian nuns ===
In 1206, the marriage of King Alfonso IX of León to Teresa of Portugal, daughter of King Sancho I of Portugal, was annulled by the Holy See due to consanguinity. She returned to her home, where her father gave her Lorvão Abbey. She chose to have the monks removed and established a community of 300 nuns, who were to live under the Cistercian Rule, with herself as abbess, though she herself was unable to take religious vows until after the death of her husband in 1230. The abbey was rededicated to Our Lady of Life. She died there in 1250 and was buried there, as had been her sister Sancha of Portugal (+1229), who had experienced a similar life story and had died as the Abbess of Celas.

Major renovations of the abbey were undertaken on an ongoing basis during the 16-17th centuries, giving it a Baroque style. The new church (1748-1761) was designed by Mateus Vicente de Oliveira.

== Suppression ==
A civil war broke out in Portugal 1828-1834. At its conclusion, the victorious Liberal government made the decision to end state sponsorship of religious communities. They were inspired by the Suppression of the Society of Jesus during the previous century. Thus in May 1834 King Pedro IV declared the Dissolution of the monasteries in Portugal, intending to sell the seized properties to provide for the poor. The first stage of the government action was applied only to communities of men, which were immediately suppressed. In 1862, the law was applied to communities of women, who were barred from accepting new members, and their assets became subject to seizure. The abbey library was seized in the early 1880's, when the above-noted manuscripts were transferred to the National Library. The last nun of the community died in 1887, ending the monastic life of the abbey.

== Legacy ==
In the 20th century, the abbey was made into a psychiatric hospital. In 1910 the properties were declared a National Monument. The hospital was closed in 2012. It has been developed into a museum focusing on the sacred arts.

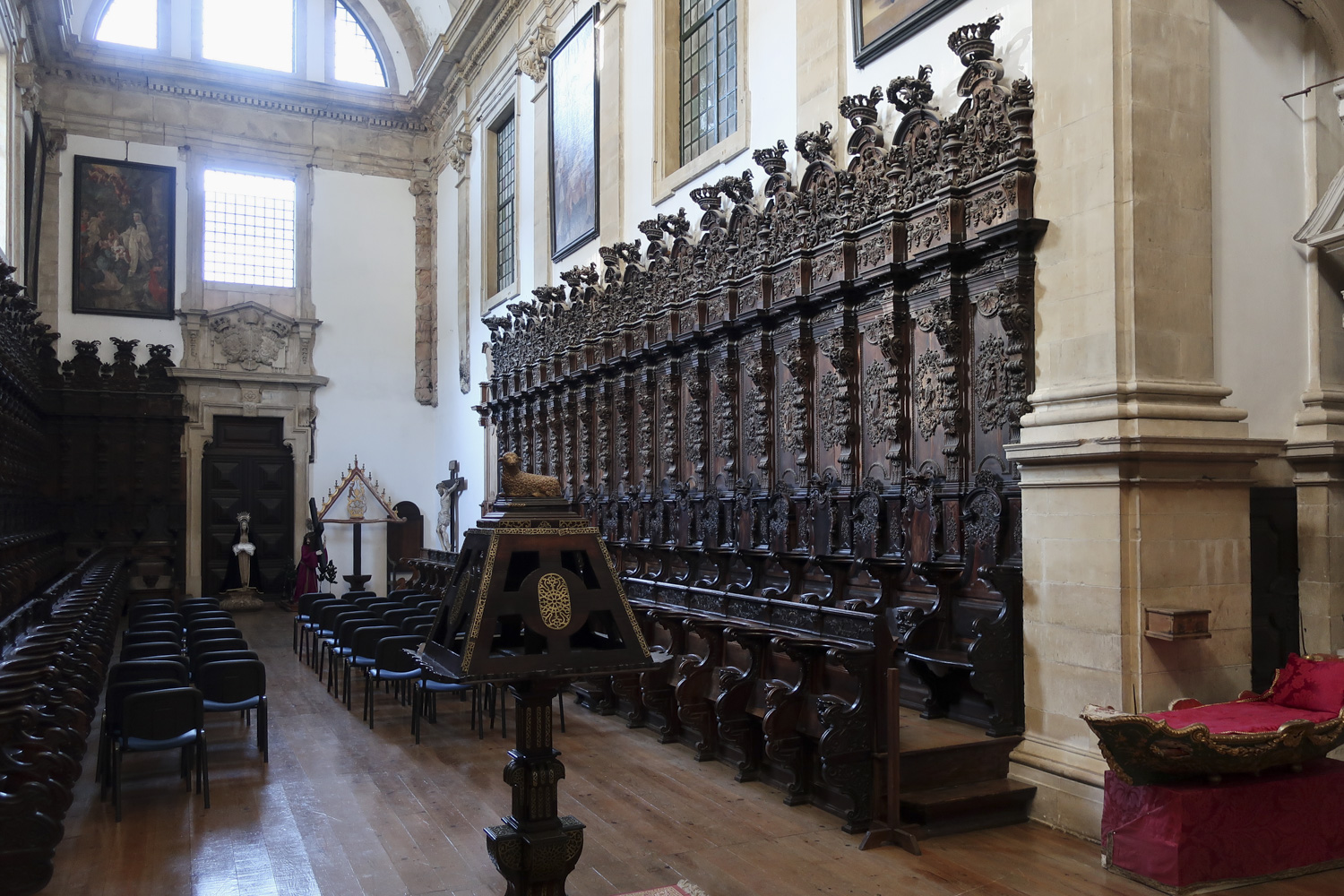
Choir
