= Mafalda of Portugal (born 1153) =

Portuguese Princess

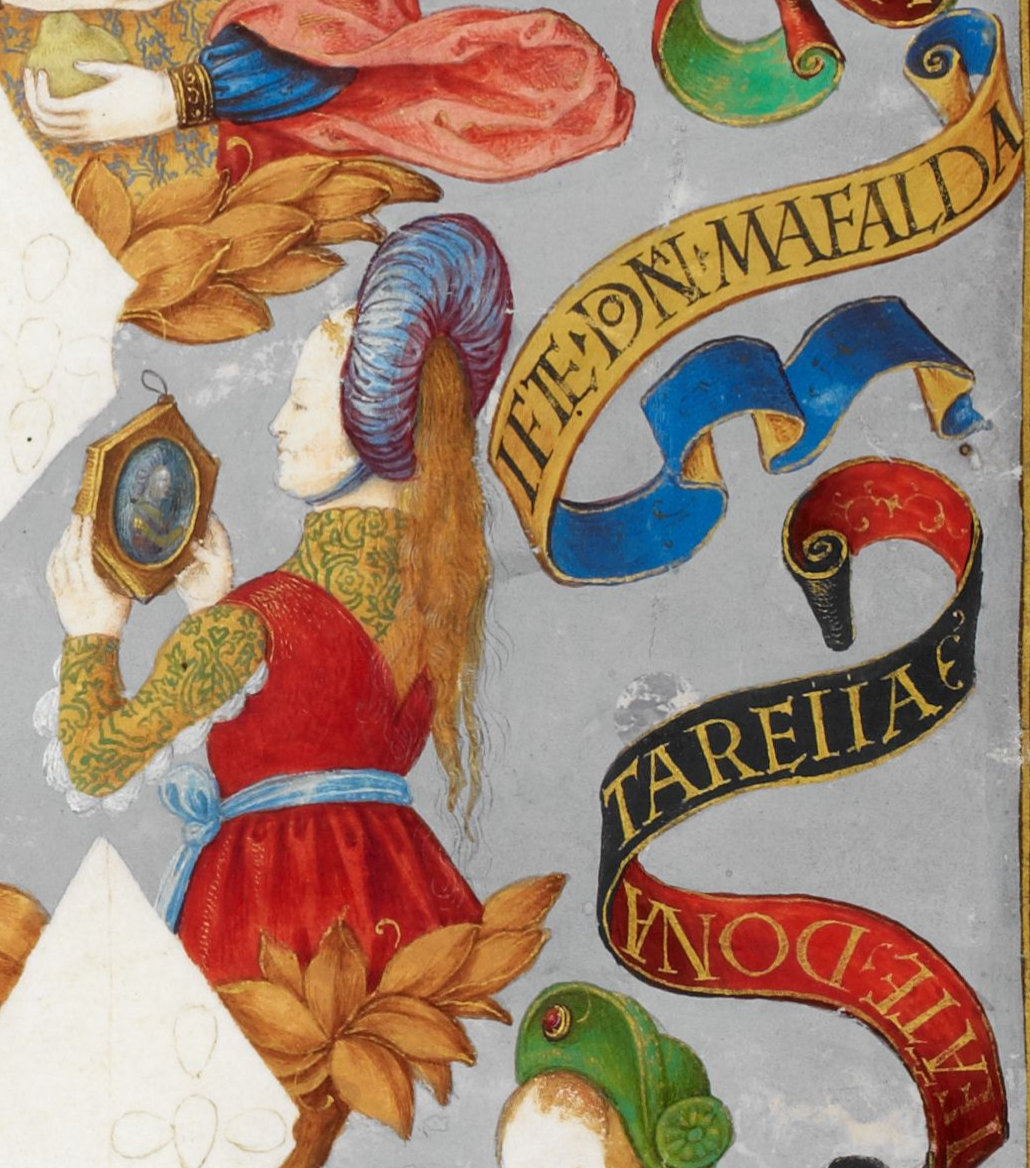
- Mafalda in Genealogy of the Kings of Portugal (António de Holanda, 1530–1534)
- Born: 1153; Coimbra
- Died: after 1162; Coimbra
- House: Portuguese House of Burgundy
- Father: Afonso I of Portugal
- Mother: Matilda of Savoy

Mafalda of Portugal (1153, Coimbra – after 1162) was a Portuguese infanta, the fourth legitimate child and third daughter of Afonso Henriques (the first king of Portugal) and his wife Mafalda of Savoy.

In January 1160, her father and Ramón Berenguer IV, Count of Barcelona, negotiated the marriage of Mafalda to Alfonso, future King Alfonso II of Aragon who was three or four years old at that time. After the death of Ramón Berenguer IV in the summer of 1162, King Ferdinand II of León convinced his widow, Queen Petronilla, to cancel the infante's wedding plans with Mafalda and for Alfonso to marry instead Sancha, daughter Alfonso VII of León and his second wife Queen Richeza of Poland.

This did not compromise the establishment of long-lived good relations between Portugal and Aragon, since Mafalda's younger brother Infante Sancho (future Sancho I of Portugal) married Dulce Infanta of Aragon, sister of Alfonso II in 1174.

== Bibliography ==
- Caetano de Souza, Antonio (1735). Historia Genealógica de la Real Casa Portuguesa (PDF) (in Portuguese). Vol. I. Lisbon: Lisboa Occidental, na oficina de Joseph Antonio da Sylva. ISBN 978-84-8109-908-9.
- Mattoso, José (2014). D. Afonso Henriques (in Portuguese). Lisbon: Temas e Debates. ISBN 978-972-759-911-0.
- Rodrigues Oliveira, Ana (2010). Rainhas medievais de Portugal. Dezassete mulheres, duas dinastias, quatro séculos de História (in Portuguese). Lisbon: A esfera dos livros. ISBN 978-989-626-261-7.
