= Alice of Vergy =

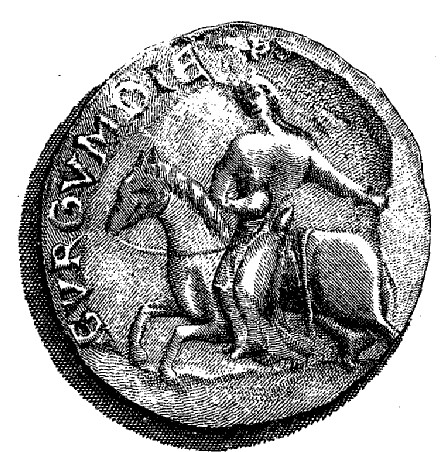

Duchess consort of Burgundy
- Tenure: 1199–1218
- Born: 1182
- Died: 1251
- Spouse: Odo III, Duke of Burgundy
- Issue: Joan; Alice; Hugh IV, Duke of Burgundy; Beatrice
- House: House of Vergy
- Father: Hugues, Seigneur de Vergy
- Mother: Gillette de Trainel

Alice (or Alix) de Vergy (1182–1251) was duchess of Burgundy as the second wife of Odo III, Duke of Burgundy. She served as regent of Burgundy during the minority of her son (1218–28).

== Biography ==
Alice was the daughter of Hugh, Lord de Vergy, and Gillette de Trainel. Her marriage was arranged in 1196 as part of the peace between her father and Odo, who had been engaged in a long-lasting conflict, and took place in 1199. As a dowry, she was granted several of her father's lands, while Odo granted her father undisputed ownership of his land. Upon Odo's death in 1218, the duke was succeeded by his son with Alice, Hugh IV. As Hugh was only five at the time, Alice became the regent of Burgundy during his minority, serving with the title "Ducissa mater ducis Bourgogne".

As regent, Alice worked to secure the inheritance of her son, and received the vassals' oath of loyalty in his place. In 1225, she managed to prevent a conflict with the dauphin of Viennois, from whom she acquired Beaune and Chalon by way of purchase as a means of ensuring peace. In 1227, she signed an alliance with the count of Champagne against the count of Nevers.

In 1228, her son was declared of legal majority, and Alice resigned her regency, leaving court in order to retire to her dower lands. However, in 1231, she acted as her son's representative in successfully resolving the conflict between the vicomte de Dijon and the abbey of Citeaux. She spent her long retirement as an appreciated benefactress of religious communities.

== Family ==
In 1199, she married Odo III, Duke of Burgundy. Their children were:

- Joan (1200–1223), married Raoul II of Lusignan (died 1250), Seigneur d'Issoudun and Count of Eu.
- Alice (1204–1266), married Robert I (died 1262), Count of Clermont and Dauphin of Auvergne
- Hugh IV (1213–1272), successor to the Duchy
- Beatrice (born 1216), married Humbert III of Thoire (died 1279)

== Sources ==
- Adamo, Phillip C. (2014). New Monks in Old Habits: The Formation of the Caulite Monastic Order, 1193-1267. Pontifical Institute of Mediaeval Studies.
- Demarthe, Sylvain (2015). "Alix de Vergy et l'architecture religieuse en Bourgogne dans la première moitié du XIIIe siècle". Bulletin du centre d'études médiévales d'Auxerre. 19 (2).

Alice of Vergy House of Vergy Born: 1182 Died: 1252
Royal titles
Preceded by Theresa of Portugal	Duchess consort of Burgundy; 1199–1218	Succeeded by Yolande of Dreux
