= Dulce of Aragon =

Queen of Portugal from 1185 to 1198

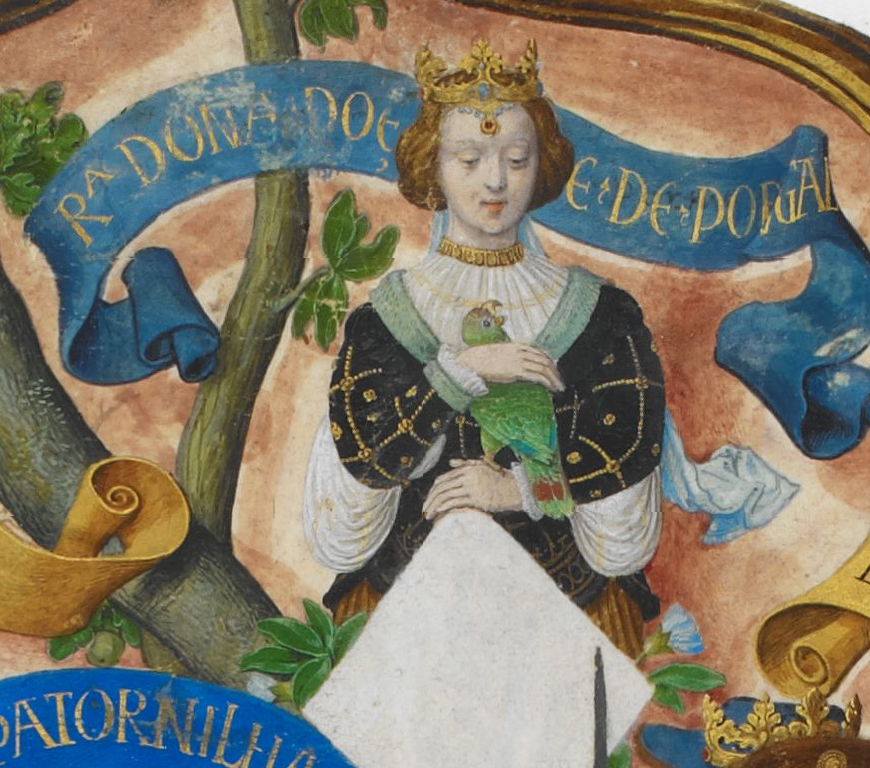

Queen consort of Portugal
- Tenure: 1185–1198
- Born: 1160; Barcelona, Crown of Aragon
- Died: 1198 (aged 37–38); Coimbra, Kingdom of Portugal
- Burial: Monastery of Santa Cruz in Coimbra
- Spouse: Sancho I of Portugal
- Issue: See Descendants
- House: Barcelona
- Father: Ramon Berenguer IV, Count of Barcelona
- Mother: Petronilla of Aragon

Dulce of Aragon (Note: "Dulce de Aragón, hija de Ramón Berenguer IV de Barcelona") (Note: "Dulce de Aragão, filha de Raimundo Berenguer IV...") also called Dulce of Barcelona, (1160–1198) was Queen of Portugal as the wife of King Sancho I of Portugal.

== Life ==
Dulce (also known as Doce or Aldonça) was the eldest daughter of Queen Petronila of Aragon and Count Ramon Berenguer IV of Barcelona. She was the sister of the future King Alfonso II of Aragon. Dulce´s father died in 1162 and her mother died in 1172.

Dulce's betrothal to infante Sancho, son of Afonso Henriques, the first king of Portugal, was celebrated when she was eleven years old and the marriage in 1174. The political reason behind this marriage was to stabilize Portugal as an independent country. There were many enemies of the crown, starting with the Kingdom of León that had controlled Portugal as a vassal state until 1128. In addition, the Catholic church was slow to consecrate Portugal's independence with its blessing. (This would not happen until 1179.)

Portugal therefore sought allies within the Iberian Peninsula, in particular with the kingdom of Aragon, a traditional enemy of Castile, which became the first country to recognize Portugal. At the same time, the marriage compensated for the broken engagement of her husband's sister, Infanta Mafalda with her brother, the future King Alfonso II of Aragon.

Not much is known about her life prior to her arrival in Portugal or of the wedding tokens she received upon her marriage. Dulce gave birth to her first daughter in 1176,

With the death of King Afonso Henriques in 1185, her husband ascended the throne and she became Queen consort of Portugal. In his first will, executed in 1188, her husband gave her the income from Alenquer, of the lands along the banks of the Vouga River, of Santa Maria da Feira and of Porto.

Sancho was not faithful to her and kept several mistresses; such as Maria Pais Ribeira, Maria Aires Fornelos, and from this and relationships he had several illegitemate children.

Dulce´s involvement in political activities as queen was probably not of a significant nature but she is known to have signed royal charters and being active in patronage. "A beautiful and excellent lady, quiet and modest, her personality coinciding with her name," (Note: Translation of "Formosa e excellente senhora, tranquilla e modesta, condizente no carácter com o nome" (Dulce means "sweet") according to Lucian Cordeiro.) Dulce was used as a commodity to seal an alliance which aimed to "strengthen Portugal and to contain the expansionism of Castile and León" and she played the role that was expected of her as a wife and as the mother of numerous children.

== Death ==
Dulce did not live long after the birth of her last two daughters, Branca and Berengaria, probably twins, and died in 1198 probably succumbing to the plague and weakened by the successive childbirths. She was buried in the Monastery of Santa Cruz in Coimbra.

== Issue ==
Eleven children were born from her marriage to King Sancho, eight of whom reached adulthood:

- Theresa (1175/1176 – 18 June 1250), she became the wife of King Alfonso IX of León and was beatified in 1705;
- Sancha (1180 – 13 March 1229), founded the Monastery of Celas near Coimbra where she lived until her death. Her sister Theresa arranged for her burial at the Monastery of Lorvão. She was beatified by Pope Clement XI in 1705, the same year as Theresa;
- Constanza (May 1182 – 3 August 1202). She must have died before 1186 since her name is not registered in any of the documents of the chancellery of Sancho I which begins in that year"; (Note: However, the necrology of São Salvador de Moreira records the death “III Non Aug” in 1202 of “Domna Constantia Infantula filia regis domni Sancii et reginæ domnæ Dulciæ”.)
- Afonso (23 April 1186 – 25 March 1223), succeeded his father as the third king of Portugal;
- Raymond (1187/88 – 9 March bef. 1188/89), who died in infancy; (Note: The necrology of Santa Cruz de Coimbra records the death “VII Id Mar” of “dominus Raimundus filius domini regis Sancii et reginæ donnæ Dulciæ”; A. Brandaõ: Quarta Parte da Monarchia Lusitana, Lisbon 1632, Liber XII cap. XXI, p. 33. He was presumably not alive in Mar 1189, the date of his father's charter in which he is not named. It's probable that Raymond wasn't his parents´ oldest son as naming the first son after his maternal grandfather was unusual. If that is correct, the known dates of birth of his siblings indicate that Raimundo was born either in 1186 or after 1189.)
- Peter (23 February 1187 – 2 June 1258), spouse of Aurembiaix, Countess of Urgell;
- Ferdinand (24 March 1188 – 27 July 1233), spouse of Joan, Countess of Flanders;
- Henry (aft. March 1189 – 8 Dec aft. 1189), who died in infancy; (Note: The Nobiliario of Pedro Conde de Barcelos names "D. Alonso Sanchez, El Infante D. Pedro, El Infante D. Fernando Conde de Flandes, El Infante D. Enrique" as the sons of "D. Sancho Rey de Portugal" and his wife "D. Aldonça"; Pedro Barcelos, Tit. VII, Reyes de Portugal, 3 p. 30. He was presumably born after, or only shortly before, his father's charter dated March 1189. Sousa says that the necrology of Santa Cruz de Coimbra records the death 8 December of Infante dom Henrique, but he does not quote the wording in the source or provide a citation reference (A. C. de Sousa: Historia Genealogica da Casa Real Portugueza Lisbon 1735, vol. I, p. 87).)
- Mafalda (1195/1196 – 1 May 1256), the wife of Henry I of Castile, was beatified in 1793;
- Branca (1198 – 17 November 1240), probably the twin sister of Berengaria, was raised in the court with her father and his mistress "a Ribeirinha" and, when she was eight or ten years old, was sent to live with her sisters at the Monastery of Lorvão. She was a nun at a convent in Guadalajara and was buried at the same monastery as her mother;
- Berengaria (1198 – 27 March 1221), probably the twin sister of Branca, married Valdemar II of Denmark in 1214.

== Bibliography ==
- Mateu Ibars, Josefina; Mateu Ibars, María Dolores (1980). Colectánea paleográfica de la Corona de Aragón: Siglo IX-XVIII. Barcelona: Universitat Barcelona. ISBN 978-84-7528-694-5.
- Mattoso, José (2014). D. Afonso Henriques (in Portuguese). Lisbon: Temas e Debates. ISBN 978-972-759-911-0.
- Rodrigues Oliveira, Ana (2010). Rainhas medievais de Portugal. Dezassete mulheres, duas dinastias, quatro séculos de História (in Portuguese). Lisbon: A esfera dos livros. ISBN 978-989-626-261-7.
- Caetano de Souza, Antonio (1735). Historia Genealogica da Casa Real Portugueza (PDF) (in Portuguese). Vol. I. Lisbon: Lisboa Occidental, na oficina de Joseph Antonio da Sylva. ISBN 978-84-8109-908-9.

Portuguese royalty
Preceded by Maud of Savoy	Queen consort of Portugal; 1185–1198	Succeeded by Urraca of Castile
