= Urraca of Portugal =

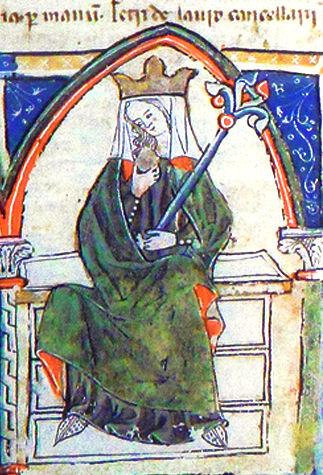

Queen consort of León
- Tenure: 1165 – 1175
- Born: 1148; Coimbra
- Died: c. 1211; Wamba, Valladolid
- Burial: Monastery of Santa María de Wamba
- Spouse: Ferdinand II of León (m. 1165; ann. 1175)
- Issue: Alfonso IX of León
- House: Portuguese House of Burgundy
- Father: Afonso I of Portugal
- Mother: Matilda of Savoy

Urraca of Portugal (Portuguese pronunciation: [uˈʁakɐ]; 1148 – 1211) was queen of León from 1165 until 1175 as the wife of King Ferdinand II. She was the daughter of the first Portuguese king, Afonso I, and the mother of Alfonso IX. After her marriage to Ferdinand was annulled, the former queen became a nun.

== Family ==
Urraca was born in Coimbra in 1148. She was the daughter of Afonso I, the first king of Portugal, and Matilda of Savoy. She had several siblings, including Sancho I. In May or June 1165, Urraca married Ferdinand II of León. The only son of this marriage, Alfonso IX, was born in Zamora on 15 August 1171. The marriage of Ferdinand II and Urraca was annulled in 1175 by Pope Alexander III because the two were second cousins, great-grandchildren of Alfonso VI of León and Castile.

== Monasticism ==
After the annulment of her marriage, Urraca became a nun, joining the Order of Saint John of Jerusalem. She retired to live in the estates that her former husband had given her in the Carta de Arras (wedding tokens) in Zamora. Later, she resided in the Monastery of Santa María de Wamba, which belonged to the aforementioned order.

On 25 May 1176, Queen Urraca donated land and villas to the Order of Saint John, probably coinciding with her joining the order. These properties included Castroverde de Campos and Mansilla in León, and Salas and San Andrés in Asturias. She was present in 1188 at the coronation of her son Alfonso IX, who succeeded his father Ferdinand II on 22 January 1188. On 4 May in that same year, she and her son confirmed the privileges granted by Ferdinand II to the Order of Santiago. Her presence is registered for the last time in medieval charters in 1211, when she donated the village of Castrotoraf, which she had received from Ferdinand in 1165 as a wedding gift, to the Cathedral of Zamora.

== Death ==
Queen Urraca died in Wamba, Valladolid, in 1211. She was buried at the Monastery of Santa María de Wamba in what is now the province of Valladolid. St Mary's, the former monastic church and the only part remaining of the ancient monastery, contains the Chapel of the Queen: a plaque that was placed there subsequently mentions that Queen Urraca had been interred in this church.

== Bibliography ==
- Arco y Garay, Ricardo del (1954). Sepulcros de la Casa Real de Castilla. Madrid: Instituto Jerónimo Zurita. Consejo Superior de Investigaciones Científicas. OCLC 11366237.
- Elorza, Juan C.; Vaquero, Lourdes; Castillo, Belén; Negro, Marta (1990). Junta de Castilla y León. Consejería de Cultura y Bienestar Social (ed.). El Panteón Real de las Huelgas de Burgos. Los enterramientos de los reyes de León y de Castilla. Publisher Evergráficas S.A. ISBN 84-241-9999-5.
- García Tato, Isidro (2004). Las encomiendas gallegas de la Orden Militar de San Juan de Jerusalén: Estudio y edición documental (in Spanish). Vol. I. Santiago de Compostela: Instituto de Estudios Gallegos "Padre Sarmiento. hdl:10261/49926. ISBN 840008250-8.
- Gross, Georg (1998). "El fuero de Castrotorafe (1129). Transición a la documentación romanizadora". Boletín de la Real Academia de la Historia (in Spanish). CXCV, Cuaderno II. Madrid: 221–229. ISSN 0034-0626.
- Mattoso, José (2014). D. Afonso Henriques (in Portuguese). Lisbon: Temas e Debates. ISBN 978-972-759-911-0.
- Rodrigues Oliveira, Ana (2010). Rainhas medievais de Portugal. Dezassete mulheres, duas dinastias, quatro séculos de História (in Portuguese). Lisbon: A esfera dos livros. ISBN 978-989-626-261-7.

Preceded by Richeza of Poland	Queen consort of León; 1165–1175	Succeeded by Teresa Fernández de Traba
