= Odo III of Burgundy =

Duke of Burgundy from 1192 to 1218

Odo III
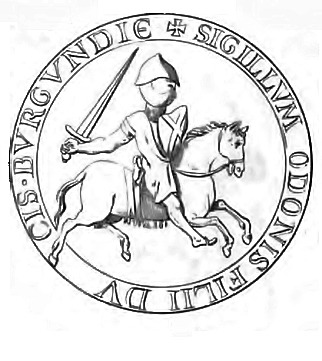
- Seal of Odo III

Duke of Burgundy
- Reign: 1192 – 1218
- Predecessor: Hugh III
- Successor: Hugh IV
- Born: 1166
- Died: 1218 (aged 51–52); Lyon
- Spouse: Theresa of Portugal; Alice of Vergy
- Issue Detail: Hugh IV, Duke of Burgundy
- House: House of Burgundy
- Father: Hugh III, Duke of Burgundy
- Mother: Alice of Lorraine

Odo III (French: Eudes; 1166 – 1218) was Duke of Burgundy between 1192 and 1218. Odo was the eldest son of Duke Hugh III and his first wife Alice, daughter of Duke Matthias I of Lorraine.

== Life ==
Odo did not follow his father's aggressive policies towards France and proved a worthy ally of King Philip II of France in his wars against King John of England and Emperor Otto IV. Of a phlegmatic temperament, he fought bravely against the latter in the Battle of Bouvines, where he lost, according to contemporary chroniclers, two horses beneath him.

Odo was also an important figure in the Albigensian Crusade against the Cathars. When Philip II refused to get involved, Odo stepped forward with the support of the local bishops and his vassals and organized the campaign of 1209 against the Cathar strongholds. Before leaving on crusade against the Cathars, Odo pledged the castle of Ile-d'Ouche and the village of Crimolois to the Knights Templar to assist them in the defense of the Catholic faith.

== Marriages and issue ==
In 1194, Odo married Theresa of Portugal (1156–1218), the daughter of Afonso I of Portugal and Matilda of Savoy. She was repudiated in 1195, having produced no children.

In 1199, Odo married Alice of Vergy (1182–1252), the daughter of Hugh, Seigneur de Vergy, by Gillette de Trainel. This marriage produced:

- Joan (1200–1223), married Raoul II of Lusignan (died 1250), Seigneur d'Issoudun and Count of Eu.
- Alice (1204–1266) married Robert I (died 1262) Count of Clermont and Dauphin of Auvergne
- Hugh IV (1213–1272), his successor in the duchy
- Beatrice (born 1216), married Humbert III of Thoire (died 1279)

== Sources ==
- Adamo, Phillip C. (2014). New Monks in Old Habits: The Formation of the Caulite Monastic Order, 1193-1267. Pontifical Institute of Mediaeval Studies.
- Barber, Malcolm (2000). The Cathars: Dualist Heretics in Languedoc in the High Middle Ages. Pearson Education Limited.
- Bouchard, Constance Brittain (1988). Sword, Miter, and Cloister: Nobility and the Church in Burgundy, 980-1198. Cornell University Press.
- Duby, Georges (1990). The Legend of Bouvines: War, Religion and Culture in the Middle Ages. Translated by Tihanyi, Catherine. University of California Press.
- Schenk, Jochen (2012). Templar Families: Landowning Families and the Order of the Temple in France, c. 1120-1307. Cambridge University Press.

== See also ==
- Dukes of Burgundy family tree

Odo III of Burgundy House of Burgundy Cadet branch of the Capetian dynasty Born: 1166 Died: 6 July 1218
Preceded by Hugh III	Duke of Burgundy; 1192–1218	Succeeded by Hugh IV
