= Matilda of Savoy, Queen of Portugal =

Queen of Portugal from 1146 to 1157

Matilda of Savoy
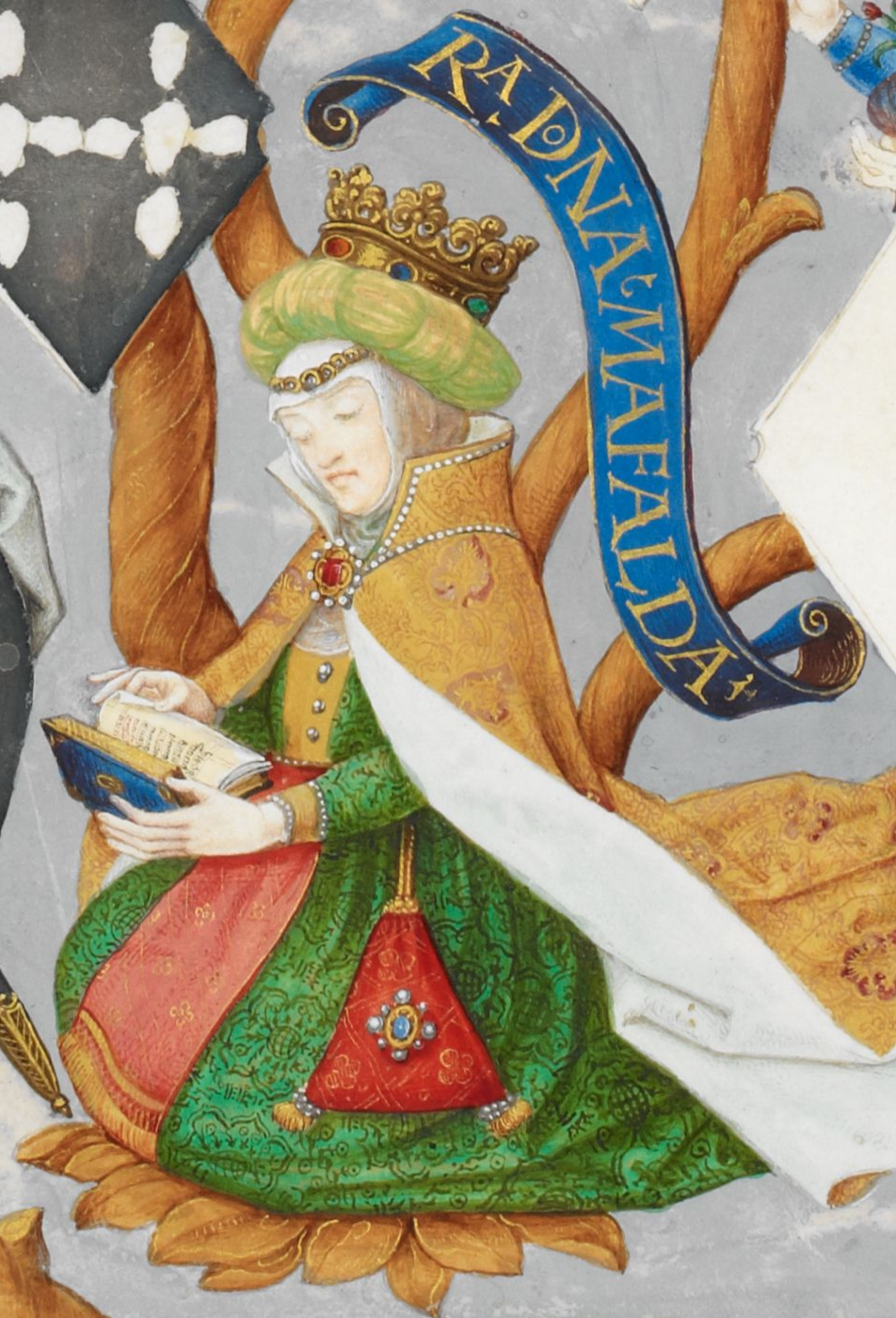

Queen consort of Portugal
- Tenure: 1146–1157/1158
- Born: c. 1125; County of Savoy
- Died: 3 December 1157 (aged 31–32); Coimbra, Kingdom of Portugal
- Burial: Santa Cruz Monastery, Coimbra, District of Coimbra, Portugal
- Spouse: Afonso I of Portugal
- Issue Among others...: Urraca, Queen of León; Theresa, Countess of Flanders; Infanta Mafalda; Sancho I, King of Portugal
- House: House of Savoy
- Father: Amadeus III, Count of Savoy
- Mother: Mahaut of Albon

Matilda of Savoy (French: Mathilde or Maud, Portuguese: Mafalda or Matilde; c. 1125– 3 December 1157/58) was Queen of Portugal, after her marriage to King Afonso Henriques, the first sovereign of Portugal, whom she married in 1146.

== Origins ==
Matilda was the second or third daughter of Amadeus III, Count of Savoy and Maurienne, and Mahaut of Albon (the sister of Guigues IV of Albon, "le Dauphin"). One of her aunts, Adelaide of Maurienne, was queen consort as the wife of King Louis VI of France, and one of her granduncles was Pope Callixtus II whose papacy lasted from 1119 until 1124, the year of his death.

== Possible reasons for her marriage ==
Her father had joined the Second Crusade and this could have been one of the reasons why she was chosen as the consort of Portugal's first monarch. Such an alliance would contribute to expelling the Moors from Portuguese territory and would also show the new King's independence by selecting a wife outside the sphere of influence of the Kingdom of León. It is also possible that he was not able to select one of the infantas from the neighboring Iberian kingdoms due to reasons of consanguinity. The wedding could have also been suggested by Guido de Vico, the papal representative in the Iberian Peninsula who had been one of the witnesses of the Treaty of Zamora in 1143.

== Life as queen consort ==
Matilda first appears with her husband on 23 May 1146 confirming a donation that had been made previously by her mother-in-law, Teresa of León, to the Order of Cluny. She was very devoted to the Cistercian Order and founded the Monasterio of Costa in Guimarães and a hospital/hostel for pilgrims, the poor and the sick in Canaveses. She stipulated in her will that this hospital was to be kept always clean, that it should be furnished with good and clean beds and that, if any of those lodged at the institution should die there, three masses were to be celebrated for the salvation of their souls.

Walter Map, in his work, De nugis curialium, tells a story that "the King of Portugal now living", almost certainly Afonso, had been convinced by evil counselors to murder his pregnant wife out of misplaced jealousy. However, there is no other authority for this account, and it is not generally accepted.

== Death and burial ==
Queen Matilda died in Coimbra on 3 December 1157 or 1158 (Note: Mattoso refers to 1157 as the year of her death. Portuguese historian La Figanière mentions the same day but a year later based on a document which proves that the queen was still alive in 1158. The document, dated 1158 and kept at the Torre do Tombo, mentioned by La Figanière refers to the donation of Atouguia by King Afonso and his wife to Guilherme de cornibus where Afonso confirms cum uxore mea Regina domna Mahalda filia comitis Amadei (sic) et de Moriana ("with my wife Queen Mafalda, daughter of the Count of Savoy and Maurienne") .) and was buried at the Monastery of Santa Cruz where her husband, who survived her by more than twenty-seven years, was later interred. She was survived by six of her seven children, only three of whom, infantes Sancho, Urraca and Theresa, would reach adulthood.

== Marriage and issue ==
Although the Annales D. Alfonsi Portugallensium Regis, record that the wedding of Alfonso and Matilda was celebrated in 1145, it was not until a year later, in May 1146, when they both appear in royal charters. Historian José Mattoso refers to another source, Noticia sobre a Conquista de Santarém (News on the Conquest of Santarém), which states that the city was taken on 15 May 1147, less than a year after their marriage. Since at that time no wedding ceremony could be performed during Lent, Mattoso suggests that the marriage could have taken place in March or April of 1146, possibly on Easter Sunday which fell on 31 March of that year. The groom was almost thirty-eight years old and the bride was about twenty-one years old. The children of this marriage were:

- Henry (5 March 1147– June 1155), named after his paternal grandfather, Henry, he died when he was only eight years old. Despite being just a child he represented his father at a council in Toledo at the age of three. He died in 1155, shortly after the birth of his brother Sancho.
- Urraca (1148– 1211), married King Ferdinand II of León and was the mother of King Alfonso IX. The marriage was subsequently annulled in 1171 or 1172 and she retired in Zamora, one of the villas that she had received as part of her arras, and later at the Monastery of Santa María in Wamba, Valladolid where she was buried.;
- Theresa (1151– 1218), Countess consort of Flanders due to her marriage to Philip I and Duchess consort of Burgundy through her second marriage to Odo III;
- Mafalda (1153– after 1162). In January 1160, her father and Ramón Berenguer IV, Count of Barcelona, negotiated the marriage of Mafalda to Alfonso, future King Alfonso II of Aragon who at that time was three or four years old. After the death of Ramón Berenguer IV in the summer of 1162, King Ferdinand II of León convinced his widow, Queen Petronilla, to cancel the infante's wedding plans with Mafalda and for Alfonso to marry instead Sancha, daughter of Alfonso VII of León and his second wife Queen Richeza of Poland. Mafalda died in her childhood at an unrecorded date.
- Sancho, the future King Sancho I of Portugal (11 November 1154– 26 March 1211). He was baptised with the name of Martin for having been born on the saint's feast day.;
- John (1156 – 25 August 1164); and
- Sancha (1157 – 14 February 1166/67), born ten days before the death of her mother, Sancha died before reaching the age of ten. on 14 February according to the death registry at the Monastery of Santa Cruz (Coimbra) where she was buried.

== Bibliography ==
- Arco y Garay, Ricardo del (1954). Sepulcros de la Casa Real de Castilla. Madrid: Instituto Jerónimo Zurita. Consejo Superior de Investigaciones Científicas. OCLC 11366237.
- Caetano de Souza, Antonio (1735). Historia Genealógica de la Real Casa Portuguesa (PDF) (in Portuguese). Vol. I. Lisbon: Lisboa Occidental, na oficina de Joseph Antonio da Sylva. ISBN 978-84-8109-908-9.
- La Figanière, Frederico Francisco de (1859). Memorias da rainhas de Portugal (in Portuguese). Lisbon: Typographia Universal. OCLC 680459800.
- Mattoso, José (2014). D. Afonso Henriques (in Portuguese). Lisbon: Temas e Debates. ISBN 978-972-759-911-0.
- Previte-Orton, C.W. (1912). The Early History of the House of Savoy: 1000-1233. Cambridge University Press.
- Rodrigues Oliveira, Ana (2010). Rainhas medievais de Portugal. Dezassete mulheres, duas dinastias, quatro séculos de História (in Portuguese). Lisbon: A esfera dos livros. ISBN 978-989-626-261-7.

Royal titles
Preceded by None	Queen consort of Portugal; 1146–1157/58	Succeeded by Dulce of Aragon
