= Castrodeza =

Coordinates: 41°39′N 4°57′W

Castrodeza, Spain
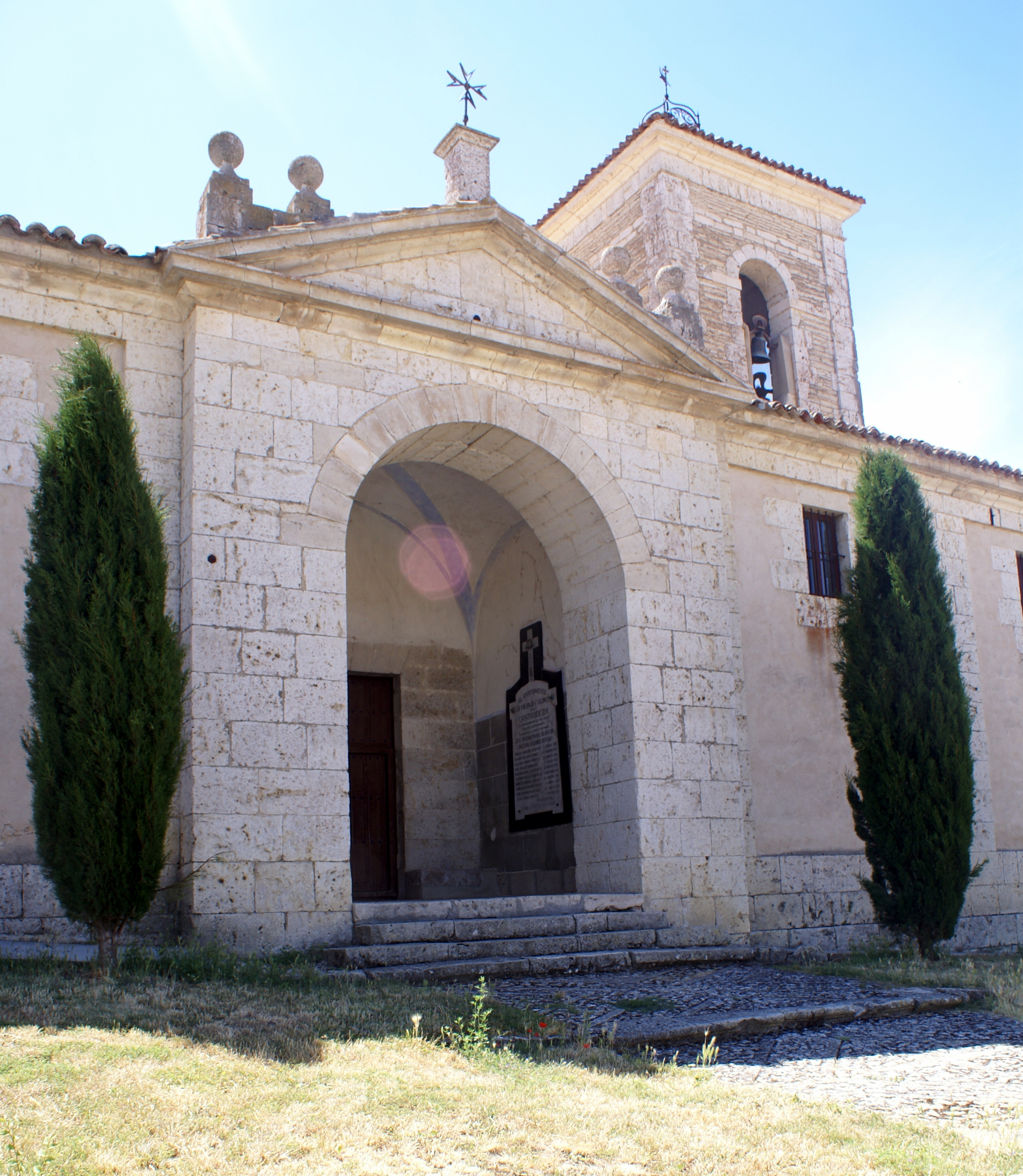
- church of castrodeza
- Country: Spain
- Autonomous community: Castile and León
- Province: Valladolid
- Municipality: Castrodeza

Area
  - Total: 15 km^{2} (5.8 sq mi)

Population (2025-01-01)
  - Total: 148
  - Density: 9.9/km^{2} (26/sq mi)
- Time zone: UTC+1 (CET)
  - Summer (DST): UTC+2 (CEST)

Castrodeza is a municipality located in the province of Valladolid, Castile and León, Spain. According to the 2004 census (INE), the municipality has a population of 228 inhabitants.
