= Ciguñuela =

Coordinates: 41°38′N 4°51′W

Ciguñuela, Spain
- Coat of arms

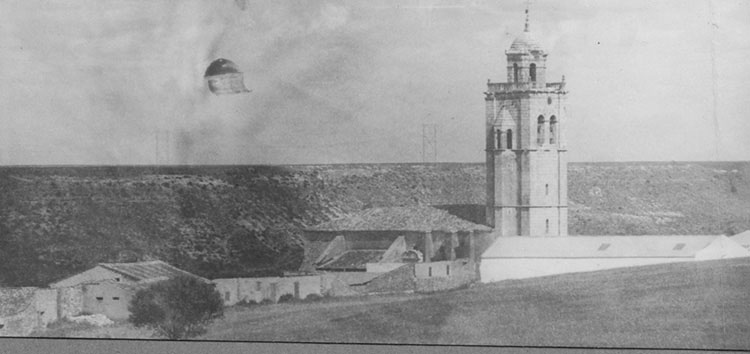
- panoramic view
- Country: Spain
- Autonomous community: Castile and León
- Province: Valladolid
- Municipality: Ciguñuela

Area
  - Total: 30 km^{2} (12 sq mi)

Population (2025-01-01)
  - Total: 361
  - Density: 12/km^{2} (31/sq mi)
- Time zone: UTC+1 (CET)
  - Summer (DST): UTC+2 (CEST)

Ciguñuela is a municipality located in the province of Valladolid, Castile and León, Spain. According to the 2010 census (INE), the municipality has a population of 396 inhabitants.

== See also ==
- Cuisine of the province of Valladolid
