= Afonso I of Portugal =

King of Portugal from 1139 to 1185

Afonso I
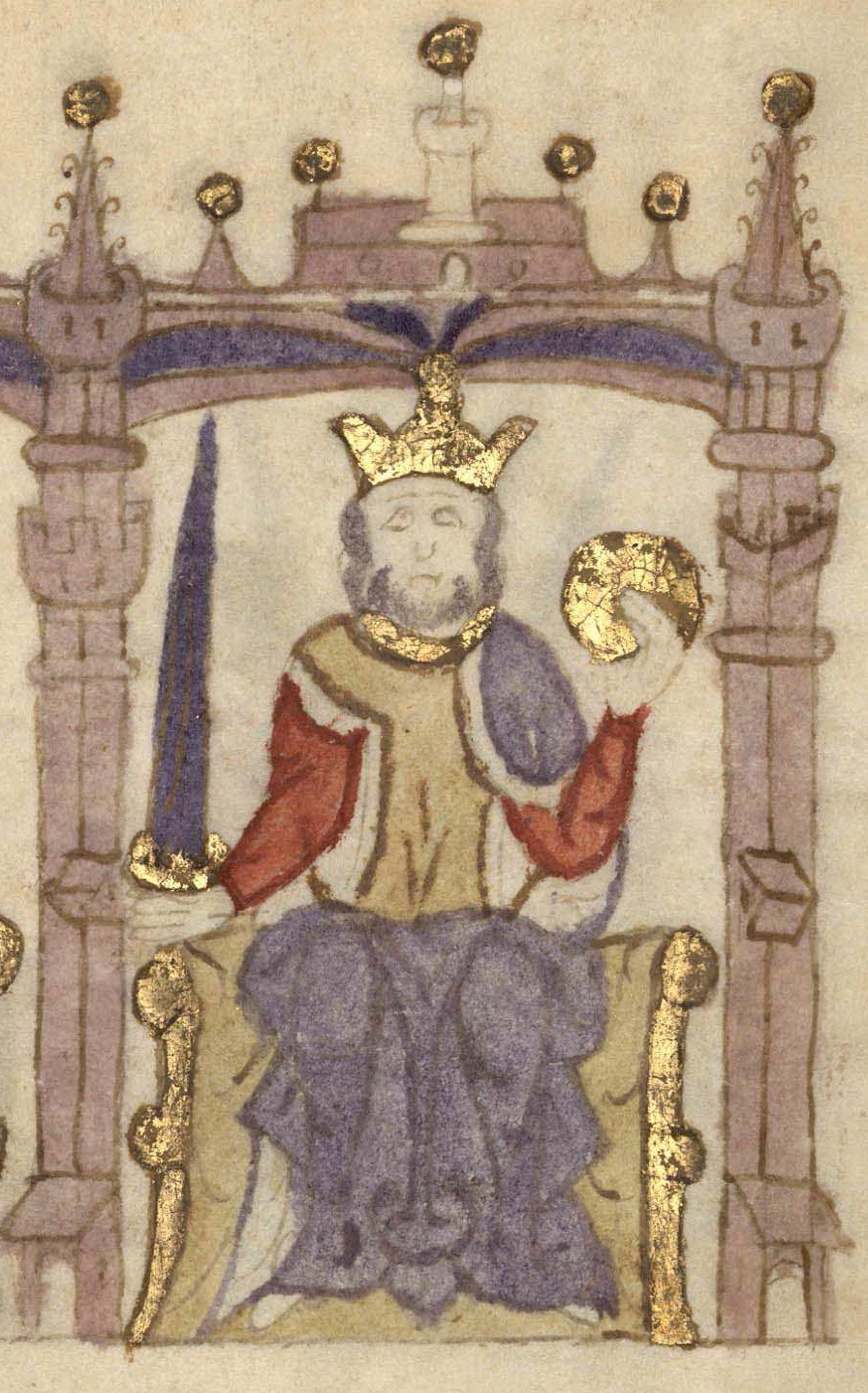
- Depiction in the Castilian manuscript Compendium of Chronicles of Kings, c. 1312–1325

King of the Portuguese
- Reign: 26 July 1139 – 6 December 1185
- Acclamation: 25 July 1139
- Successor: Sancho I

Count of Portugal
- Reign: 22 May 1112 – 25 July 1139
- Predecessor: Henry
- Co-ruler: Theresa (1112–1128)
- Born: Afonso Henriques; 1106, 25 July 1109, August 1109 or 1111; Guimarães (some argue Viseu)
- Died: 6 December 1185 (aged c. 73–79); Coimbra, Portugal
- Burial: Santa Cruz Monastery, Coimbra
- Spouse: Matilda of Savoy (m. 1146; died 1157)
- Issue among others...: Urraca, Queen of León; Teresa, Countess of Flanders; Mafalda; Sancho I, King of Portugal (ill.) Fernando Afonso
- House: Burgundy
- Father: Henry, Count of Portugal
- Mother: Theresa, Countess of Portugal

Dom Afonso I (Note: Portuguese pronunciation: [ɐˈfõsu]) (Note: Or also Affonso (Archaic Portuguese-Galician) or Alphonso (Portuguese-Galician) or Alphonsus (Latin version), sometimes rendered in English as Alphonzo or Alphonse, depending on the Spanish or French influence.) (born Afonso Henriques; 1106/1109/1111 – 6 December 1185) nicknamed "the Conqueror" (Portuguese: O Conquistador), "the Founder" (O Fundador) and "the Great" (O Magno) by the Portuguese, was the first king of Portugal, from 26 July 1139 until his death on 6 December 1185. He achieved the independence of the County of Portugal, establishing a new kingdom and doubling its area with the Reconquista, an objective that he pursued until his death.

Afonso was the son of Theresa of León and Henry of Burgundy, rulers of the County of Portugal. Henry died in 1112, leaving Theresa to rule alone. Unhappy with Theresa's romantic relationship with Galician Fernando Pérez de Traba and his political influence, the Portuguese nobility rallied around Afonso, who revolted and defeated his mother at the Battle of São Mamede in 1128 and became sole Count of Portugal soon afterwards. In 1139, Afonso renounced the suzerainty of the Kingdom of León and established the independent Kingdom of Portugal.

Afonso actively campaigned against the Moors in the south. In 1139 he won a decisive victory at the Battle of Ourique, and in 1147 he seized Santarém and Lisbon from the Moors, with help from men on their way to the Holy Land for the Second Crusade. He secured the independence of Portugal following a victory over León at Valdevez and received papal approval through Manifestis Probatum. Afonso died in 1185 and was succeeded by his son, Sancho I.

== Early life ==
Afonso was the son of Theresa, the illegitimate daughter of King Alfonso VI of León, and her husband, Henry of Burgundy. He was the youngest of 3 children, with the oldest being Urraca Henriques and Sancha Henriques being the middle child. Historians have also come to a consesus that a fourth illegitimate child was born from Henry of Burgundy, namely Pedro Afonso, who followed on his half-brother's conquests and later settled as a monk in Alcobaça Monastery.

His place of birth has been highly disputed between scholars and historians, with four distinct possibilities: 1) he was born in Guimarães, which was an important fortified position in the County of Portugal; 2) he was born in Viseu, which was an important economic hub for the County; 3) he was born in Coimbra, an immensely important city where he would later spent the most time in and be buried in; or 4) he was born elsewhere, either Tierra de Campos, Sahagún or Braga.

According to the Crónica de Portugal de 1419 the future Portuguese king was born in Viseu, which was at the time the most important political centre of his parents. This was accepted by most Portuguese scholars until 1990, when Torquato de Sousa Soares proposed Coimbra, the centre of the county of Coimbra and another political centre of Afonso's progenitors, as his birthplace, which caused outrage in Guimarães and a polemic between this historian and José Hermano Saraiva. Almeida Fernandes later proposed Viseu as the birthplace of Afonso based on the Chronica Gothorum, which states Afonso was born in 1109, a position followed by historian José Mattoso in his biography of the king, regardless of this, it is still widely accepted in popular conscience that Afonso was born in Guimarães. Abel Estefânio has suggested a different date and thesis, proposing 1106 as the birth date and the region of Tierra de Campos or even Sahagún as likely birthplaces based on the known itineraries of Henry and Theresa.

His place of baptism is also under suspicion: according to tradition the place is indicated as being in the Church of São Miguel do Castelo, in Guimarães, however, recent scholarship, backed by architectural and archeological evidence, have cast doubts on this claim. It has been calculated that the date of the consecration of the Church took place in 1239, therefore putting the construction of the church an entire century after his birth. There are those who argue that the baptism actually took place in the Cathedral of Braga where he was baptised by the Primate Archbishop Saint Gerald of Braga, which was a politically sound move for Count Henry to have the highest-ranking clergy in his fiefdom baptise his heir.

Henry and Theresa reigned jointly as count and countess of Portugal until his death on 22 May 1112 during the siege of Astorga, after which Theresa ruled Portugal as a widow. Both women, Countess Theresa and Queen Urraca, ruled alone after the deaths of their immigrant husbands, ostensibly in defence of their young children, but also in their own right. Theresa would proclaim herself queen (a claim recognised by Pope Paschal II in 1116) but was captured and forced to reaffirm her vassalage to her half-sister, Urraca of León.

It is not known who was the tutor of Afonso. Later traditions, probably started with João Soares Coelho (a bastard descendant of Egas Moniz through a female line) in the mid-13th century and ampliated by later chronicles such as the Crónica de Portugal de 1419, asserted he had been Egas Moniz de Ribadouro, possibly with the help of oral memories that associated the tutor to the house of Ribadouro. Yet, contemporary documents, namely from the chancery of Afonso in his early years as count of Portucale, indicate according to Mattoso that the most likely tutor of Afonso Henriques was Egas Moniz's oldest brother, Ermígio Moniz, who, besides being the senior brother within the family of Ribadouro, became the "dapifer" and "majordomus" of Afonso I from 1128 until his death in 1135, which indicates his closer proximity to the prince.

In an effort to pursue a larger share in the Leonese inheritance, his mother Theresa joined forces with Fernando Pérez de Trava, the most powerful count in Galicia. The Portuguese nobility disliked the alliance between Galicia and Portugal and rallied around Afonso. The Archbishop of Braga, Maurice Bourdin, was also concerned with the dominance of Galicia, apprehensive of the ecclesiastical pretensions of his new rival the Galician Archbishop of Santiago de Compostela, Diego Gelmírez, who had claimed an alleged discovery of relics of Saint James in his town, as a way to gain power and riches over the other cathedrals in the Iberian Peninsula. In order to stop her son Afonso from overthrowing her, Theresa exiled him when he was twelve in the year 1120. In 1122, Afonso turned fourteen, the adult age in the 12th century. In symmetry with his cousin Afonso VII, Afonso Henriques made himself a knight on his own account in the Cathedral of Zamora in 1125. After the military campaign of Alfonso VII against his mother in 1127, Afonso revolted against his own and proceeded to take control of the county from its ruler.

== Path to sole rulership ==
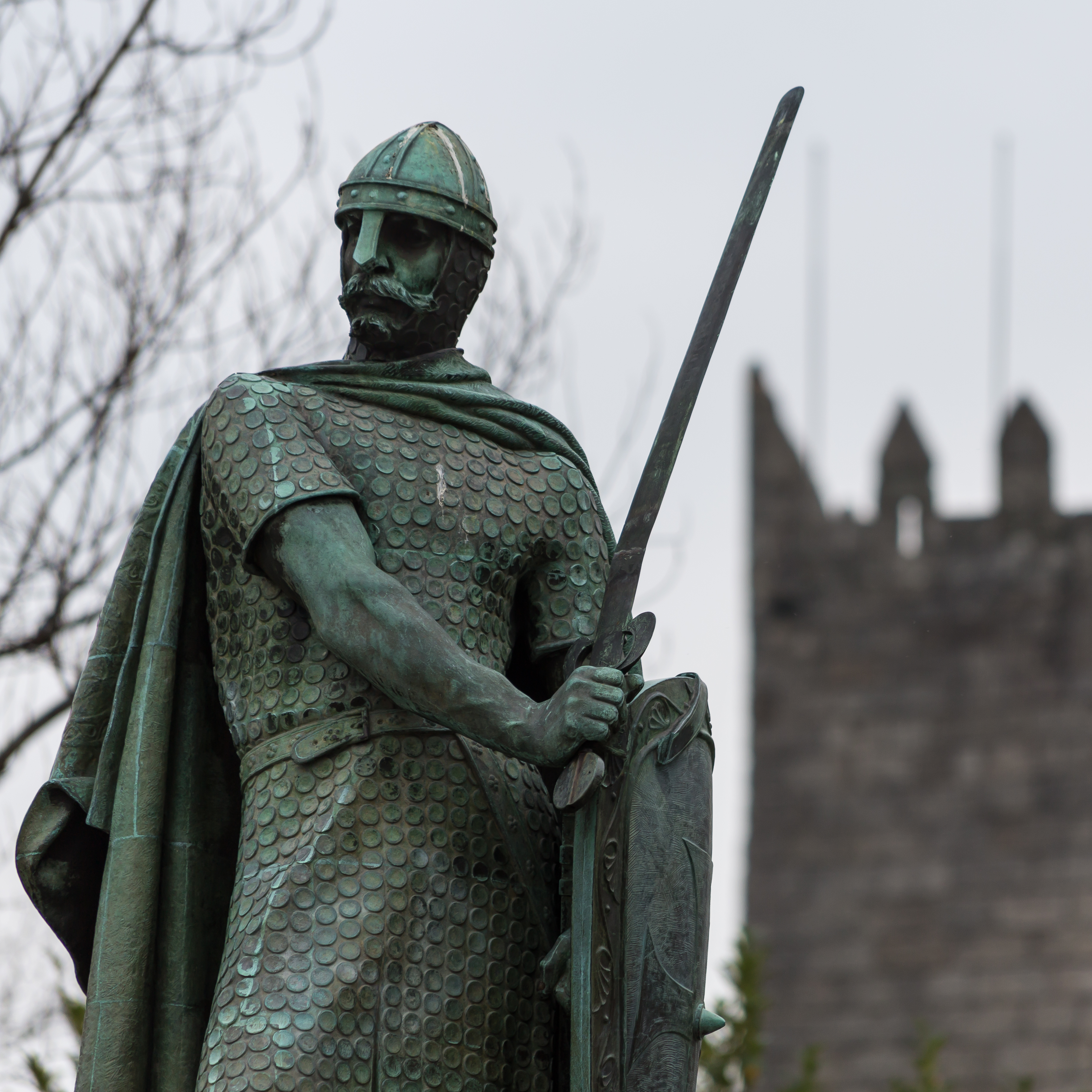
Statue of Afonso Henriques in Guimarães, Portugal

In 1128, near Guimarães at the Battle of São Mamede, Afonso and his supporters overcame troops under both his mother and her lover, Count Fernando Pérez de Traba of Galicia. Afonso exiled his mother to Galicia, and took over rule of the County of Portucale. Thus the possibility of re-incorporating Portucale into a Kingdom of Portugal and Galicia as before was eliminated and Afonso became sole ruler following demands for greater independence from the county's church and nobles. The battle was mostly ignored by the Leonese suzerain, who was occupied at the time with a revolt in Castile. He was also, most likely, waiting for the reaction of the Galician families. After Theresa's death in 1131, Alfonso VII of León proceeded to demand vassalage from his cousin. On 6 April 1129, Afonso Henriques dictated the writ in which he proclaimed himself Prince of Portugal or Prince of the Portuguese, an act informally allowed by Alfonso VII, as it was thought to be Afonso Henriques's right by blood, as one of two grandsons of the Emperor of Hispania.

Afonso then turned his arms against the persistent problem of the Moors in the south. His campaigns were successful and, on 25 July 1139, he obtained an overwhelming victory in the Battle of Ourique, and straight after was (possibly unanimously) proclaimed King of the Portuguese by his soldiers, establishing his equality in rank to the other realms of the Peninsula, although the first reference to his royal title dates from 1140.

The first assembly of the Portuguese Cortes supposedly convened at Lamego, wherein Afonso would have been given the crown from the Archbishop of Braga. However, this Cortes of Lamego is a 17th-century embellishment of Portuguese history in a time where the legitimacy of the Cortes to elevate a king and/or appoint a regent was necessary.

== Reign ==
Complete independence from Alfonso VII of León's suzerainty, however, could not be achieved by military means alone. The County of Portugal still had to be acknowledged diplomatically by the neighboring lands as a kingdom and, most importantly, by the Catholic Church and the pope. Afonso wed Matilda of Savoy, daughter of Count Amadeus III of Savoy, and sent ambassadors to Rome to negotiate with the pope. He succeeded in renouncing the suzerainty of his cousin, Alfonso VII of León, becoming instead a vassal of the papacy, as the kings of Sicily and Aragon had done before him.

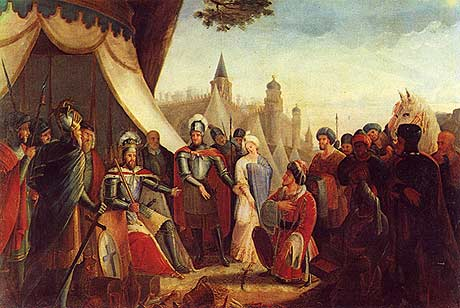
King Afonso I at the Siege of Lisbon (oil on canvas by Joaquim Rodrigues Braga)

In Portugal he built several monasteries and convents and bestowed important privileges to religious orders. He is notably the builder of Alcobaça Monastery, to which he called the Cistercian Order of his uncle Bernard of Clairvaux of Burgundy. In 1143, he wrote to Pope Innocent II to declare himself and the kingdom servants of the church, swearing to pursue driving the Moors out of the Iberian Peninsula. Bypassing any king of León, Afonso declared himself the direct liege man of the papacy. Afonso continued to distinguish himself by his exploits against the Moors, from whom he wrested Santarém (see Conquest of Santarém) and Lisbon in 1147 (see Siege of Lisbon). He also conquered an important part of the land south of the Tagus River, although this was lost again to the Moors in the following years.

Meanwhile, King Alfonso VII of León regarded the independent ruler of Portugal as nothing but a rebel. Conflict between the two was constant and bitter in the following years. Afonso became involved in a war, taking the side of the Aragonese king, an enemy of Castile. To ensure the alliance, his son Sancho was engaged to Dulce of Aragon. Finally after winning the Battle of Valdevez, the Treaty of Zamora (1143) established peace between the cousins and the recognition by the Kingdom of León that Portugal was a fully independent kingdom.

In 1169 the now old King Afonso was possibly disabled in an engagement near Badajoz, by a fall from his horse and slamming against the castle gate, and made prisoner by the soldiers of King Ferdinand II of León, his son-in-law. He spent months at the hot springs of São Pedro do Sul, but never recovered and from this time onward the Portuguese king never rode a horse again. However, it is not certain if this was because of the disability: according to the later Portuguese chronistic tradition, this happened because Afonso would have to surrender himself again to Ferdinand or risk war between the two kingdoms if he ever rode a horse again. Portugal was obliged to surrender as his ransom almost all the conquests Afonso had made in Galicia (north of the Minho River) in the previous years. This event became known in Portuguese history as the Disaster of Badajoz (o Desastre de Badajoz).

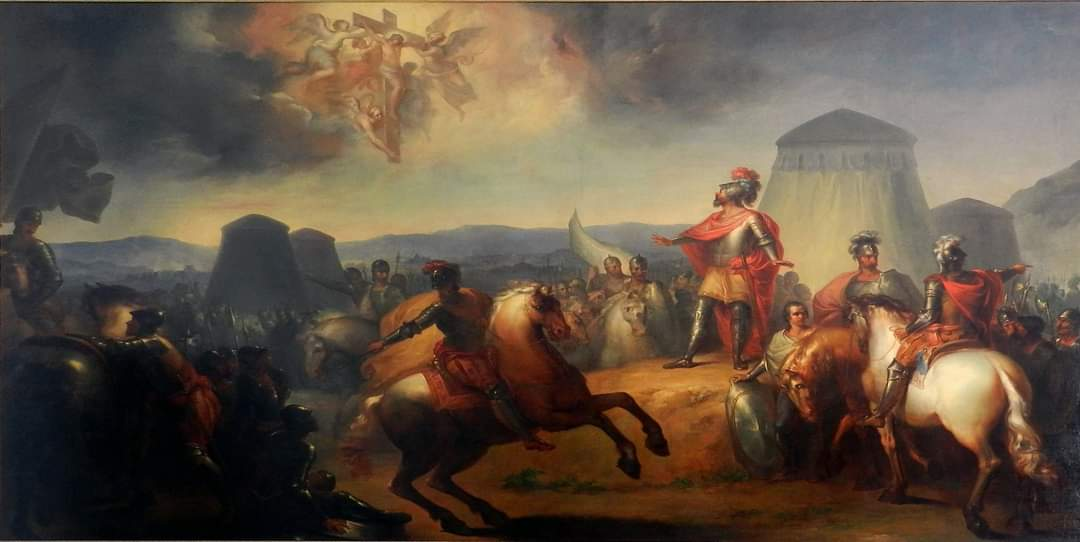
Afonso at the Battle of Ourique witnessing the Miracle of the Cross (dated 1793 by Domigos Sequeira)

In 1179 the privileges and favors given to the Catholic Church were compensated. With consistent effort by several parties, such as the primate archbishop of Braga, Paio Mendes, in the papal court, the papal bull Manifestis Probatum was promulgated accepting the new king as vassal to the pope exclusively. In it Pope Alexander III also acknowledged Afonso as king and Portugal as an independent kingdom with the right to conquer lands from the Moors.

In 1184, the Almohad caliph Abu Yaqub Yusuf rallied a great Almohad force to retaliate against the Portuguese raids done since the end of a five-year truce in 1178 and besieged Santarém, which was defended by Afonso's son Sancho. The Almohad siege failed when news arrived the archbishop of Compostella had come to the defense of the city and Fernando II of León himself with his army. The Almohads ended the siege and their retreat turned into a rout due to panic in their camp, with the Almohad caliph being injured in the process (according to one version, because of a crossbow bolt) and dying on the way back to Seville. Afonso died shortly after on 6 December 1185. The Portuguese revere him as a hero, both on account of his personal character and as the founder of their nation.

There are mythical stories that it took ten men to carry his sword and that Afonso wanted to engage other monarchs in personal combat, but no one would dare accept his challenge. It is also told, despite his honourable character, that he had a temper. Several chronicles give the example of a papal legate that brought a message from Pope Paschal II refusing to acknowledge Afonso's claim as king: either after the papal legate committed or said a small offense against him or, perhaps, after being simply read the letter, Afonso almost killed, in his rage, the papal representative, and it took several Portuguese nobles and soldiers to physically restrain the young would-be king.

== Scientific research ==
Tomb of Afonso Henriques in the Santa Cruz Monastery in Coimbra

In July 2006, the tomb of the king (which is located in the Santa Cruz Monastery in Coimbra) was to be opened for scientific purposes by researchers from the University of Coimbra (Portugal) and the University of Granada (Spain). The opening of the tomb provoked considerable concern among some sectors of Portuguese society and Portuguese State Agency for Architectural Patrimony (Instituto Português do Património Arquitectónico – IPPAR) halted the opening, requesting more protocols from the scientific team because of the importance of the king in the nation's heart and public thought.

== Family ==
In 1146, (Note: Although the Annales D. Alfonsi Portugallensium Regis, record that the wedding of Alfonso and Matilda was celebrated in 1145, it was not until a year later, in May 1146, when they both appear in royal charters. Historian José Mattoso refers to another source, Noticia sobre a Conquista de Santarém (News on the Conquest of Santarém), which states that the city was taken on 15 May 1147, less than a year after their marriage. Since at that time no wedding ceremony could be performed during Lent, Mattoso suggests that the marriage could have taken place in March or April 1146, possibly on Easter Sunday which fell on 31 March of that year.) Afonso married Matilda, daughter of Amadeus III, Count of Savoy and Mahaut of Albon, both appearing together for the first time in May of that year confirming royal charters. They had the following issue:

- Henry (5 March 1147 – 1155) named after his paternal grandfather, Henry, Count of Portugal, he died when he was only eight years old. Despite being just a child he represented his father at a council in Toledo at the age of three;
- Urraca (1148–1211), married King Ferdinand II of León and was the mother of King Alfonso IX. The marriage was subsequently annulled in 1171 or 1172 and she retired in Zamora, one of the villas that she had received as part of her arras, and later at the Monastery of Santa María in Wamba, Valladolid where she was buried;
- Teresa (1151–1218), countess consort of Flanders due to her marriage to Philip I and duchess consort of Burgundy through her second marriage to Odo III;
- Mafalda (1153 – after 1162). In January 1160, her father and Ramón Berenguer IV, Count of Barcelona, negotiated the marriage of Mafalda to Alfonso, future King Alfonso II of Aragon who at that time was three or four years old. After the death of Ramón Berenguer IV in the summer of 1162, King Ferdinand II of León convinced his widow, Queen Petronilla, to cancel the infante's wedding plans with Mafalda and for Alfonso to marry instead Sancha, daughter of Alfonso VII of León and his second wife Queen Richeza of Poland. Mafalda died in her childhood at an unrecorded date.
- Sancho, the future King of Portugal (11 November 1154 – 26 March 1211). He was baptised with the name of Martin for having been born on the saint's feast day;
- John (1156–25 August 1164); and
- Sancha (1157–14 February 1166/67), born ten days before the death of her mother, Sancha died before reaching the age of ten on 14 February according to the death registry at the Monastery of Santa Cruz (Coimbra) where she was buried.

Before his marriage to Matilda, King Afonso fathered his first son with Chamoa Gómez, daughter of Count Gómez Núñez and Elvira Pérez, sister of Fernando and Bermudo Pérez de Traba:

- Afonso (1140–1207). Born around 1140, according to recent investigations, he is the same person as the one often called Fernando Afonso who was the alferes-mor of the king and later Grand Master of the Knights Hospitaller. His presence in the court is first recorded in 1159. In 1169 he succeeded as alferes-mor his half-brother, Pedro Pais da Maia, the legitimate son of his mother and Paio Soares da Maia.

The extramarital offspring by Elvira Gálter were:

- Urraca Afonso. In 1185, her father gave her Avô, stipulating that this villa was to be inherited only by the children that she had with her husband Pedro Afonso de Ribadouro (also known as Pedro Afonso Viegas), grandson of Egas Moniz, which could indicate another previous or subsequent marriage. In 1187, she exchanged with her half-brother, King Sancho, this villa for Aveiro. She died after 1216, the year she made a donation to the Monastery of Tarouca.
- Teresa Afonso. In some genealogies she appears as the daughter of Elvira Gálter, and in others as the daughter of Chamoa Gómez. Her first marriage was with Sancho Nunes de Barbosa with whom she had a daughter, Urraca Sanches, who married Gonçalo Mendes de Sousa, the father of Mendo Gonçalves de Sousa known as "Sousão". Her second husband was Fernando Martins Bravo, Lord of Bragança and Chaves, with no issue from this marriage.

King Afonso was also the father of:

- Pedro Afonso (died after 1183), Lord of Arega and Pedrógão, mayor of Abrantes in 1179, alferes of King Afonso I between 1181 and 1183, and Master of the Order of Aviz.

== See also ==
- Gallaecia
- History of Portugal
- Timeline of Portuguese history
- List of Knights Templar
- Portugal in the Middle Ages
  - Portugal in the Reconquista
- Afonso Henriques Theatre
- Avenida Dom Afonso Henriques
- Vitória S.C.
  - Afonso Henriques Stadium

== Bibliography ==
- Arco y Garay, Ricardo del (1954). Sepulcros de la Casa Real de Castilla (in Spanish). Madrid: Instituto Jerónimo Zurita. Consejo Superior de Investigaciones Científicas. OCLC 11366237.
- Baquero Moreno, Humberto (2006). "Portugal e o reino das Astúrias no período de formação". Astúrias e Portugal. Relações históricas e culturais. Actas do Colóquio 5 a 7 de Dezembro de 2005 (in Portuguese). Lisbon: Academia Portuguesa da História. pp. 115–141. ISBN 972-624-164-2.
- Calderón Medina, Inés (2008). "La nobleza portuguesa al servicio del rey de León 1157–1187. Pero Pais de Maia y Vasco Fernandes de Soverosa". Actas IV Simposio Internacional de Jóvenes Medievalistas, Lorca 2008 (PDF) (in Spanish). Universidad de Murcia, Sociedad Española de Estudios Medievales, Ayuntamiento de Lorca, et al. pp. 39–50. ISBN 978-84-8371-801-8. Archived (PDF) from the original on 9 October 2022.
- Freitas do Amaral, Diogo (2000). D. Afonso Henriques (in Portuguese). Lisbon: Bertrand. ISBN 972-25-1157-2.
- Mattoso, José (2014) [2007]. D. Afonso Henriques (in Portuguese). Lisbon: Temas e Debates. ISBN 978-972-759-911-0.
- Previte-Orton, C.W. (1912). The Early History of the House of Savoy: 1000–1233. Cambridge University Press.
- Rodrigues Oliveira, Ana (2010). Rainhas medievais de Portugal. Dezassete mulheres, duas dinastias, quatro séculos de História (in Portuguese). Lisbon: A esfera dos livros. ISBN 978-989-626-261-7.
- Sánchez Candeira, Alfonso (1999). Rosa Montero Tejada (ed.). Castilla y León en el siglo XI, estudio del reinado de Fernando I (in Spanish). Madrid: Real Academia de la Historia. ISBN 978-84-8951241-2.
- Sotto Mayor Pizarro, José Augusto (1997). Linhagens Medievais Portuguesas: Genealogias e Estratégias (1279–1325) (Thesis) (in Portuguese). Vol. I. Oporto: Doctorate thesis, author's edition. doi:10.34626/xrt8-8y60. hdl:10216/18023.
- Torres Sevilla-Quiñones de León, Margarita Cecilia (1999). Linajes nobiliarios de León y Castilla: Siglos IX–XIII (in Spanish). Salamanca: Junta de Castilla y León, Consejería de educación y cultura. ISBN 84-7846-781-5.

Afonso I of Portugal House of Burgundy Cadet branch of the House of Capet Born: 1106, 1109 or 1111 Died: 6 December 1185
Regnal titles
New title Independence from León	King of Portugal; 1139–1185	Succeeded by Sancho I
Titles of nobility
Preceded by Henry and Theresa	Count of Portugal; 1112–1139 with Theresa (1112–1126)	Independence
