= Lorvão =

- Civil parish
- Coat of arms

- Location in Portugal
- Coordinates: 40.261°N 8.316°W
- Country: Portugal
- Region: Centro
- Intermunic. comm.: Região de Coimbra
- District: Coimbra
- Municipality: Penacova

Area
  - Total: 26.95 km^{2} (10.41 sq mi)

Population (2011)
  - Total: 3,898
  - Density: 144.6/km^{2} (374.6/sq mi)
- Time zone: UTC+00:00 (WET)
  - Summer (DST): UTC+01:00 (WEST)
- Website: www.freguesia-lorvao.eu

Lorvão is a parish in Penacova Municipality, Portugal. The population in 2011 was 3,898, in an area of 26.95 km². Within the Parish of Lorvão are the following places and towns: Foz do Caneiro, Caneiro, São Mamede, Aveleira, Roxo, Paradela do Lorvão, Chelo, Rebordosa.

== See also ==
- Apocalypse of Lorvão
