= Sancho I of Portugal =

King of Portugal from 1185 to 1211

Sancho I
- King of Portugal, King of Silves
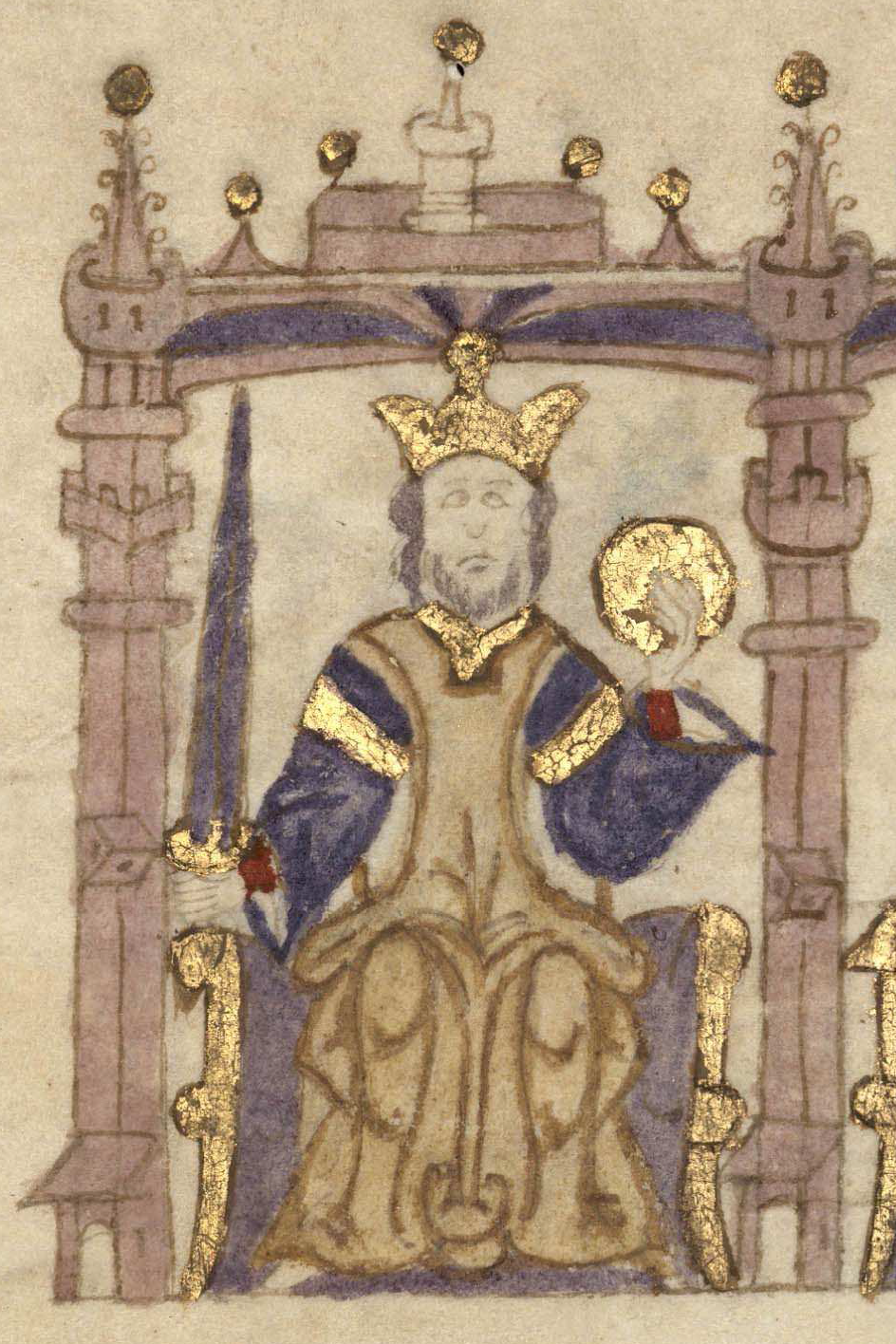
- Depiction in the Castilian manuscript Compendium of Chronicles of Kings, c. 1312–1325

King of Portugal
- Reign: 6 December 1185 – 26 March 1211
- Coronation: 9 December 1185
- Predecessor: Afonso I
- Successor: Afonso II
- Born: Martinho; 11 November 1154; Coimbra, Kingdom of Portugal
- Died: 26 March 1211 (aged 56); Coimbra, Kingdom of Portugal
- Burial: Santa Cruz Monastery, Coimbra
- Spouse: Dulce of Aragon (m. 1174; died 1198)
- Issue Among others...: Teresa, Queen of León; Sancha, Lady of Alenquer; Afonso II, King of Portugal; Peter I, Count of Urgell; Ferdinand, Count of Flanders; Mafalda, Queen of Castile; Branca, Lady of Guadalajara; Berengaria, Queen of Denmark
- House: Portuguese House of Burgundy
- Father: Afonso I of Portugal
- Mother: Matilda of Savoy

Sancho I (born Martinho; Coimbra, 11 November 1154 – 26 March 1211) also referred to as Sancho the Populator ("Sancho o Povoador"), was King of Portugal from 1185 until his death in 1211. He was the second king of Portugal.

Sancho was the second but only surviving legitimate son and fifth child of Afonso I of Portugal by his wife, Matilda of Savoy. Sancho succeeded his father and was crowned in Coimbra when he was 31 years old on 9 December 1185. He used the title King of Silves from 1189 until he lost the territory to Almohad control in 1191.

== Early life ==
Sancho was baptized with the name Martin (Martinho) since he was born on the feast day of Saint Martin of Tours.

As king Afonso was physically unable to ride and therefore lead his host on campaign following the siege of Badajoz in 1169, prince Sancho was knighted at the Church of Santa Cruz in Coimbra on August 15, 1170. From then on he became his second in command, both administratively and militarily. A few weeks later in September the prince led a new siege against the now severely weakened Badajoz but the city was once again relieved on time, not just by Leonese forces but by an Almohad army commanded by Abu Hafs Umar ibn Yahya al-Hintati as well. The Portuguese therefore withdrew in good order in October or early November.

At this time, the independence of Portugal (declared in 1139) was not firmly established. The kings of León and Castile were trying to re-annex the country and the Roman Catholic Church was late in giving its blessing and approval. Due to this situation Afonso I had to search for allies within the Iberian Peninsula. Portugal made an alliance with the Crown of Aragon and together they fought Castile and León. To secure the agreement, Sancho married Dulce, younger sister of King Alfonso II of Aragon, in 1174. Aragon was thus the first Iberian kingdom to recognize the independence of Portugal.

Portugal signed a truce with the Almohad Caliphate in 1173 but once this truce was over Sancho led a daring raid deep into Muslim territory, which became known as the Triana Raid. It was one of the most daring military operations conducted in the history of Portugal and allowed the prince Sancho to affirm himself as a worthy commander and heir to the throne.

== Reign ==
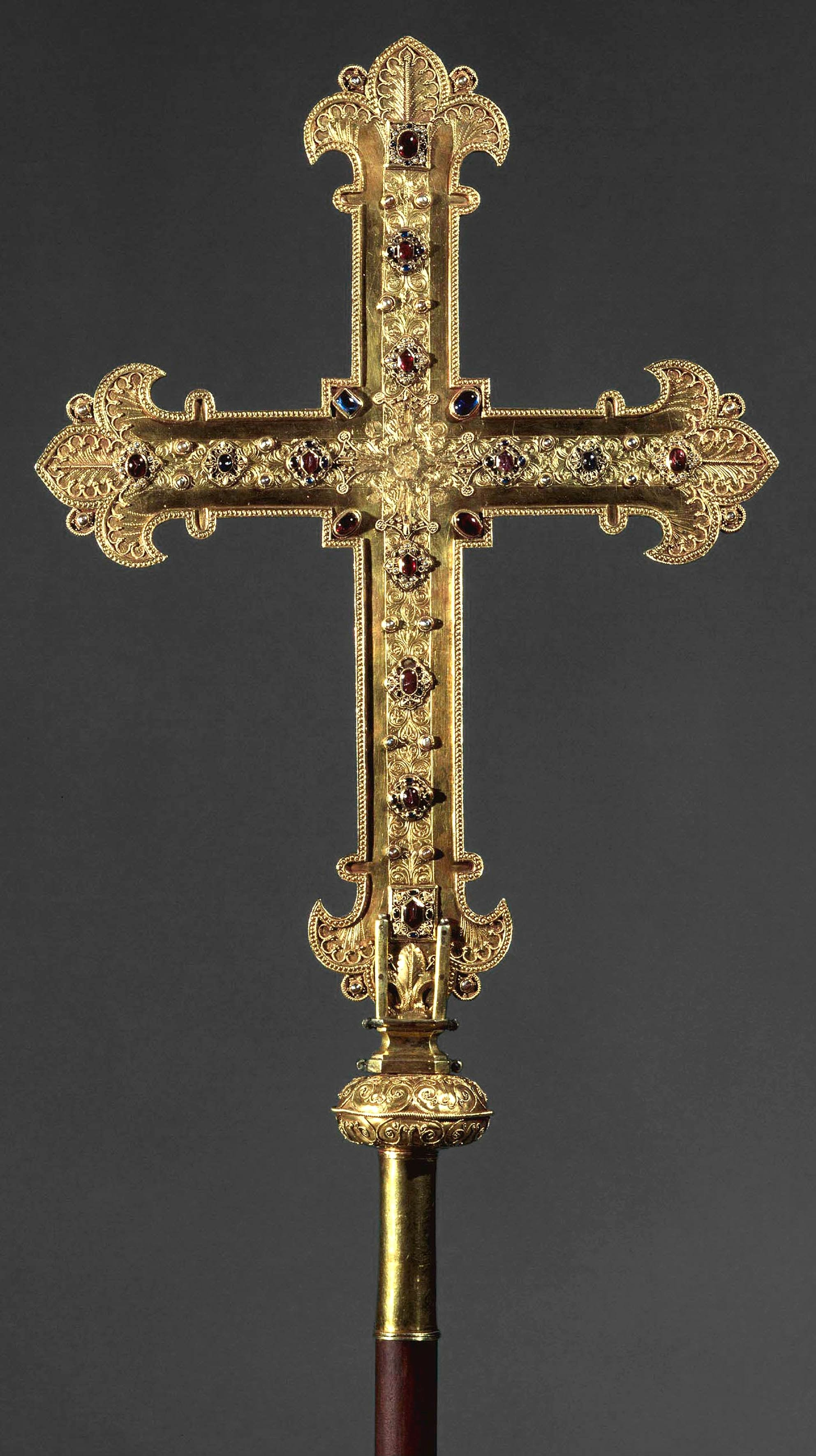
Solid gold cross of Sancho I

With the death of Afonso I in 1185, Sancho I became the second king of Portugal. Coimbra was the centre of his kingdom. Sancho terminated the exhausting and generally pointless wars against his neighbours for control of the Galician borderlands to turn all of his attentions to the south instead.

With the help of some soldiers on their way to join the Third Crusade, he sacked Alvor and took Silves in 1189, an event recounted in detail by an eyewitness in De itinere navali. Silves was an important city of al-Andalus, an administrative and commercial town with a population estimated at around 20,000 people. Sancho ordered the fortification of the city and built a castle which is today an important monument of Portuguese heritage. At the time he also styled himself "By the Grace of God, King of Portugal and Silves (Dei Gratiæ, Rex Portugalliæ et Silbis)". However, military attention soon had to be turned again to the north, as León and Castile threatened Portuguese borders again.

The capture of Silves by the Portuguese caused outrage in al-Andalus and the Maghreb, then ruled by the Almohads. The Almohad caliph Yaqub al-Mansur organized a major campaign in Iberia. Portugal was invaded by a large Almohad force in 1190 but it faltered at the siege of Tomar, a major Templar castle. At that time, Sancho was to be found at Lisbon, where he enlisted the help of a Crusader force which docked at the city en-route to the Holy Land. Yet by the time he moved out to relieve Tomar the Almohads had already retreated. Portugal suffered another, better-prepared Almohad invasion the following year. Silves was again lost to the Moors in 1191. All Portuguese territory south of the Tagus was lost, with the exception of the heavily fortified city of Évora, which remained as a Christian enclave in Muslim territory.

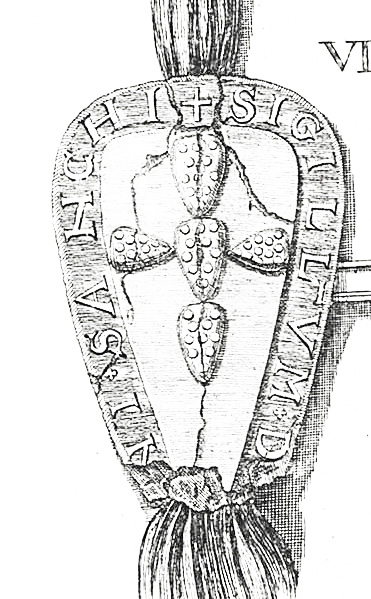
1189 seal of Sancho I.

Sancho I dedicated much of his reign to political and administrative organization of the new kingdom. He accumulated a national treasure, supported new industries and the middle class of merchants. Moreover, he created several new towns and villages (like Guarda in 1199) and took great care in populating remote areas in the northern Christian regions of Portugal – hence the nickname "the Populator". The king was also known for his love of knowledge and literature. Sancho I wrote several books of poems and used the royal treasure to send Portuguese students to European universities. He died in Coimbra, aged 56.

== Marriage and issue ==
Sancho married Dulce of Aragon, daughter of Ramon Berenguer IV, Count of Barcelona and Petronilla, Queen of Aragon. Eleven children were born from this marriage, eight of whom reached adulthood:

- Theresa (1175/1176 – 18 June 1250), married Alfonso IX of León and was beatified in 1705;
- Sancha (1180 – 13 March 1229), founded the Monastery of Celas near Coimbra where she lived until her death. Her sister Theresa arranged for her burial at the Monastery of Lorvão. She was beatified by Pope Clement XI in 1705, the same year as Theresa;
- Constanza (May 1182 – before 1186 or August 1202). According to Rodrigues Oliveira, she must have died before 1186 since her name is not registered in any of the documents of the chancellery of Sancho I which begins in that year. However, the necrology of São Salvador de Moreira records the death "III Nonas Augusti" in 1202 of "Domna Constantia Infantula filia regis domni Sancii et reginæ domnæ Dulciæ";
- Afonso (23 April 1186 – 25 March 1223), succeeded his father as the third king of Portugal;
- Raimundo (1187/88 – 9 March bef. 1188/89), died in infancy; (Note: The necrology of Santa Cruz de Coimbra records the death "VII Id Mar" of "dominus Raimundus filius domini regis Sancii et reginæ donnæ Dulciæ"; A. Brandaõ: Quarta Parte da Monarchia Lusitana, Lisbon 1632, Liber XII cap. XXI, p. 33. He was presumably not alive in Mar 1189, the date of his father's charter in which he is not named. Raimundo was probably not his parents' oldest son as naming the first son after his maternal grandfather was unusual. If that is correct, the known dates of birth of his siblings indicate that Raimundo was born either in 1186 or after 1189.)
- Peter (23 February 1187 – 2 June 1258), married Aurembiaix, Countess of Urgell;
- Ferdinand (24 March 1188 – 27 July 1233), married Joan, Countess of Flanders;
- Henry (aft. March 1189 – 8 Dec aft. 1189), died in infancy; (Note: The Nobiliario of Pedro Conde de Barcelos names "D. Alonso Sanchez, El Infante D. Pedro, El Infante D. Fernando Conde de Flandes, El Infante D. Enrique" as the sons of "D. Sancho Rey de Portugal" and his wife "D. Aldonça"; Pedro Barcelos, Tit. VII, Reyes de Portugal, 3 p. 30. He was presumably born after, or only shortly before, his father's charter dated March 1189. Sousa says that the necrology of Santa Cruz de Coimbra records the death 8 December of Infante dom Henrique, but he does not quote the wording in the source or provide a citation reference.)
- Mafalda (1195/1196 – 1 May 1256), married Henry I of Castile and was beatified in 1793;
- Branca (1198 – 17 November 1240), probably the twin sister of Berengaria, was raised in the court with her father and his mistress "a Ribeirinha" and, when she was eight or ten years old, was sent to live with her sisters at the Monastery of Lorvão. She was a nun at a convent in Guadalajara and was buried at the same monastery as her mother;
- Berengaria (1198 – 27 March 1221), probably the twin sister of Branca, married Valdemar II of Denmark in 1214.

=== Illegitimate Children ===
With Maria Aires de Fornelos, daughter of Aires Nunes de Fornelos and Maior Pais, who was buried at the Monastery of Santo Tirso in accordance with her last will, Sancho had two children, both born before his marriage to Dulce of Aragon: (Note: Maria later married Gil Vasques de Soverosa with whom, in 1175, jointly with the two children she had with Sancho appears in the Monastery of Santo Tirso making a donation to some relatives.)

- Martim Sanches (born before 1175) Count of Trastámara. Martim married Elo Pérez de Castro, daughter of Pedro Fernández de Castro, with no issue from this marriage;
- Urraca Sanches (born before 1175), was married to Lourenço Soares, son of Soeiro Viegas and Sancha Bermúdez de Traba.

After Dulce's death, he had an affair with Maria Pais de Ribeira "a Ribeirinha" for whom he is often said to have written and dedicated a cantiga de amigo, A Ribeirinha, composed in 1199, the oldest text known in Portuguese poetry. That is contested nowadays by the Portuguese historian António de Resende Oliveira, who claims this cantiga was composed by Alfonso X of Castile or perhaps Sancho II of Portugal. At least six children were born of this relationship:

- Rodrigo Sanches (died 1245), had a bastard son with Constança Afonso de Cambra called Afonso Rodrigues, a Franciscan friar and the "Guardian of the Convent of Lisbon";
- Gil Sanches (died on 14 September 1236), a cleric and troubadour, his father left him 8,000 morabetinos in his will. Gil granted fueros to the settlers of Sardezas in 1213;
- Nuno Sanches, died during childhood on a 16 December in an unknown year. He could have been the son of Maria Aires de Fornelos;
- Maior Sanches, also died at an early age on 27 August of an unknown year;
- Teresa Sanches, her father left her 7,000 morabetinos in his will. She was the second wife of Alfonso Téllez de Meneses whom she married before 1220 and with whom she had issue;
- Constança Sanches (1204 – 8 August 1269). Her father left her 7,000 morabetinos in his will. She was the godmother of her grand-niece Infanta Sancha and left her half of Vila do Conde, Avelaneda, Pousadela, Parada and Maçãs. She also owned estates in Torres Vedras.

Sancho had a son with Maria Moniz de Ribeira, daughter of Munio Osorio, tenente of the comarca of Cabreira and Ribera, and of Maria Nunes of Grijó:

- Pedro Moniz, who married a woman whose name is not recorded, and was the father of Maria Peres de Cabreira, the wife of Martim Peres Machado, the first to use the last name Machado.

== See also ==
- Timeline of Portuguese history (First Dynasty)
- Portugal in the Middle Ages
  - Portugal in the Reconquista

== Bibliography ==
- Álvarez Palenzuela, Vicente Ángel (2013). "El componente cruzado de la Reconquista". Mundos medievales: espacios, sociedades y poder (in Spanish). Universidad de Cantabria. pp. 59–70. ISBN 978-8481026504.
- Caetano de Souza, Antonio (1735). Historia Genealógica de la Real Casa Portuguesa (PDF) (in Portuguese). Vol. I. Lisbon: Lisboa Occidental, na oficina de Joseph Antonio da Sylva. ISBN 978-84-8109-908-9.
- Carvalho Correia, Francisco (2008). O Mosteiro de Santo Tirso de 978 a 1588: a silhueta de uma entidade projectada no chao de uma história milenária (in Portuguese). Santiago de Compostela: Universidade de Santiago de Compostela: Servizo de Publicacións e Intercambio Científico. ISBN 978-84-9887-038-1. Archived from the original on 4 October 2013.
- Mattoso, José (2014). D. Afonso Henriques (in Portuguese). Lisbon: Temas e Debates. ISBN 978-972-759-911-0.
- Rodrigues Oliveira, Ana (2010). Rainhas medievais de Portugal. Dezassete mulheres, duas dinastias, quatro séculos de História (in Portuguese). Lisbon: A esfera dos livros. ISBN 978-989-626-261-7.
- Sotto Mayor Pizarro, José Augusto (1997). Linhagens Medievais Portuguesas: Genealogias e Estratégias (1279-1325) (in Portuguese). Oporto: Doctorate thesis, author's edition. hdl:10216/18023.
- Sotto Mayor Pizarro, José Augusto (1987). Os Patronos do Mosteiro de Grijó (in Portuguese). Oporto. ISBN 978-0883-1886-37.

Sancho I of Portugal House of Burgundy Cadet branch of the Capetian dynasty Born: 11 November 1154 Died: 26 March 1211
Regnal titles
Preceded by Afonso I	King of Portugal; 1185–1211	Succeeded by Afonso II
