= Military history of Portugal =

The military history of Portugal is as long as the history of the country, from before the emergence of the independent Portuguese state.

== Before Portugal ==
Before the emergence of Portugal, between the 9th and the 12th centuries, its territory was part of important military conflicts – these were mainly the result of three processes.

=== Roman expansion ===
- The conflict between Ancient Rome and Carthage for the dominion of the western Mediterranean sea mainly occurred in Iberia (the Roman Hispania) during the Second Punic War from 218 to 201 BC.

Roman conquest of Hispania (218 BC to 17 BC)

- The Roman conquest of Hispania, a long process from 218 BC (in the context of the Second Punic War) to 17 BC (already during Emperor Augustus), had three major confrontations regarding modern Portuguese territory:
  - The Lusitanian War from 155 to 139 BC, between the Romans and the Lusitanians, namely during the period these were led by Viriatus.
  - The expedition and conquest of Gallaecia (north of Portugal and Galicia), from 135 and 132 BC, led by Consul Decimus Junius Brutus Callaicus.
  - The Cantabrian Wars from 29 to 19 BC, in the last stade [sic?] of Roman conquest, that, although not directed at populations in the present Portuguese territory, greatly involved military movements in what is now the north of Portugal.
- The Roman republican civil wars that took place, wholly or partially, in Hispania, even if in interaction and connection to the process of conquest, namely:
  - Sertorius' revolt in Hispania, from 83 to 72 BC, under the leadership of Sertorius.
  - Caesar's Civil War, from 49 to 45 BC, between Julius Caesar and the optimates (conservative republicans), initially led by Pompey.

=== Germanic expansion ===
Hispania in 560

The invasions during the Migration Period and the Decline of the Roman Empire, in the beginning of the 5th century, and the subsequent conflicts between conquerors (until the 8th century), namely:

- Invasion of Roman Gallaecia by the Germanic Suebi (Quadi and Marcomanni) under king Hermeric, accompanied by the Buri in 409.
- Invasion of Hispania by the Germanic Vandals (Silingi – established in Baetica, and Hasdingi – established in interior Gallaecia, near the Suebi) and the Sarmatian Alans (established in Roman Lusitania), in 409.
- Invasion of Hispania by the Germanic Visigoths led by King Theodoric, expanding from Aquitaine and under request by the Romans, in 410, establishing the Visigothic Kingdom of Hispania.
- The war between The Suevi and the Hasdingi Vandals, where the first resisted with Roman aid, in 419.
- The war between the Alans and the Suevi and Romans where the last two are defeated at the Battle of Mérida, in 428.
- The war between the Visigoths and the Vandal–Alanic alliance, that ended in 429, with most of the Vandals and Alans moving to North Africa.
- The on and off continuous dynastic disputes between the Suevi.
- The on and off continuous war between the Suevi and the Visigoths, that ended when the Visigothic king, Liuvigild, conquered the Kingdom of the Suebi in 585.
- The war between the Visigothic Kingdom of Hispania and the Byzantine Empire in its southern Iberian province of Spania, from 552 until 624.
- The dynastic and civil war in the Visigothic Kingdom between the supporters of Achila II (controlling most of eastern Hispania) and Roderic (controlling most of western Iberia).

=== Islamic expansion and Christian standoff ===
- The Moorish Umayyad conquest of Hispania, from 711 to 718, taking advantage of the civil war, and that established the Islamic Al-Andalus.
- The Reconquista started as an insurgency in Asturias in 722. Currently Historians and archaeologists generally agree that Northern Portugal, between the Minho and the Douro rivers, kept a significant share of its population, in social and political Christian area that until the late 9th century there were no acting political powers. However, in late 9th century, the region is part of a structure of powers, the Galician–Asturian, Leonese and Portuguese power structures. The county of Portugal slowly grew in power and territory forming a separate Kingdom of Portugal which expanded at the expense of the Moorish states of Al-Andalus, finishing its Reconquista in 1249.

== Portuguese Reconquista (868–1249) ==
=== County of Portugal ===
The county of Portugal is traditionally considered to be formed upon the reconquest of Porto by Vímara Peres in 868, who received the county as reward by Alfonso III of Asturias. The military history of this county, in its 381 years of existence, was marked by battles against both fellow Christian and Muslim forces.

In the context of the Reconquista, the County of Portugal expanded southward against Muslim forces, with considerable periods of conquest and loss. Some notable military conflicts within this period include the siege of Coimbra in 1064 (by the Portuguese), the capture of Santarém in 1111 (by the Almoravids) and the siege of Coimbra in 1117 (in which the Almoravids failed to capture Coimbra). In the Battle of Ourique (1139), then count Afonso Henriques won a victory against the Amoravid forces after which he would proclaim himself King of Portugal, with the support of his troops.

As the county of Portugal slowly grew in power, it often fought against Christian forces. In the Battle of Aguioncha (966/967), Gonzalo Menéndez, count of Portugal, defeats Galician count Rodrigo Velázquez. Portugal's counts later started to style themselves as dukes, one of which became regent of the Kingdom of León between 999 and 1008 (Menendo González). In 1070, the Portuguese count Nuno Mendes wished the Portuguese title and the Battle of Pedroso was fought on 18 February 1071, the count being killed in combat led by Garcia II of Galicia. The later annexed the county and started to styled himself as "King of Portugal and Galicia" (Garcia Rex Portugallie et Galleciae). Garcia's brothers, Sancho II of Castille and Alfonso VI of Leon, united and annexed Garcia's Kingdom during that same year who agreed to split it among themselves, however the king of Castille was killed by a noble in that same year and Alfonso took Castille for himself and Garcia recovered his kingdom of Portugal and Galicia, but in 1073 the Alfonso VI gathered all power and started to style himself as Imperator totius Hispaniæ (Emperor of All Hispania) since 1077. When the Emperor died, the Crown was left for his daughter Urraca, while Teresa inherited the County of Portugal. In the Battle of São Mamede (1128), Afonso Henriques defeats his mother's forces, leading him to proclaim himself Prince of Portugal as its new ruler. In the Luso–Leonese War (1130–1137), Afonso Henriques and his cousin Alfonso VII of León and Castile would fight over territorial claims in Galicia, ending with the Treaty of Tuy in which, supposedly, Afonso Henriques recognized his cousin's authority in matters of land ownership. Conflict between the two parties would continue, namely in the Battle of Cerneja (1139) and with Henrique's proclamation as King in the aftermath of the Battle of Ourique (vs. the Almoravids).

=== Kingdom of Portugal ===
- Battle of Valdevez - 1140/1141 (vs. Kingdom of Léon)
- Siege of Lisbon - 1142
- Conquest of Santarém - 1147
- Siege of Lisbon - 1147
- Luso-Leonese War (1162-1165)
- Luso–Leonese War (1167–1169)
- Siege of Santarém - 1184
- Siege of Silves - 1189
- Almohad campaign against Portugal (1190–1191) - 1190-1991
- Siege of Alcácer do Sal - 1217
- Siege of Faro - 1249

=== Military history in modern-day Portugal at the Reconquista time outside the Kingdom of Portugal ===
- Murīdūn - 1140 (Sufi revolt in Almoravid-occupied Mértola)
- Alvor massacre - 1189 (Christian crusaders during the Third Crusade against Almohad-occupied Alvor)

== Imperial expansion ==
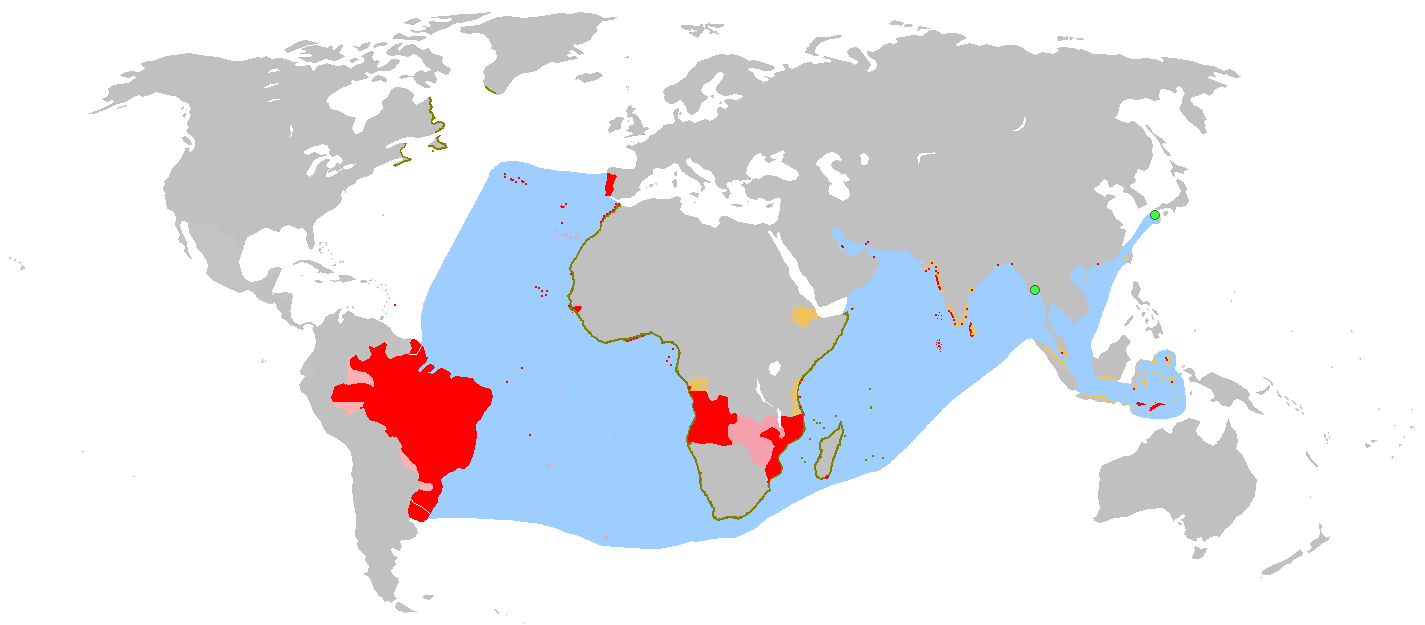
An anachronous map of the Portuguese Empire (1415–1999). Red – actual possessions; Pink – explorations, areas of influence and trade and claims of sovereignty; Blue – main sea explorations, routes and areas of influence. The disputed discovery of Australia is not shown.

- Portuguese–Mamluk war
- Persian–Portuguese war
- Portuguese intervention in Abyssinia
- Portuguese conquest of Jaffna Kingdom
- Dutch–Portuguese War
- Battle of Alcácer Quibir
- Ottoman–Portuguese conflicts
  - Conquest of Tunis (1535)
  - Ottoman–Portuguese conflicts (1538–57)
  - Ottoman–Portuguese conflicts (1558–66)
  - Ottoman–Portuguese conflicts (1580–89)
  - Ottoman–Venetian War (1714–18) (in support of the Republic of Venice)
  - Ethiopian–Adal War (in support of the Ethiopian Empire)
- Kongo-Portuguese conflicts
  - Battle of Mbumbi
  - Battle of Mbanda Kasi
  - Battle of Mbwila
  - Battle of Kitombo
- Guaraní War
- Portuguese conquest of the Banda Oriental
- Japanese-Portuguese conflicts

== Conflicts with Spain ==
- War of the Portuguese Succession
- Portuguese Restoration War
- War of the Spanish Succession
  - Portugal in the War of Spanish Succession
- Spanish–Portuguese War (1735–37)
- Spanish–Portuguese War (1761–63)
- Spanish–Portuguese War (1776–77)
- Seven Years' War
  - Fantastic War

== The Napoleonic Wars ==
=== Instability prior to the French invasions ===
==== Riots of Campo de Ourique and conspiracy of the Marquis of Alorna (1803) ====
On 24 and 25 July 1803, in Campo de Ourique, Lisbon, a regiment of infantry commanded by liberal army man Gomes Freire de Andrade and the Legion of Light Troops commanded by the also liberal-leaning Marquis of Alorna mutinied against the state authorities, entering in confrontation with the then recently created Royal Guard of the Police. The end of the mutinies, of forcing political liberalism on Portuguese government, did not succeed.

==== Conspiracy of Mafra (1805) ====
In 1805, then Princess regent (soon afterwards Queen) Carlota Joaquina promoted a conspiracy in Mafra with the objective of removing her husband Prince João from regency by claiming him to be mentally incapable, assuming regency on her own in his place, being aided in the attempted coup by the Count of Sabugal, the Marquis of Ponte de Lima, the Count of Sarzedas, the Marquis of Alorna and Francisco de Melo. The attempted conspiracy did not succeed, but it did increase the tension between the couple to the point of a divorce or separation being considered, which was never advanced due to the damage that it would bring to the Portuguese state, and the couple still had two children after the attempted conspiracy of Carlota (Maria da Assunção, born in 1805, and Ana de Jesus Maria, born in 1806), although there are suspicions about the possibility of the four children of the couple born after 1801, including the 1802-born Miguel, were not children of João but of one or several of the lovers of Carlota Joaquina).

==== Riots of Saint Torcato (1805) ====
The riots of Saint Torcato was a popular uprising in the Portuguese country side with a strong mixture of religious influence and zealotry.

=== Peninsular War (1807–14) ===
==== First invasion ====
During the Napoleonic Wars, Portugal was, for a time, Britain's only ally on the continent. Throughout the war, Portugal maintained a military of about 200–250 thousand troops worldwide. In 1807, after the Portuguese government's refusal to participate in the Continental System, French troops under General Junot invaded Portugal, taking Lisbon. However, a popular revolt against Junot's government broke out in the summer of 1808 and Portuguese irregulars took up arms against the French. This enabled a British army under Arthur Wellesley to be landed in Portugal where, aided by Portuguese troops, they defeated Junot at the Battle of Vimeiro; this first French invasion was ended by the Convention of Sintra negotiated by his superiors, which allowed Junot's men to withdraw unmolested with their plunder. Meanwhile, the general revolt against the French in Spain led to the landing of Sir John Moore in the north of that country, forcing Napoleon himself to lead an army into the Peninsula. Though Moore was killed, the British managed to extricate themselves from the Peninsula in the Battle of La Coruña. Portugal itself, however, remained independent of the French, and Napoleon left things in the Iberian Peninsula in the hands of Marshal Soult.

==== Second and third invasions ====
Soult proceeded to invade Portugal in the north. However, the Portuguese held on, giving the British the impetus to send Wellesley back with additional regiments of troops to help recover the Iberian peninsula. Wellesley, aided by the remaining Portuguese regiments hastily scraped together, liberated Portugal. A third invasion took place, led by Marshal André Masséna. The Anglo-Portuguese Army managed to halt the French advance at the fortifications of Torres Vedras and successfully defeat Masséna's troops, and slowly recovered the Iberian peninsula. Wellesley was made Duke of Wellington in recognition of his services. The Portuguese army was put under the command of Marshal Beresford and was most heavily engaged under his leadership in the bloody Battle of Albuera. Portuguese forces also formed part of Wellington's advance into southern France, in 1813–14.

- Lines of Torres Vedras

==== Persecutions of the Setembrizada (1810) ====
The Setembrizada was the arrest and deportation of a group of personalities connected to the Portuguese Freemasonry, Jacobinist currents and following of the ideals of the French Revolution who had collaborated with the French occupation during the First Invasion, with the first detentions occurring between 10 and 13 September 1810 (hence the name setembrizada), after the entry of the Second Invasion led by general Jean-de-Dieu Soult. By 1814, King João VI gave an amnesty to all the former collaborationists.

== Civil Wars (1820–51) ==
=== Liberal Revolution (1820) ===
==== Martinhada (1820) ====
On 11 November 1820 (day of St. Martin, hence the name of the revolt, also known in slang as "o imbróglio", "the plot" or "a pavorosa", "the dreadful one"), a group of military leaders known as exaltados (exalted ones), who challenged the civilian rule in which the 1820 liberal Provisional Junta of Supreme Government of the Kingdom was falling and also what they considered to be the moderate proposals of a constitutional being drawn under influence of the liberal orator Manuel Fernandes Tomás, defending instead the immediate adoption of the Cádiz Constitution or even a more advanced liberal one. These groups rose up in a paradoxical wide informal coalition with conservative military and politicians and radical bourgeois people. It had a brief success, but by 17 November that year a counter-coup restores Manuel Fernandes to leadership of the Junta, forcing some Martinhada leaders, like Gaspar Teixeira de Magalhães e Lacerda, António da Silveira Pinto da Fonseca and Bernardo de Sá Nogueira, forced to exile, and only the sections of the Constitution relating to electoral instructions are adopted, at 22 November 1820, with the first elections after the 1820 Revolution (the elections for the General Extraordinary and Constituting Courts, that is, the Constitution writing constituting assembly) occurring under those instructions between 10 and 27 December 1820.

=== The Vilafrancada (1823) ===
The Vilafrancada was the first of two uprisings of Prince D. Miguel's uprisings supported by several other people of traditionalist and absolutist leanings, against the liberalism adopted by his father D. João VI in the later phase of his rule.

=== The Abrilada (1824) ===
On 30 April 1824, Prince D. Miguel rose again against his father. The King took refuge aboard the British ship Windsor Castle, with the aid of the Portuguese diplomatic corp, while grandes of the kingdom like the Duke of Palmela were arrested in Belém, being then moved to imprisonment in Peniche, with the then intendent-general of police Baron of Rendufe being persecuted by the Miguelist rise-up, which then turned its attentions to the Count of Vila Flor (later more famous for his future title of Duke of Terceira) and the Count of Paraty. The reactionary philosopher José Agostinho de Macedo was one of the leaders of the rallying up of support among the masses for the movement, denouncing the prisoners the movement made at political rallies. On 13 May, D. Miguel was finally forced to leave for exile on board the frigate Pérola towards France, while on the following day D. João returned to Bemposta, and impeached the brutal pro-Miguelist Minister of Justice José António de Oliveira Leite de Barros, replacing him by Friar Patrício da Silva, and the Duke of Palmela was promoted to Minister of the Kingdom.

=== Disturbances of 1826–27 ===
- Riots of Trás-os-Montes
- Sublevation of the Royal Police Guard
- Rebellion of Algarve and Alentejo
- Archotada
- Miguelite riots in Coimbra

=== The Liberal Wars (1828–34) ===
After the Napoleonic War, the British ruled Portugal in the name of the absent king in Brazil, with Beresford as de facto Regent, until the Liberal Revolution of 1820 when they were driven out and the king was forced to return as a constitutional monarch. Over the next 25 years the fledgling Portuguese democracy experienced several military upheavals, especially the Liberal Wars fought between the brothers Dom Pedro, ex-Emperor of Brazil and the absolutist usurper Dom Miguel. To assert the cause of the rightful Queen, his daughter Maria da Glória, Pedro sailed from Terceira in the Azores with an expeditionary force consisting of 60 vessels, 7500 men including the Count of Vila Flor, Alexandre Herculano, Almeida Garrett, Joaquim António de Aguiar, José Travassos Valdez and a volunteer British contingent under the command of Colonels George Lloyd Hodges and Charles Shaw and effected a Landing at Mindelo on the shores north of Porto. On 9 July Porto was taken by the liberal forces, and after an inconclusive result at the Battle of Ponte Ferreira on 22–23 July were besieged in the city by the Miguelites for nearly a year until, in July 1833, the Duke of Terceira (as Vila Flor had now been created) was able to land in the Algarve and defeat Miguel's forces at the Battle of Almada. Meanwhile, Miguel's fleet was comprehensively defeated by Pedro's much smaller squadron, commanded by Charles Napier, in the fourth Battle of Cape St. Vincent. The Miguelites were driven out of Lisbon but returned and attacked the city in force, unsuccessfully. Miguel was finally defeated at the Battle of Asseiceira, 16 May 1834, and capitulated a few days later with the Concession of Evoramonte. He was exiled, though his supporters continued to plot for his return and cause trouble up to the 1850s.

- Liberal revolt in Porto (1828)
- Belfastada (1828)
- Revolt of the Royal Navy Brigade (1829)
- Revolt of Lisbon (1831)
- Revolt of the 2nd Infantry Regiment (1831)
- Siege of Porto and civil war (1832–33)

=== Guerrilla of the Remexido (1835–38) ===
==== Other guerrillas ====
In the period of instability after the end of the Portuguese Civil War, several guerrillas happened between pro-governmental and anti-governmental local groups and between local groups and government forces, both by forces of the defeated Miguelites who kept the guerrillas and between different factions of Portuguese liberals. Among these were included:

- Guerrilla of Jorge Boto (a Miguelite guerrilla in the Beira Alta region just after the end of the Civil War and also in the last years of given war)
- Guerrilla of Dom Manuel Martinini (a liberal guerrilla in the last days of the Civil War and first years right after its end led by a former Spanish Army officer around Marvão, Alentejo
- Guerrilla of Galamba (a liberal guerrilla in coastal Alentejo led by António Manuel Soares Galamba, a liberal politician, MP and guerrilla)
- Guerrilla of Father Góis (a guerrilla in Alentejo led by Priest Francisco Romão de Góis)
- Guerrilla of Milhundos (a guerrilla led by Lieutenant Milhundos)
- Guerrilla of the Marçais
- Guerrilla of the Garranos (one of the many inner Beiras guerrillas in the 1830s and 1840s right after the Civil War)
- Guerrilla of the Brandões (the 1834–1869 guerrillas of the Brandão family, first united but soon divided in two branches, the Chartist and the Septemberist one. The most famous leader of the Brandões guerrillas was João Brandão)
- Several Miguelite guerrillas throughout Portugal besides the Remexido one, lasting some until the Regeneration Coup of 1850

=== Patuleia (1846–47) ===
==== Revolt of Pinotes (1846) ====
The Revolt of Pinotes was the uprising at Viana do Castelo within the bigger Patuleia revolution.

==== Montaria (1847) ====
A failed badly planned attempt of revolt against the government in the afternoon of 29 April 1847, which ended with the imprisonment of several of the involved members.

==== Conspiracy of the Hidras (1848) ====
A conspiratorial movement in Lisbon and Coimbra in August 1848, inspired by the popular and students' uprising of Paris from 22 to 24 February 1848 (which led to the fall of King Louis Philippe I and the proclamation of the Second Republic). It was controlled by the government of the Duke of Saldanha (with detaining of some of the heads of the conspiracy, the remaining ones falling in clandestinity), with the name by which the conspiracy became known deriving from the term used by Saldanha to define the organization ("revolutionary hydra")

== Colonization of Africa ==
In the 19th century, Portugal became involved in the scramble for Africa, enlarging its territories in Portuguese Angola, Portuguese Mozambique, Portuguese Cabinda, and Portuguese Guinea.

== First Republic (1910–26) ==
After the revolution that would establish the First Portuguese Republic, the Republic would suffer many coup attempts, see Portugal enter World War I and end 16 years later with the 28 May 1926 coup d'état.

=== Military instability before World War I ===
==== German incursions in Mozambique (1914) ====
Before the beginning of World War I, Germany already had interests in Portuguese African colonies and had negotiated with the British the possibility of annexation of Angola. German troops fought Portuguese ones in the Maziua raid in Mozambique, August 1914. In October of the same year, the Naulila Incident happened in Angola, which then culminated in the Battle of Naulila and the German campaign in Angola. These events happened while Portugal and Germany were officially at peace.

=== World War I (1916–18) ===
Portugal entered WWI on the 9th of March 1916, after Germany declared war on Portugal, following Portugal's compliance with a British request to confiscate German ships in Portuguese ports. On 15 July of the same year, Portugal is formally invited by the British to join the Allies and on August 7 the Portuguese Parliament accepts Portugal's participation in the war. In December 1916, there are naval confrontations near Funchal. Naval confrontations in the Atlantic, which include sporadic bombardment of land in Madeira and Azores, continue throughout the war, with the last notable event being the Action of 14 October 1918.

==== Mainland Europe (1917–18) ====
Portugal sent an Expeditionary Corps of two reinforced divisions (40,000 men) to France and Belgium, which fought alongside the British XI Corps. German offensives in the British sector hit the Portuguese hard, with one division destroyed on 9 April 1918 in the Battle of La Lys, as it became known in Portugal, or Operation Georgette or the Battle of Estaires to the British. In the Treaty of Versailles, the Portuguese acquired the territory of Kionga from what was once German East Africa.

==== German incursions in Mozambique (1917) ====
A raid by Paul von Lettow-Vorbeck's remaining troops evaded British troops and managed to penetrate relatively far into Portuguese Mozambique, seizing arms, capturing troops, and sparking unrest among the population (African and European). The German forces met Portuguese ones in the Battle of Ngomano, where Portuguese forces were defeated.

== Estado Novo (1926–74) ==
=== Involvement in the Spanish Civil War (1936–39) ===
Salazar gave material and diplomatic aid to Francisco Franco's nationalist forces while maintaining a formal neutrality. A special volunteer force of 18,000, called Os Viriatos (in honour of Lusitanian leader and Portuguese national hero Viriatus), led by regular army officers, was recruited to fight as part of Franco's army, even if unofficially. When the civil war ended in 1939, Portugal and Spain negotiated the Treaty of Friendship and Nonaggression (Iberian Pact). The pact committed the two countries to defend the Iberian Peninsula against any power that attacked either country and helped to ensure Iberian neutrality during World War II.

=== World War II (1939–45) ===
Although Portugal proclaimed neutrality in the conflict, the Japanese Imperial Army invaded the Portuguese Timor colony in distant Oceania, killing thousands of natives and dozens of Portuguese. In response, the Portuguese civilians joined Australia, the Netherlands, the United Kingdom, and the United States against the Japanese. See Battle of Timor.

=== Portuguese–Indian War (1961) ===
The Portuguese–Indian War was a conflict with the Republic of India's armed forces that ended Portuguese rule in its Indian enclaves in 1961. The armed action involved defensive action against air, sea and land strikes by a numerically superior Indian force for over 36 hours, and terminated in Portuguese surrender, ending 451 years of Portuguese rule in Goa. Thirty-one Portuguese and thirty-five Indians were killed in the fighting.

=== Portuguese Colonial War (1961–74) ===
Portugal remained steadfastly neutral in World War II, but became involved in counterinsurgency campaigns against scattered guerrilla movements in Portuguese Angola, Portuguese Mozambique, and Portuguese Guinea. Except in Portuguese Guinea, where the revolutionary PAIGC quickly conquered most of the country, Portugal was able to easily contain anti-government forces through the imaginative use of light infantry, home defense militia, and air-mobile special operations forces, despite arms embargoes from other European countries. During the counterinsurgency campaigns in Angola and Mozambique, Portugal was significantly aided by intelligence provided by native residents who did not support revolutionary forces. However, the ideology of the guerrillas, especially the PAIGC, had a profound impact on the officers of the Portuguese armed forces and a left-wing military coup in Lisbon by Portuguese military officers in 1974 toppled the Caetano government and forced a radical change in government attitudes. Faced with international condemnation of its colonial policies and the increasing cost of administering its colonies, Portugal quickly moved to grant the remainder of its African colonies independence.

== International involvement (1991 to present) ==
Portugal was a founding member of NATO, and, although it had scarce forces, it played a key role in the European approaches. After 1991, Portugal committed several infantry and air-landing battalions to international operations. The Portuguese Army keeps soldiers in Iraq, Jordan, Mali, Central African Republic, Somalia, Mozambique, São Tomé and Príncipe, Kosovo and Baltic states.

Since 1991, Portuguese Armed Forces have participated in the following missions;

NATO missions:

- NATO intervention in Bosnia and Herzegovina;
- Implementation Force in Kosovo;
- Stabilisation Force in Bosnia and Herzegovina;
- Operation Sharp Guard;
- Kosovo Force in Kosovo;
- NATO bombing of Yugoslavia;
- Operation Active Endeavour in Mediterranean;
- Operation Enduring Freedom in Afghanistan;
- International Security Assistance Force in Afghanistan;
- NATO Training Mission in Iraq;
- Operation Enduring Freedom – Horn of Africa;
- Standing NATO Maritime Group 1 since 2005;
- Baltic Air Policing since 2007;
- Operation Ocean Shield;
- Icelandic Air Policing since (2012 and 2022)
- Standing NATO Maritime Group 2 (2012 and 2014);
- NATO Assurance Measures in Romania;
- Operation Sea Guardian since 2016;
- Resolute Support Mission in Afghanistan;
- Standing NATO Mine Countermeasures Group 1;
- NATO Assurance Measures in Lithuania (2019 and 2021);
- NATO Assurance Measures in Poland (2019 and 2020);
- NATO Tailored Forward Presence in Romania (2021).

United Nations missions:

- United Nations Protection Force
- Operation Provide Comfort
- United Nations Angola Verification Mission II
- United Nations Operation in Mozambique
- United Nations Confidence Restoration Operation in Croatia
- United Nations Angola Verification Mission III
- United Nations Mission in Bosnia and Herzegovina
- United Nations Mission of Observers in Prevlaka
- United Nations Confidence Restoration Operation in Croatia
- United Nations Mission for the Referendum in Western Sahara
- International Force East Timor
- United Nations Transitional Administration in East Timor
- MONUA
- United Nations Mission of Support to East Timor
- United Nations Observer Mission in Liberia
- United Nations Operation in Côte d'Ivoire
- United Nations Operation in Burundi
- United Nations Interim Administration Mission in Kosovo
- United Nations Office in East Timor
- United Nations Interim Force in Lebanon
- United Nations High Commissioner for Refugees in Algeria
- MONUSCO in Democratic Republic of the Congo
- United Nations Assistance Mission in Afghanistan
- United Nations Multidimensional Integrated Stabilization Mission in Mali
- UN Verification Mission in Colombia
- United Nations Integrated Peacebuilding Office in Guinea-Bissau
- MINUSCA in Central African Republic

European Union missions:

- Operation Sophia
- Operation Althea
- Operation Atalanta
- European Union Training Mission in Mali
- European Union Training Mission in Somalia
- European Union Training Mission in the Central African Republic
- Frontex
- Operation Irini
- European Union Training Mission in Mozambique

== See also ==
- List of wars involving Portugal
