= Luso-Leonese War (1130–1137) =

Armed conflict in Galicia

Luso–Leonese War of 1130–1137
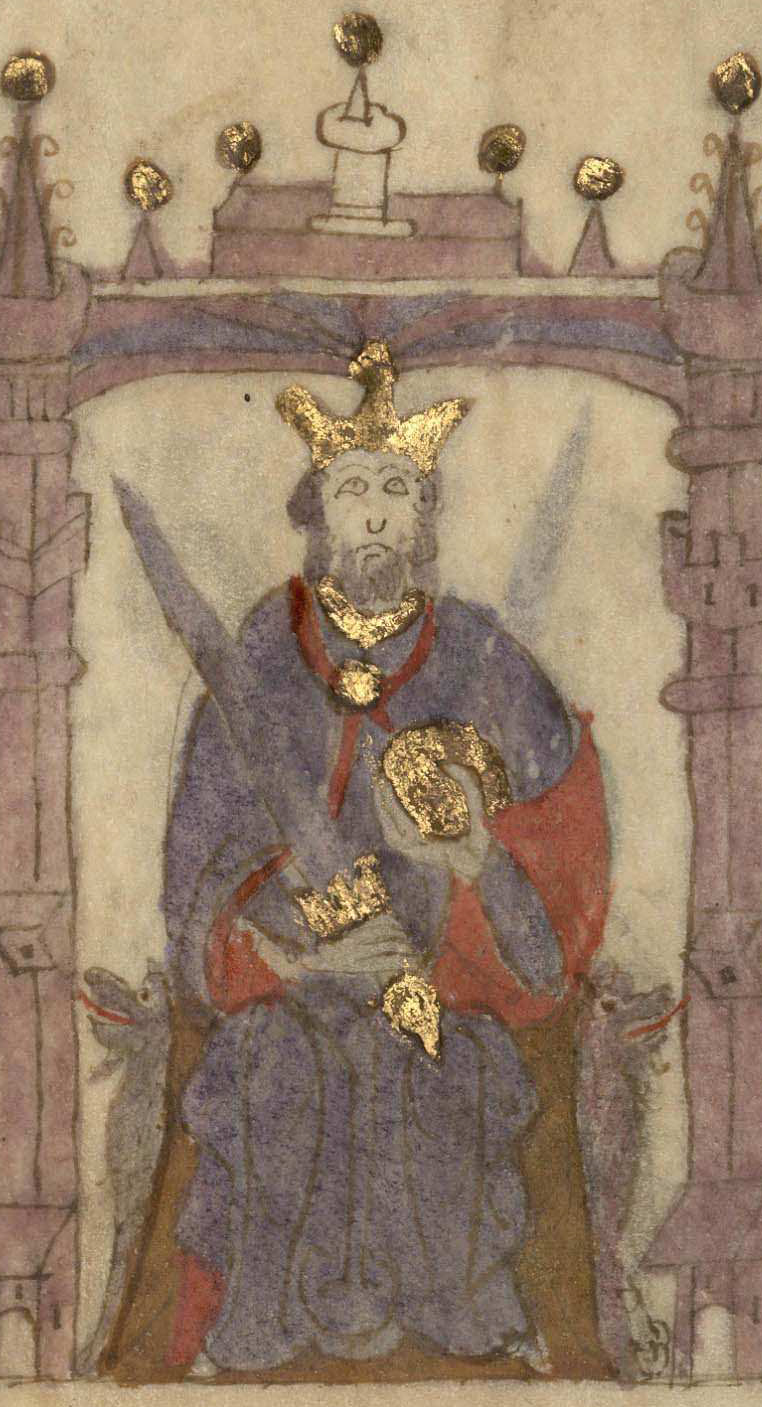
- Medieval painting of Alfonso VII of Leon and Castile
Date	1130–1137
Location	Galicia, Kingdom of Leon
Result	Treaty of Tui

Belligerents
Kingdom of Leon	County of Portugal; Kingdom of Navarre

Commanders and leaders
Alfonso VII; Fernando Pérez de Traba	Afonso Henriques

The Luso–Leonese War of 1130–1137 was an armed conflict between the Kingdom of León and the County of Portugal which took place primarily in the Kingdom of Galicia (part of the Kingdom of León). This war took place during the reigns of Alfonso VII and Afonso Henriques, and was caused by the territorial claims of Afonso over Galicia and the idea of forming an independent Portuguese kingdom, an objective that would later be achieved after the Treaty of Zamora in 1143. The war ended with the signing of the Treaty of Tuy in 1137.

== Background ==
In 1128, Afonso Henriques defeated Theresa and Count Fernando Perez de Traba at the Battle of São Mamede. After this battle, Afonso Henriques became the new Count of Portugal, with the support of the Portuguese nobility. He did not recognise the royal authority of his cousin Alfonso VII of Leon however.

After obtaining authority over the territory of the County of Portugal, he intended to expand the county beyond its horizons, towards the north. The plan was to capture Tuy, Ourense and other Galician towns, which had previously been governed by Theresa and Henry of Burgundy before being confiscated by King Alfonso VII of Leon. Two years after taking the throne of the county, he began his military campaign to take the throne of the Kingdom of Galicia, which at the time was part of the Kingdom of Leon.

== War ==
=== First Campaign of Galicia (1130) ===
In 1130, Afonso Henriques decided to take advantage of the recent conflict between León and Navarre to carry out an organised attack on Galicia. Alfonso VII, being busy in Navarre, and faced with rebellion in Castile, had to send a message to the Galician nobles in order that they should take care of formulating an organised defence to stop the Portuguese attacks on their territory. However, due to internal discord and conflict, many Galician nobles renounced their loyalty to Alfonso VII to join Afonso Henriques' conquering initiative, which made it possible for Afonso Henríquez to emerge unscathed from his campaigns.

=== Truce and rebellion of Bermudo Pérez de Traba (1131) ===
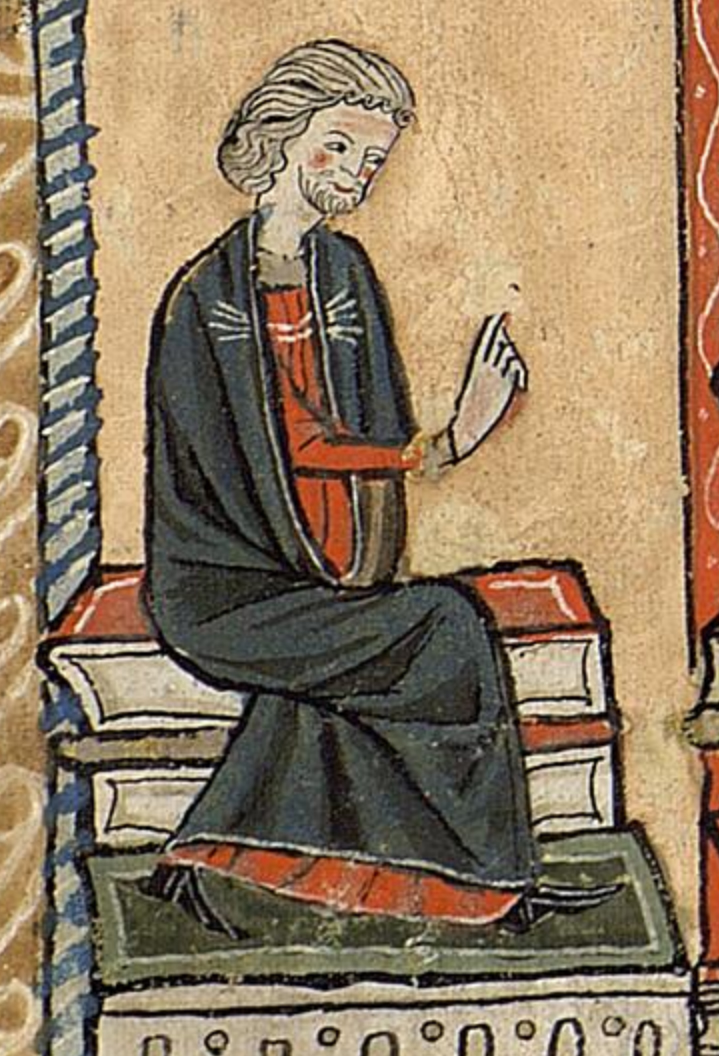
Count Bermudo Perez de Traba.

Theresa of Leon, ex-countess and regent of the County of Portugal, died in 1130, so all opposition to Afonso Henriques (loyal to Theresa) was eliminated from the county. A truce was thus established between the Portuguese and Leonese. In 1131 Fernando Pérez de Traba was in Portugal to attend the funeral of his lover in the Cathedral of Braga, in the presence of the Bishop of Porto, Paio Mendes, his former rival, the Count of Celanova, the Archdeacon Telo and some other nobles and clerics even donated to the Cathedral of Coimbra a property in São Pedro do Sul, which had previously belonged to it and was given to it by Theresa and delimited by Afonso Henriques.

Fernando Pérez was the brother of the lord of Viseu and Seia, Bermudo Pérez de Traba, who had been married to a sister of Afonso Henriques since the time of Theresa. From the castle of Seia, on the slopes of the Serra da Estrela, he decided to help his brother against the young prince. The duke tried to start a rebellion among the nobles who were unfaithful to Afonso, but he reacted quickly and went with his host to Seia, from there expelling both Bermudo and Fernando Pérez de Traba from the territory. Both then joined the service of Alfonso VII and would later fight against Afonso. However, as late as October 1131, Bermudo Pérez went to the court of Afonso Henríquez, which shows that the relations between the two were not as affected as it might seem.

=== Second Campaign of Galicia (1132) ===
The war resumed in 1132 and it was not until 1135 that new Portuguese campaigns in Galicia ceased. The Portuguese entered through the northern region of Limia. However, there they were defeated by the soldiers of Rodrigo Vélaz and Fernando Pérez de Traba, and were forced to return to Portugal.

When Alfonso VII was preparing to launch a counteroffensive against the Portuguese forces however, a revolt broke out in his domains led by Count Gonzalo Peláez, who was defeated and imprisoned in the castle of Aguiar. From there he fled and took refuge in Portugal, where he was welcomed by Afonso, who gave him several lands.

=== Third Campaign of Galicia (1133) ===
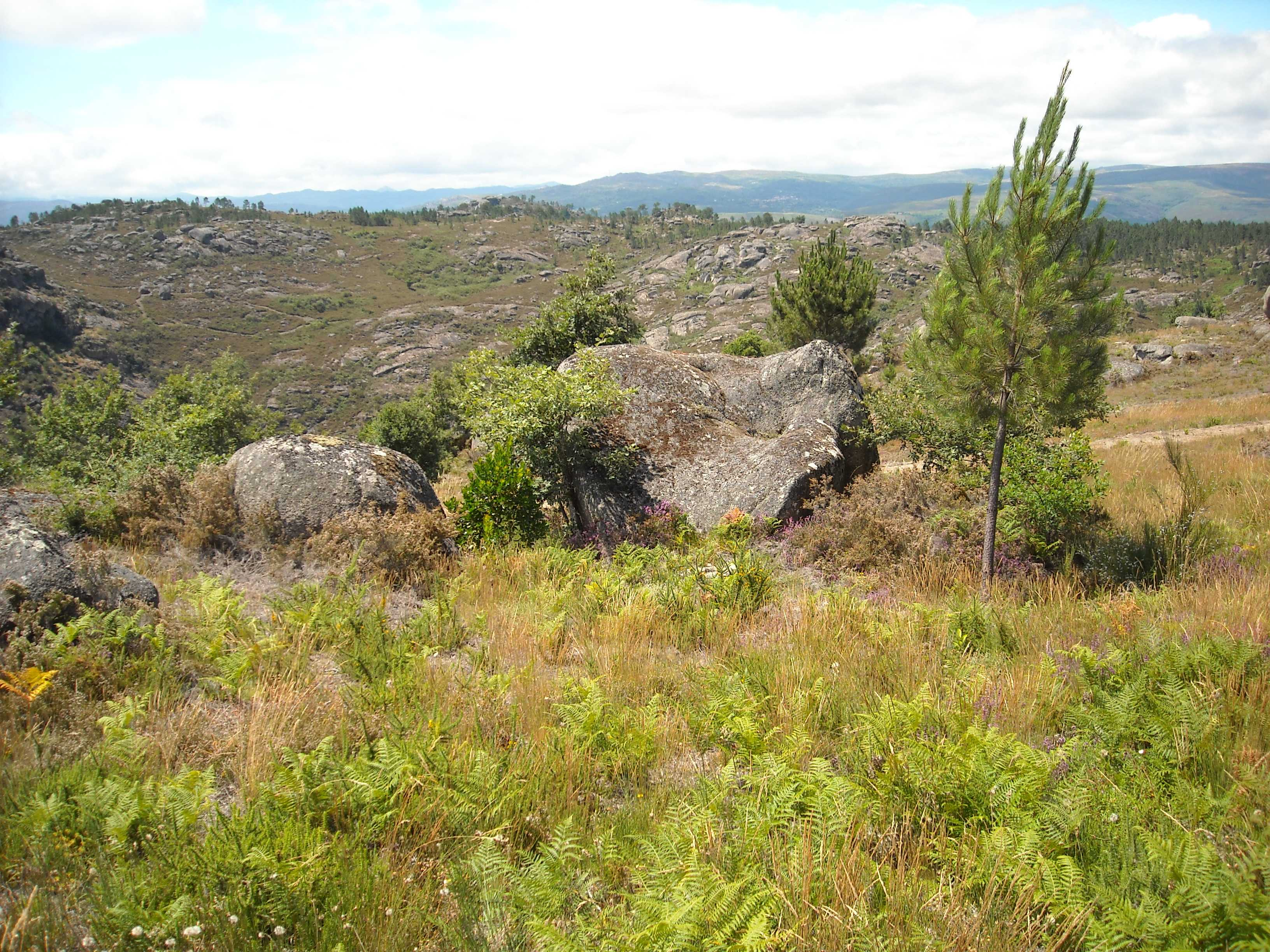
Terrain of Limia in Galicia.

Afonso Henriques did not give up his intentions regarding Galicia. In 1133 he crossed the Minho again and took control of the region of Límia, in whose castles he placed new castellans and also built a new castle in Celmes, from which he left well garrisoned with men and supplies, then returning to Portugal. The castle, however, was quickly attacked by Alfonso VII and taken before reinforcements from Portugal could arrive. Its occupants were imprisoned, and the region of Limia was thus lost. An "intolerable sadness" befell the Portuguese Court, according to the Chronicle of Alfonso VII.

Alfonso VII then retired from Limia to deal with important political issues, since Alfonso I of Aragon had died and Alfonso VII adopted the high title of Imperator totius Hispaniae (Emperor of All Spain) on July 4, 1135, in the Cortes meeting in Leon. The ceremony included the new King of Aragon Ramiro II, the King of Pamplona García Ramírez, Count Ramon Berenguer IV of Barcelona, and others but not Afonso Henriques, a bold omission that revealed his repudiation of his cousin's authority. He had instead headed south to build the castle of Leiria in December, a vanguard for Coimbra and which was supposed to help protect the kingdom from Muslim attacks coming from Santarém, as well as to threaten Muslim territory.

=== Alliance with Navarre. Fourth Campaign of Galicia (1137) ===
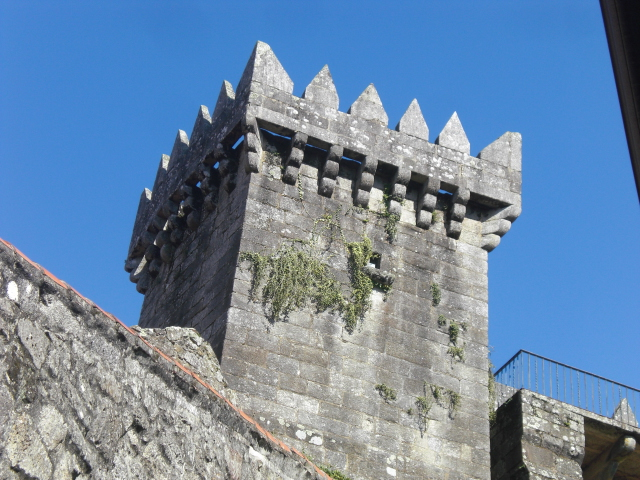
Medieval tower at Tui.

After losing Celmes, Afonso Henriques dedicated himself to recruiting men, granting lands, issuing town charters, restoring of churches and monasteries and administrating justice. He made no incursions against Leon but headed south against and captured Ourém, in order to reinforce the frontier. He also granted asylum to dissenting Leonese nobles, such as Gonçalo de Pelaiz.

In 1137, the King of Navarre died and was succeeded on the throne by Garcia Ramírez, who refused to pay allegiance to Alfonso VII and so war broke out between the two. Afonso took the opportunity to establish an alliance with Garcia and thus invaded Galicia once again. Upon entering Galicia, Afonso's army was joined by numerous Galician nobles attached to Portugal. The Count of Tuy Gómez Nuñez de Pombeiro and the Count of Límia Rodrigo Pérez de Traba were supporters of Afonso Henriques and sided with him, but the castellan of Allariz Fernando Anes vigorously defended his castle. Alfonso VII on his part was not alone, as he allied with Ramon Berenguer IV.

Afonso returned briefly to Portugal to reinforce his army and then, heading towards the Sil River, the Count of Sarria Rodrigo Vélaz and Fernando Pérez de Traba faced him with their hosts but both were defeated at the Battle of Cerneja.

Galicia was now open to Portuguese forces but then Afonso received alarming news from the south: threatened by the attacks of castellan Paio Guterres at Leiria, the Muslims commanded by Esmar were preparing to attack that castle. He therefore withdrew from Galicia to protect his southern border but was unable to prevent Leiria from being razed by the Muslims and more than 250 men killed. The castellan Paio Guterres avoided the massacre. A Portuguese detachment was also routed by the banks of the Nabão river.

Informed of the defeat of his vassals at Cerneja, Alfonso quickly went personally to Galicia with a small army after negotiating peace with the King of Navarre, and reconquered Tuy, Toroño and Límia. He subsequently summoned the Galician nobles and the Archbishop of Santiago de Compostela to gather their forces and join him on a large-scale military expedition into Portugal. Yet the Galicians nobles avoided doing so.

Strongly threatened both from the south and from the north, Afonso Henriques then went to Tuy accompanied by the archbishop of Braga and the bishop of Porto to propose peace to his cousin, the latter accompanied by the bishops of Segovia, Tuy and Ourense. Finally, Alfonso VII decided to accept the peace proposal of his cousin Afonso Henriques. This peace treaty was named the Treaty of Tuy. However, Afonso Henriques would ignore its terms.

== Aftermath ==
Alfonso VII sacked the count of Limia Rodrigo Peres Veloso and the count of Turonio Gomes Nunes for supporting Afonso Henriques. Rodrigo Peres Veloso was later pardoned while Gomes Nunes went into exhile north of the Pyrenees and became a cluniac monk.

The peace did not last long: Afonso invaded Galicia again just two years later, in 1139. He attacked through Tuy and entered Toroño. Alfonso VII responded by invading Portugal and heading to the Vez with a Galician army. Both leaders met at the castle of Penha da Rainha. According to the Chronicle of the Goths, Afonso won and captured the brother of the Leonese monarch, Bermudo Pérez de Traba and other supporters of Alfonso VII. But, according to the Chronica Adefonsi Imperatoris, the Kingdom of Leon won the battle and the Portuguese were the ones who asked for peace. Whatever the case, both exchanged prisoners and returned to peace.

This solved the problem of Portuguese independence for a very short time, as Afonso proclaimed himself king of Portugal after winning the battle of Ourique against the Almoravids in the same year. Alfonso VII recognized him as king in 1143 by the signing of the Treaty of Zamora, under the condition that he would remain a vassal of the emperor. However, it was not until 1179 that Pope Alexander III recognized him as an independent king, accepting his vassalage.

== Bibliography ==
- Livermore, H.V. (30 December 1976). A History Of Portugal. Cambridge University Press. ISBN 978-0521291033.
- Mattoso, José (1997). História de Portugal (in Portuguese). Vol. I. Editorial Verbo.
- Selvagem, Carlos (1931). Portugal Militar - Compêndio de História Militar e Naval de Portugal (in Portuguese). Lisboa: Imprensa Nacional.
- Veríssimo Serrão, Joaquim. Historia de Portugal.
- Reilly, Bernard F. (3 June 1993). The Medieval Spains. Cambridge University Press. ISBN 978-0-521-39741-4.
- Livermore, H. V. (2004). Portugal: A Traveller's History. Boydell Press. ISBN 978-1-84383-063-4.
- Lucas, Ann (30 September 2003). The Presence of the Past in Children's Literature. Bloomsbury Publishing USA. ISBN 978-0-313-05253-8.
- Stephens, H. Morse (2020-08-13). The Story of the Nations: Portugal. BoD – Books on Demand. ISBN 978-3-7524-2952-7.
- Fitz, Francisco García; Monteiro, João Gouveia (30 April 2018). War in the Iberian Peninsula, 700–1600. Routledge. ISBN 978-1-351-77886-2.
- Vicetto, Benito (1872). Historia de Galicia (in Spanish). Alvarellos. ISBN 978-84-85311-16-3.
- Fulgosio, Fernando (1867). Crónica de la provincia de Pontevedra (in Spanish).
- Actes del I Conceyu Internacional de Lliteratura Asturiana: Uviéu, 5, 6, 7 y 8 de payares 2001 (in Asturian). Academia Llingua Asturiana. 2003. ISBN 978-84-8168-343-1.
- Moxó, Salvador de; Quesada, Miguel Angel Ladero (1984). La España de los cincos reinos (1085-1369). Rialp. ISBN 978-84-321-2099-2.
- Pueyo, José Angel Lema (1997). Instituciones políticas del reinado de Alfonso I "el Batallador", rey de Aragón y Pamplona (1104-1134). University of the Basque Country. ISBN 9788475859224.
- Picón, Pelayo Vizuete (1887). Diccionario enciclopedico hispano-americano de literatura, ciencias y artes: Edicion profusamente ilustrada con miles de pequeños grabados intercalados en el texto y tirados aparte, que reproducen las diferentes especies de los reinos animal, vegetal y mineral. Montaner y Simón.
- Garrido, Manuel Rodríguez (17 January 2022). La Peza Su Historia in Vestigada Con el Carbonero Alcalde- 1859.
- Fletcher, Richard; Barton, Simon (2000). The World of el Cid: Chronicles of the Spanish Reconquest. Manchester University Press. ISBN 978-0-7190-5226-2.
- Reilly, Bernard F. (11 November 2016). The Kingdom of León-Castilla Under King Alfonso VII, 1126-1157. University of Pennsylvania Press. ISBN 978-1-5128-0612-0.
- McMurdo, Edward (1888). The History of Portugal: From the Commencement of the Monarchy to the Reign of Alfonso III. S. Low, Marston, Searle, & Rivington.
- Portugal 1964. Diario de Lisbõa. 1964.
- Bilbao, Fernando Suárez; Gutiérrez, Andrés Gambra; Jiménez, Manuel González; Planas, Javier Alvarado; Marroquín, Armando Besga; Manso, Gonzalo Oliva; Sacristán, Teresa Martialay; Albi, Irene Ruiz; Diez, Gonzalo Martínez; Amran, Rica; Gallegos, Federico; Rodríguez, Ignacio Ruiz (20 December 2010). Alfonso VI: Imperator totius orbis Hispanie. Editorial Sanz Y Torres S.l. ISBN 978-84-92948-45-1.
- Fox-Hindley, Dian (8 January 2019). Hercules and the King of Portugal: Icons of Masculinity and Nation in Calderón's Spain. U of Nebraska Press. ISBN 978-1-4962-1217-7.
- Livermore, H. V. (1947). A History of Portugal. University Press.
