= Treaty of Zamora =

1143 recognition of Portugal's independence from León

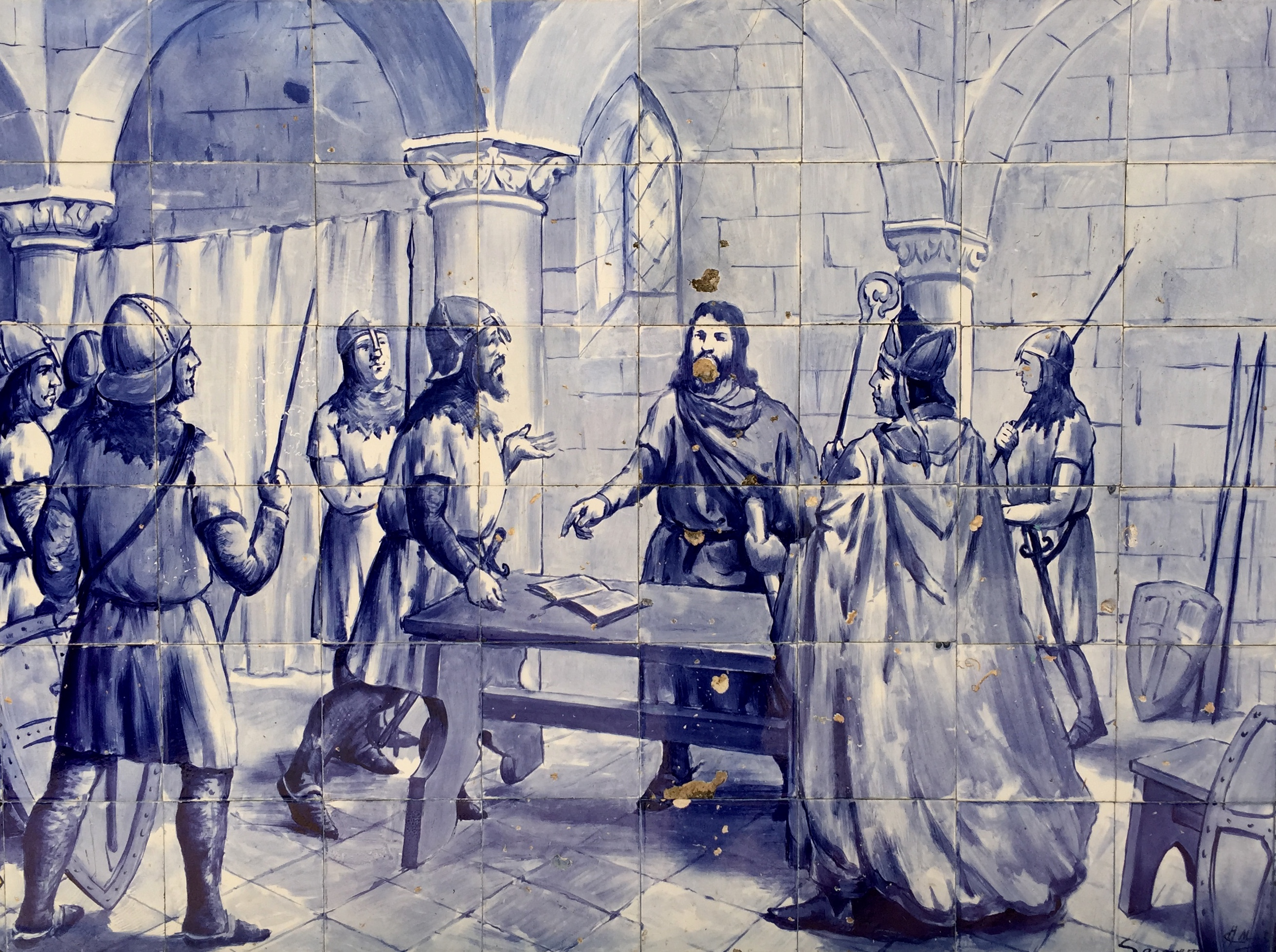
The signing of the Treaty of Zamora, depicted on an azulejo tile panel on the Jardim 1.º de Dezembro park in Portimão, Portugal.

The Treaty of Zamora (Portuguese: Tratado de Zamora) was signed on 5 October 1143 between King Afonso I of Portugal and his cousin Alfonso VII of León. It took place at Zamora in the presence of the papal legate, Cardinal Guido de Vico. On the occasion, Alfonso VII acknowledged Afonso as king of Portugal.

The event is celebrated as a critical step in the process which led to the complete recognition of Portugal as fully independent and which was only definitively concluded by the signing of the Papal bull Manifestis Probatum in 1179.

== Background ==
Following his victory at the Battle of São Mamede Afonso Henriques secured control of the County of Portugal. Yet he refused to employ the title of "count", which would imply subordination to Alfonso VII of León, but instead used the more ambiguous titles of infante or príncipe, implying royal descent, perhaps in the expectation of a royal inheritance. He realized that his authority derived from Alfonso VII. In 1135 however, Alfonso VII crowned himself Emperor of Spain and was paid homage by all the major rulers of the peninsula in person, including king Ramiro II of Aragon, king Garcia Ramirez of Navarre, count Ramon Berenguer IV of Barcelona, count Alfonso Jordan of Toulose, count William VII of Montpellier, and Abdul Malik, deposed lord of Zaragoza, but not Afonso Henriques. Furthermore, he persistently failed to appear at the Court of León and did not send troops to aid Alfonso VII, an attitude which he maintained for two years with impunity. He then signed an alliance with king Garcia of Navarre for a joint attack on León and fulfilled his part of the agreement by marching on Galicia, seizing the border territories of Tuy and Turonio and defeating an army loyal to Alfonso VII at the Battle of Cerneja.

Afonso proclaimed himself King of Portugal at the Battle of Ourique in 1139. He was not crowned, but instead raised atop his shield in old Germanic fashion and hailed as king by his troops. Hostilities between Portugal and León sparked shortly afterwards and Alfonso VII launched a military incursion into Portuguese territory, which culminated in the Battle of Arcos de Valdevez in 1141. Though only a minor encounter, the engagement was favourable towards the Portuguese and a number of very high ranking Leonese nobles were captured.

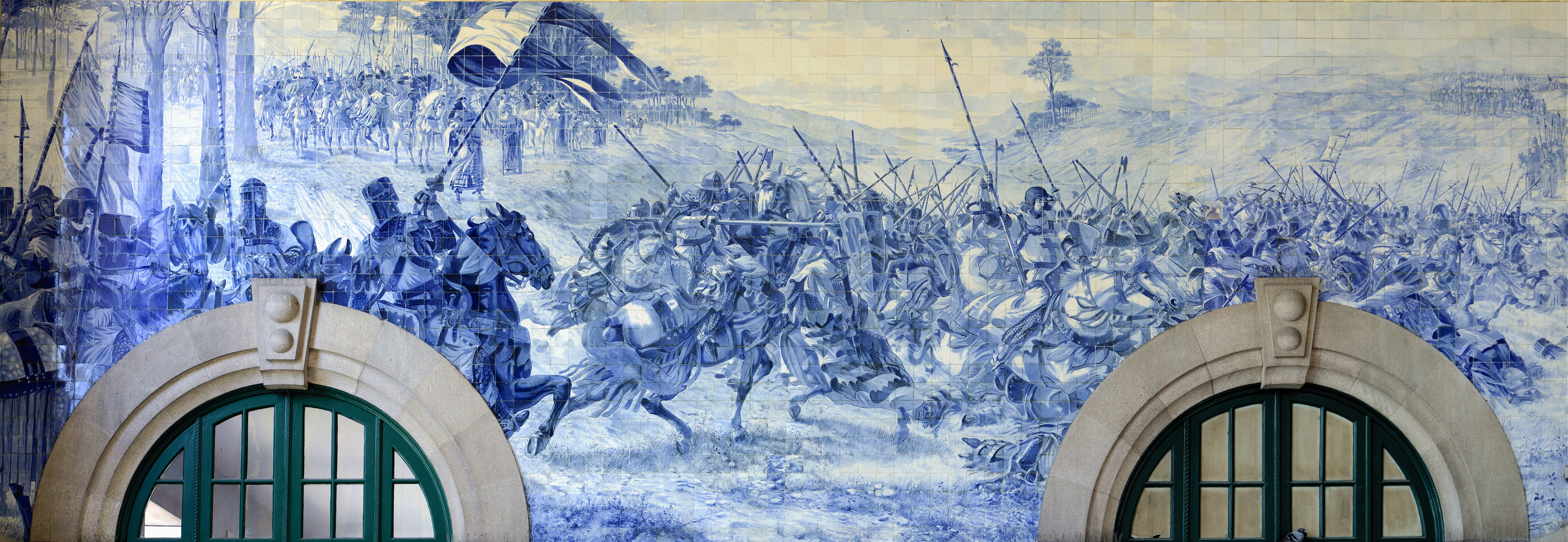
The Battle of Arcos de Valdevez, depicted by Jorge Colaço.

In order to avoid further conflict, Alfonso VII sought diplomatic negotiations and he sent messengers requesting the Archbishop of Braga João Peculiar to mediate. Afonso Henriques and Alfonso VII had a friendly meeting, peace was discussed and they agreed to suspend hostilities for some years. The prisoners taken on both sides were restituted and furthemore some of the highest officers from both armies were appointed as sureties until a definite treaty could be signed. The truce achieved at Valdevez was a preliminary to a definitive peace treaty between Portugal and León. After coming to the control of Portugal, Afonso had originally signed as infante (thereby avoiding the clearly subordinate title of "count") and predominantly as "prince" at least since 1136, but after the truce of Valdevez he definitely employed the style "king".

Between the truce of Valdevez and the signing of the Treaty of Zamora, Alfonso VII renewed the war against Navarre while Afonso attempted to siege Lisbon in 1142, which was unsuccessful. On the spring of 1143, Alfonso VII led another campaign, this time towards al-Andalus, ruled by the Almoravids. Taking advantage of the internal difficulties of the Almoravids, Alfonso VII devastated the regions of Carmona, Córdoba and Seville, but after the death in combat of his notable general Munio Alfonso, the Leonese monarch decided to discontinue any further campaigning until the following year. He would address the signing of a definite treaty and peace with Afonso Henriques in the meantime.

The Archbishop of Braga played a critical role in the diplomatic effort in the two years leading up to Zamora. At that time, Pope Innocent II had sent Cardinal Guido de Vico to the Iberian Peninsula as his delegate to summon a Provincial Council at Valladolid and promulgate the resolution of the Second Council of the Lateran, while some other provisions were also made in relation to the Church in Iberia on the occasion. Guido de Vico had already negotiated with João Peculiar once in 1135. João Peculiar succeeded in securing the participation of both monarchs and the papal legate Guido de Vico, seeking to mediate a compromise. He accompanied the legate to Coimbra and from there to Zamora.

== Proceedings ==
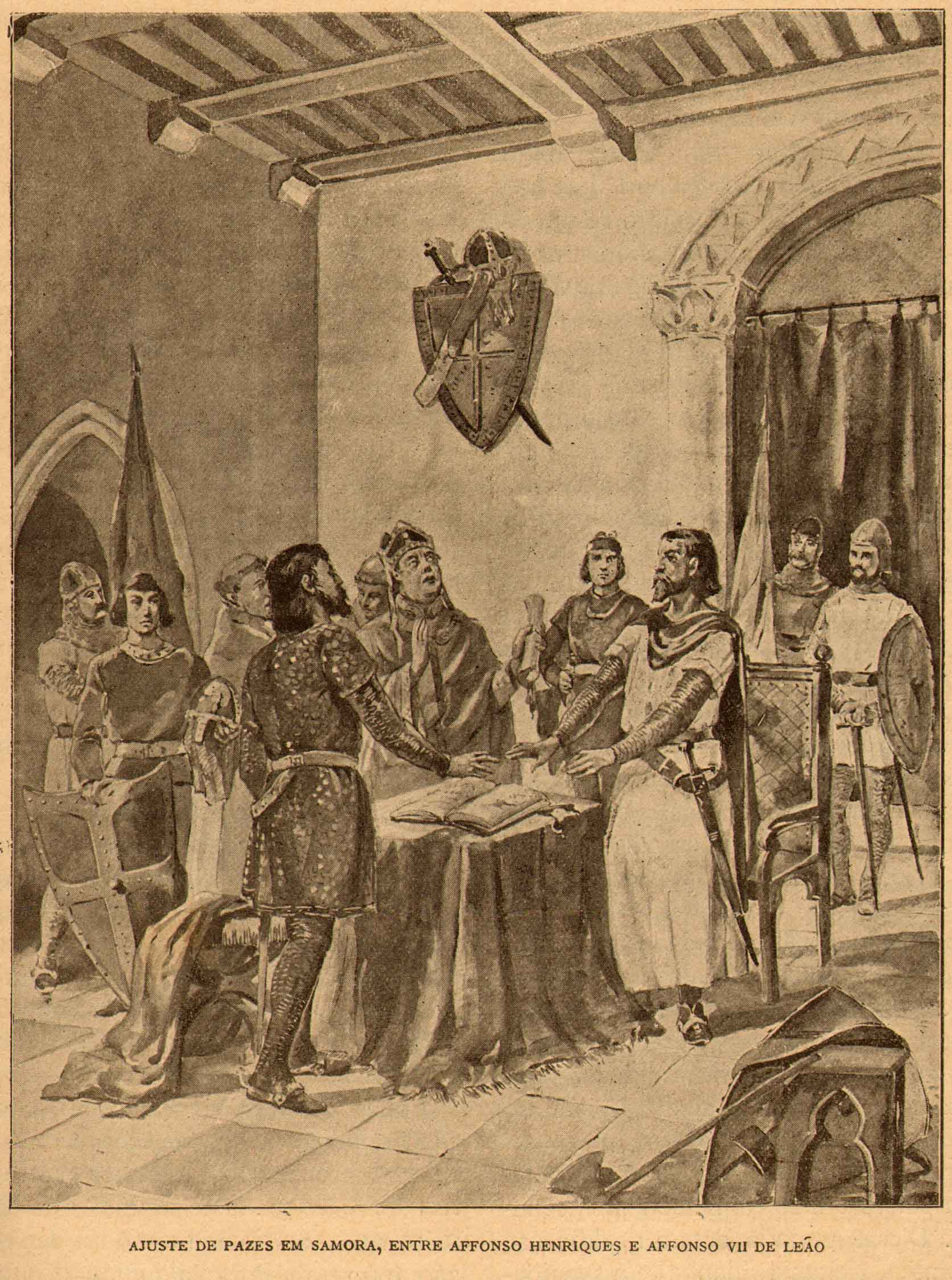
Illustration of the treaty signing (Alfredo Roque Gameiro, 1899)

Afonso Henriques and Alfonso VII convened at Zamora between 4 and 5 October 1143. The two cousins concluded the proceedings amicably. The text itself has since been lost however, and no exact record of the conditions agreed upon has survived to the present.

While the exact details are now lost, both kings are known to have pledged mutual peace. Further details of the agreement may only be inferred indirectly. Afonso Henriques was acknowledged as king, while apparently maintaining prior clauses of military aid due to Alfonso VII. As Emperor of Spain, Alfonso VII would not have found Afonsos claim to a royal title problematic, and he could argue that the more kings he counted as his vassals, the greater his prestige.

Afonso is likely to have agreed not to encroach eastwards into León and to focus his attention on al-Andalus. If so, the concession was important as the borders between León and Portugal were ill-defined and the counts of Portugal had long standing claims within Galicia, which both count Henry and his wife Teresa had previously sought to secure and expand. Alfonso VII appears to have sought to bind Afonso Henriques to him as a vassal by granting him the lordship of Astorga, and thereby maintain a technical superiority.

After the signing of the treaty, Afonso returned to Portugal and left his second-in-command Fernando Captivo behind as governor of Astorga.

== Consequences ==
The treaty of 1143 eased border tensions between Portugal and Leon until 1157. Afonso Henriques styled himself "rex Portugallensis" and this usage was accepted without formal protest by Alfonso VII. Nevertheless, Alfonso VII did not issue any explicit recognition of Portuguese sovereignty. If Afonso was recognized as king of Portugal in return for the tenure of Astorga and consequent technical vassalage, the dependency was only nominal.

The matter of Papal recognition remained after the signing of the treaty. The presence of Cardinal Guido de Vico gave the event symbolic weight but not legal confirmation. Afonso Henriques had begun lobbying at Rome for papal recognition even before his meeting with Alfonso VII at Zamora. As early as 13 December 1143, Afonso Henriques wrote a letter of oblation to Pope Innocent II. He declared himself a liegeman of Saint Peter and vassal of the Pope, and offered to pay a yearly tribute of four ounces of gold in exchange for recognition and protection. The influential Archbishop of Braga João Peculiar is likely to have recommended this course of action. The Portuguese king declared that:

Knowing that the keys to the kingdom of Heaven were given to St. Peter by Our Lord Jesus Christ, I have decided to take that same apostle as my Patron and advocate, so that I may experience his help and counsel in the difficulties of the present life, and through his merits may attain the rewards of eternal blessedness. Therefore, I, Afonso, by the grace of God King of Portugal, have rendered homage to the Pope, my Lord and Father, into the hands of the Cardinal Deacon Dom Guido, Legate of the Apostolic See. I hereby constitute my land as a censual (feudal tribute) of St. Peter and of the Holy Church of Rome, with an annual tribute of four ounces of gold, and I decree that all those who, after my death, come to possess this land, shall annually pay the same tribute to St. Peter. As a true soldier of St. Peter and of the Roman Pontiff, I ought to have for myself and for my land—and in all that pertains to its dignity and honor—the defense and aid of the Apostolic See. And I shall never be obliged to admit into it the power or lordship of any ecclesiastical or secular authority, save that of the Holy See and its legates.

This letter of oblation and affirmation was drawn up on the Ides of December in the year 1181 of the Spanish Era [13 December 1143 AD].

I, Afonso, King of the Portuguese, who most willingly ordered this letter to be made, confirm it with my own hand. I, João, Archbishop of Braga, confirm it. I, Bernardo, Bishop of Coimbra, confirm it. I, Pedro, Bishop of Porto, confirm it.

Archbishop João Peculiar travelled to Rome and personally delivered the letter to the Pope in 1144. The Roman Curia's legal culture placed high value on written agreements and formal titles. Leonese ambassadors to Rome lobbied against Afonso Henriques by the Pope. While the papacy accepted the payment of tribute, it did not issue any formal acknowledgment of his royal status at that point. Alfonso VII was a favourite of the Vatican, which had granted him a Golden Rose and followed a policy of encouraging unity in Iberia in order to fight Islam more effectively. Innocent II had in the meantime died and been succeeded by Lucius II. In 1144 the new Pope accepted Afonsos tribute and repeated the offer of protection, but he referred to him as dux Portugalensium still, and Portugal only as a terra.

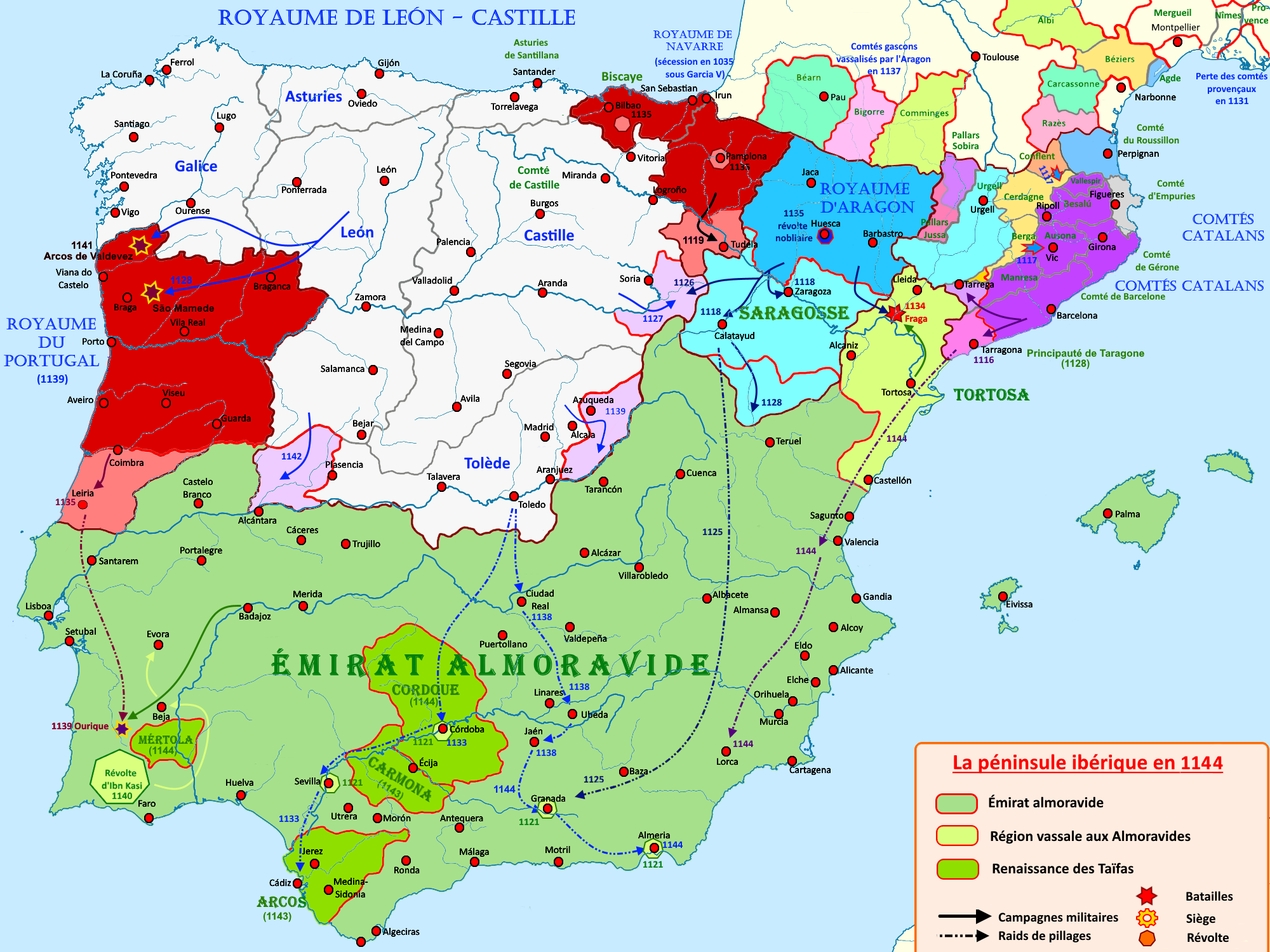
Iberia in 1144, with the new Kingdom of Portugal in red.

Although the question of Portuguese independence was not definitively settled, Zamora had important implications. The separation of Portugal was "an accomplished fact, whatever might be the nominal dependence under which the Prince remained under the Emperor, and no force of arms or treaties had been able to prevent this fact". The Church of León accepted the separation of Portugal and João Peculiar attended neither the council of Valladolid nor any subsequent council in neighbouring Iberian realms and continued to negotiate directly with Rome.

Subsequent Leonese lists of vassals of Alfonso VII included the king of Aragon and the king of Navarre, but not the king of Portugal. Afonso Henriques was not counted as a vassal of León in the 1147-1149 Leonese Chronica Adephonsi Imperatoris, nor is he considered to have ever explicitly submitted to Alfonso VII, unlike king Garcia Ramirez of Navarre. Though rivals, Alfonso VII and Afonso Henriques were noted for maintaining amicable relations. In the chronicle, Alfonso VII is not depicted as unable to bring Afonso Henriques to heel by force of arms, but as a wise ruler who magnanimously granted him independence out of respect for the wishes of the grandfather of both, Alfonso VI. Later in 1154, Alfonso confirmed the division of the city of Tui between its bishop and chapter with the consent of Afonso Henriques, in whose territory part of the ecclesiastical properties of Tui lied.

After the death of Alfonso VII in 1157, his Crown was divided between his two sons Ferdinand II of León and Sancho III of Castile, and the title of "emperor" was dropped. Yet Ferdinand II still tried to reassert suzerainty over Afonso Henriques and a war between the two followed, but by 1166 he had agreed to definitively abandon any claims of overlordship over Portugal. Afonso Henriques continued to rule as independent king in practice and addressing the pope directly, declaring himself a vassal and offering tribute. The tribute offered was also raised from four ounces to sixteen ounces or two marks. These efforts culminated in the issuance of the papal bull Manifestis Probatum by Pope Alexander III in 1179, which definitively recognized Portugal as an independent state and Afonso Henriques as its king.

== Legacy ==
While 5 October is commemorated by Portuguese monarchists as the symbolic birth of the kingdom, the date also marks the establishment of the Portuguese Republic in 1910 and is recognized today as a national holiday for that reason.

== See also ==
- History of Portugal
- List of treaties
- Timeline of Portuguese history
- Portugal in the Middle Ages
