= 1127 =

1127 in various calendars
- Gregorian calendar: 1127; MCXXVII
- Ab urbe condita: 1880
- Armenian calendar: 576; ԹՎ ՇՀԶ
- Assyrian calendar: 5877
- Balinese saka calendar: 1048–1049
- Bengali calendar: 533–534
- Berber calendar: 2077
- English Regnal year: 27 Hen. 1 – 28 Hen. 1
- Buddhist calendar: 1671
- Burmese calendar: 489
- Byzantine calendar: 6635–6636
- Chinese calendar: 丙午年 (Fire Horse); 3824 or 3617 — to — 丁未年 (Fire Goat); 3825 or 3618
- Coptic calendar: 843–844
- Discordian calendar: 2293
- Ethiopian calendar: 1119–1120
- Hebrew calendar: 4887–4888
- Hindu calendars
- Vikram Samvat: 1183–1184
- Shaka Samvat: 1048–1049
- Kali Yuga: 4227–4228
- Holocene calendar: 11127
- Igbo calendar: 127–128
- Iranian calendar: 505–506
- Islamic calendar: 520–521
- Japanese calendar: Daiji 2 (大治２年)
- Javanese calendar: 1032–1033
- Julian calendar: 1127; MCXXVII
- Korean calendar: 3460
- Minguo calendar: 785 before ROC 民前785年
- Nanakshahi calendar: −341
- Seleucid era: 1438/1439 AG
- Thai solar calendar: 1669–1670
- Tibetan calendar: མེ་ཕོ་རྟ་ལོ་ (male Fire-Horse); 1253 or 872 or 100 — to — མེ་མོ་ལུག་ལོ་ (female Fire-Sheep); 1254 or 873 or 101

Emperor Gaozong of Song (1107–1187) rules from 1127

Year 1127 (MCXXVII) was a common year starting on Saturday of the Julian calendar.

== Events ==
=== By place ===
==== Europe ====
- March 2 – Charles the Good, count of Flanders, is murdered by a band of knights while praying in church; he leaves no children. King Louis VI of France appoints William Clito (son of Robert Curthose) as new ruler. But the Flemish towns of Bruges, Ghent, Saint-Omer and Ypres recognize (with English financial support) Thierry of Alsace as rival count.
- Spring – The forces of Alfonso VII of León and Castile begin the Siege of Guimarães, which will end in their withdrawal.
- Summer – King Roger II of Sicily claims the Hauteville possessions in Italy as well the overlordship of Capua. However, a coalition of Norman noblemen in Apulia and Calabria resist (supported by Pope Honorius II) against Sicilian rule. The same year, Roger regains control over Malta after a rebellion. Roger II also establishes a pact with the maritime Republic of Savona to guarantee the security of the Mediterranean Sea, probably following an Almoravid raid against the Sicilian realm.
- December 18 – Conrad III (with support of the imperial cities, Swabia and Austria) is elected and crowned as anti-king of Germany at Nuremberg.

==== England ====
- King Henry I of England arranges the marriage of his daughter Matilda (the widow of Emperor Henry V) to the 14-year-old Geoffrey of Anjou (son of Count Fulk V). This is done to ensure an alliance between England and Anjou, and to prevent Fulk allying with Louis VI. Henry has the English nobles swear allegiance to Matilda as the rightful heir to the throne. Upon his death, her cousin Stephen of Blois crosses the channel and usurps her throne, becoming the King of England. She wages a lengthy civil war known as the Anarchy, which lasts from 1135–1154.

==== Levant ====
- Imad ad-Din Zengi, a Turkish military leader, becomes governor (atabeg) of Mosul. He seizes the cities of Nisibin, Sinjar and Harran in the Jazira Region (Northern Mesopotamia).

==== Asia ====
- January 9 – Jin–Song Wars: Jurchen forces sack the Chinese capital of Kaifeng of the Northern Song dynasty during the Jingkang incident. They capture Emperor Qinzong, along with his father, Huizong, and members of the House of Zhao.
- June 12 – Qinzong's younger brother, the 20-year-old Gaozong, re-establishes the Song dynasty (as the Southern Song dynasty) in Lin'an (modern-day Hangzhou) and is proclaimed emperor.

=== By topic ===
==== Religion ====
- The Kalyan minaret (as part of the Po-i-Kalyan mosque complex) is completed in Bukhara (modern Uzbekistan).

== Births ==
- April 16 – Felix of Valois, French nobleman and hermit (d. 1212)
- May 23 – Uijong, Korean ruler of Goryeo (d. 1173)
- July 23 – Zhao Fu, emperor of the Song dynasty (d. 1129)
- October 18 – Go-Shirakawa, Japanese emperor (d. 1192)
- October 29 – Yang Wanli, Chinese politician and poet (d. 1206)
- November 27 – Emperor Xiaozong of Song, Chinese emperor (d. 1194)
- December – Henry I ("the Liberal"), count of Champagne (d. 1181)
- Bolesław I the Tall, duke of Wrocław (d. 1201)
- Approximate date – Julian of Cuenca, Spanish bishop

== Deaths ==
- February 7 – Ava (von Göttweig), German poet (b. 1060)
- February 10 – William IX ("the Troubador"), duke of Aquitaine (b. 1071)
- March 2 – Charles the Good, count of Flanders (b. 1084)
- March 23 – Ottone Frangipane, Italian Benedictine monk and saint (b. 1040)
- May 16 – Gens du Beaucet, French hermit and saint (b. 1104)
- July – William II, Norman duke of Apulia and Calabria (b. 1095)
- August 12 – Jordan of Ariano, Norman warrior and nobleman
- September 1 – Prince Álmos (or Almus), duke of Hungary and Croatia
- October 1 – Morphia of Melitene, queen consort of Jerusalem (or 1126)
- November 1 – Zhang Bangchang, ruler of Da Chu (b. 1081)
- November 12 – Godbald (or Godebald), bishop of Utrecht
- November 25 – Minamoto no Yoshimitsu, Japanese samurai (b. 1045)
- December 19 – Jordan II (or Giordano), prince of Capua
- Fujiwara no Hiroko, Japanese empress consort (b. 1036)
- Gilla Críst Ua Máel Eóin, Irish historian and abbot
- Gualfardo of Verona, Italian trader and hermit (b. 1070)
- William III ("the Child"), count of Burgundy (b. 1110)
- Zhu, Chinese empress of the Song dynasty (b. 1102)
