= Battle of São Mamede =

1128 battle establishing Afonso Henriques' control of the County of Portugal

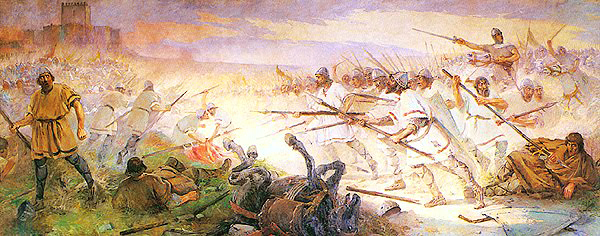
- The first Portuguese afternoon (1922) by Acácio Lino
Date	24 June 1128
Location	Guimarães, County of Portugal
Result	Afonso Henriques' victory

Belligerents
County of Portugal loyal to Afonso Henriques	County of Portugal loyal to Theresa, Countess of Portugal

Commanders and leaders
Afonso Henriques	Theresa, Countess of Portugal; Fernando Pérez de Traba

The Battle of São Mamede (Portuguese: Batalha de São Mamede) took place on 24 June 1128 near Guimarães and is considered an important event in the process that led to the establishment of Portugal as an independent kingdom.

Forces led by Afonso Henriques defeated forces led by his mother, Theresa of Portugal, and Fernão Peres de Trava. Though he took control of the County of Portugal, he remained a vassal of King Alfonso VII of León and Castile, who was nominally the overlord of the county.

Following the battle, Afonso Henriques consolidated his control over the County of Portugal. He later adopted the title of King of Portugal, following his victory at the Battle of Ourique in 1139, and his royal title was recognized by Alfonso VII of León and Castile in the Treaty of Zamora in 1143.

== History ==
After the Battle of Sagrajas and following an appeal by king Alfonso VI of León, Henry of Portugal, a brother of the Duke of Burgundy, travelled to Iberia to take part in the Reconquista. He fought in the service of León and in honour of this the King granted him the County of Portugal in 1096. This came with a reinstated title; because of attempts by the previous holder some years earlier to assert independence, it had been suppressed. Henry thus became count of Portugal and married Theresa, one of Alfonso's daughters.

From the early years of his rule, Henry became influenced by the desire of the lords of the county for greater autonomy.

Henry died in 1112, and his wife Theresa became the regent of Portugal. Her sister Urraca became Queen of León after the death of her father, Alfonso VI of Leon. Like her husband, Theresa was ambitious and also wished for independence from Leon, and particularly from her sister. In an attempt to increase her autonomy and power, at different times she allied herself to her sister's enemies or with her sister, whichever was most propitious at the time. After the siege of Coimbra in 1117, Theresa began signing as "queen". This was meant to reinforce her own position and counter the authority of her sister Urraca. Though the validity of her claim was never definitively established, it was also never definitively refuted either. Yet Theresa could only rely on disunity within León to maintain it.

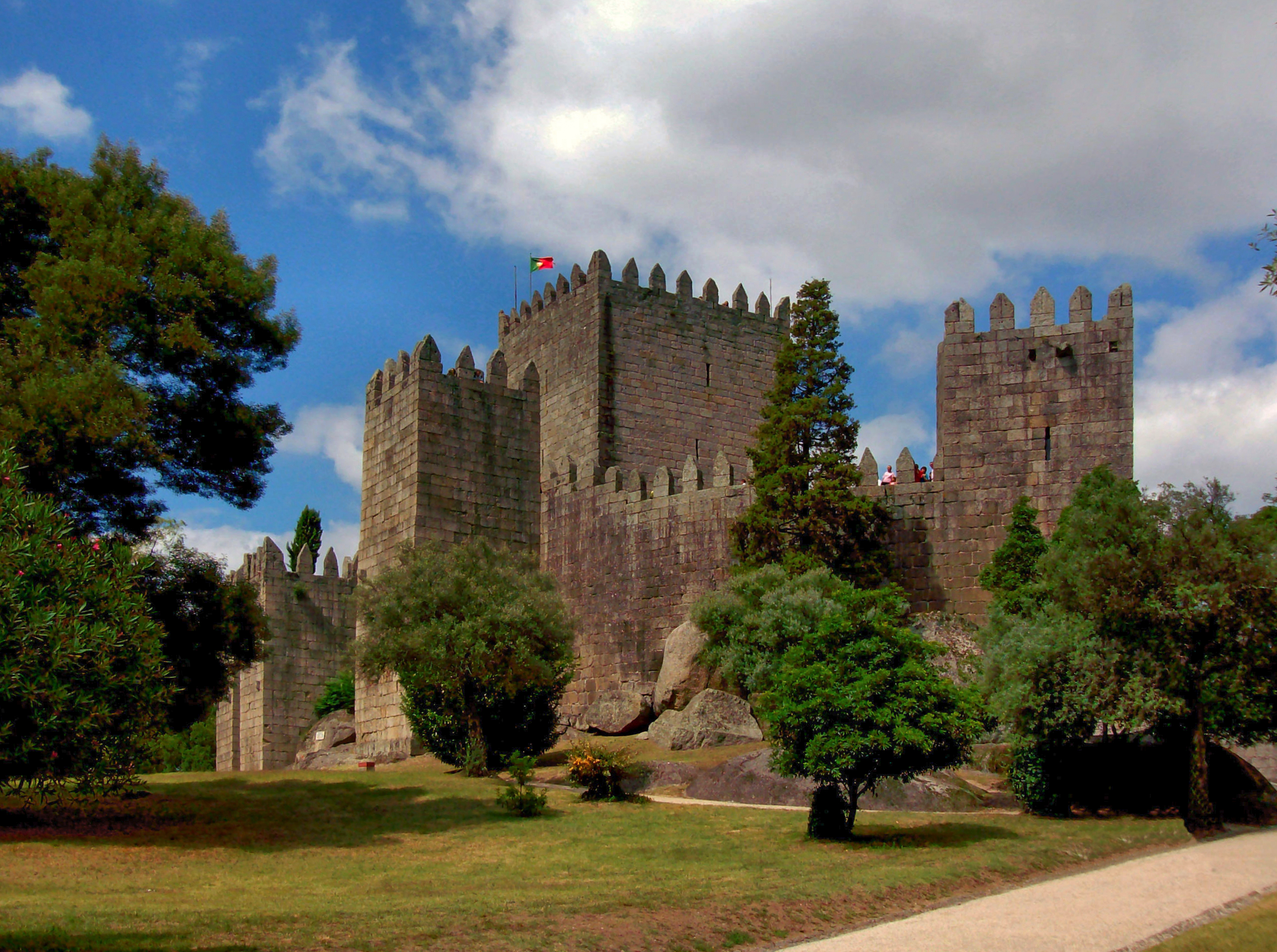
The castle of Guimarães, close to which the battle of São Mamede was struck.

Peace subsided after the siege until Theresa became involved in civil quarrels in neighbouring Galicia, which brought her into conflict with her sister. She became a close associate of Fernando Peres de Trava, who became influential in Portugal and by 1123 on equal standing as Theresa. Among other things, he granted castles, such as that of Benviver, together with Theresa. It is not clear whether the two officially married or not, but while Theresa called herself the spouse of Fernando Peres and Peres may divorced his first wife, clerical writers asserted that the relation was adulterous. The pair had a daughter.

Theresa's excessive commitment to the Galicians however compromised the unity of her possessions as her power diminished while that of Fernando Peres grew, and within a short time a group of disgruntled nobles had begun to gather around Theresas son, Afonso Henriques. Afonsos supporters initially included the Archbishop of Braga Paio Mendes, one of Theresas most implacable opponents; Soeiro Mendes de Sousa, Paio Soares da Maia, Fernando Mendes II de Bragança, the influential brothers Ermígio, Egas and Mendo Moniz of Ribadouro.

Afonso's initiation into public life began when he was taken by his tutor and guardian Egas Moniz to Zamora, to be armed a knight by his cousin and overlord Alfonso VII, at the cathedral of the city. This happened at the feast of Pentecost in 1125. After returning to Guimarães, many Portuguese nobles suggested that he should wrest control of the county from his mother. Other individuals joined his side following his arming ceremony, namely Nuno Pais de Azevedo and Paio Vasques de Bravães.

Urraca died in 1126. Urraca's son, Alfonso VII, became king of León and Castile and invaded Portugal in September of 1127 to force Theresa (and Afonso) to duly acknowledge him as overlord of the territory and submit. He was supported by the majority of the Galician aristocracy. Heavy fighting followed during the campaign and during the siege of Guimarães, Egas Moniz obtained the withdrawal of Alfonso VII through able negotiation, accepting to serve as surety for the loyalty of Afonso Henriques, his pupil. After obtaining nominal submission from both Theresa and Afonso, Alfonso left the country.

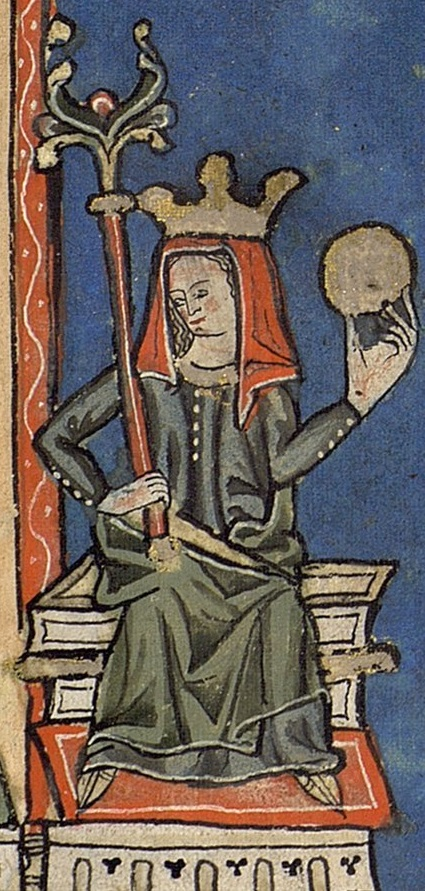
Theresa of Portugal.

The invasion lasted for six weeks and far-reaching consequences: Portugal was reduced to the status of province, territory north of the Minho was lost and Theresa and Peres were blamed. This increased the power of Theresa's son, Afonso Henriques. Theresa and Afonso therefore became enemies as both wanted to take control of the county, but only the supporters of Afonso were fundamentally interested in secession and total independence. Many who had tolerated Peres began seeing him as an obstacle to independence.

The estrangement between Afonso and Theresa was reflected in the charters of the county. As late as March 31 1128, Theresa and Afonso still jointly signed legal documents or charters. By April 27 1128 however, Afonso confirmed the charter of Guimarães with no reference to Theresa, whose authority was relegated south of the Douro. By May 26 he confirmed a prior privilege obtained by Archbishop Paio Mendes and promised to cede him the city of Braga once he entered into possession of Portugal.

The growing power of Afonso Henriques and his supporters was too plain to be ignored by Theresa and Fernando Peres. Shortly before the battle, they appeared in the district of Braga at the head of an army. They were met and defeated by the forces of Afonso Henriques close to Guimarães. Theresa and Fernando Peres were both captured but merely expelled from the territory.

== Aftermath ==
After Teresa and Fernando Peres were expelled, all of Portugal followed Afonso, though it appears some regional resistance was still put up between the end of 1128 and the first months of 1129. Alfonso VII could not see São Mamede with indifference, and his choices were to either reinstate Teresa by force of arms or force Afonso to acknowledge his authority. The state of constant civil strife within León or against the Crown of Aragon seems to have compelled him to the second option.

Though victorious at São Mamede, Afonso was initially obligated to submit as a vassal of León. An army entered Portugal on orders of Alfonso VII, but its troops were in no mood for military action and withdrew after making sure that Afonsos coup did not infringe on the sovereignty of the Emperor, who was still nominally the overlord of the territory.

Teresa lived only for another two years after the battle and died in Galicia. Fernando Peres entered the service of Alfonso VII as his general and would fight against Afonso in the future.

The Battle of São Mamede marked the beginning of a new phase in Portuguese history, as both Count Henry and Teresa had expended considerable energy pursuing ambitions outside the county, while Afonso Henriques focused on consolidating his authority within Portugal. Unlike his mother, Afonso established constructive relations with senior local members of the Catholic Church, namely the Archbishop of Braga, and repudiated the Archbishop of Santiago de Compostela, with whom his mother had associated with.

Reliant as Afonso had been on the support of the powerful noble houses of Entre-Douro-e-Minho, these had grown accustomed to the autonomy and local predominance that the distance from the Court of León afforded them, and presented a significant obstacle to Afonsos authority. This was highlighted in 1131 when Afonsos brother-in-law Bermudo Pérez rose in a revolt that attracted considerable local support and was not easily suppressed. The following year therefore, Afonso began an original policy of easing his dependency on his co-conspirators, by relocating his capital from Guimarães to Coimbra further to the south, closer to the frontier with al-Andalus. These were borderlands subject to persistent yearly attacks by Muslim raiding parties, and settled by experienced and independent-minded frontiersmen, whose lack of social status was made up with by ambition and resolve. The dangers of frontier life kept their skills honed and they increasingly began to fill the ranks in Afonsos army. They would play an increasingly important role in his future wars of consolidation and expansion.

When Egas Moniz realized that his pupil would not submit to León as he had assured in the siege of Guimarães, he travelled with his wife and children to Toledo to see the Alfonso VII in person, and presented himself barefooted and haltered, ready to surrender his life. The Emperor however released him in acknowledgement of the chivalrous act.

From 1128 to 1137 Afonso Henriques was at war with Alfonso VII. He probably desired the territorial expansion of his fief, based on promises or claims, more or less fictitious or fallacious, dating from the reign of Urraca. He was also clearly aiming for the title of king.

At the Battle of Ourique a few years later in 1139, Afonso declared himself King of Portugal. León finally recognized Portugal's independence in 1143 in the Treaty of Zamora. In 1179, the Holy See acknowledged him as king, de jure.

== Notable participants ==
Nobles who participated in the battle alongside Afonso Henriques:

- Afonso Nunes de Barbosa
- Paio Mendes da Maia
- Egas Moniz de Cresconhe
- Egas Moniz de Ribadouro
- Ermígio Moniz de Ribadouro
- Fernão Captivo
- Garcia Soares
- Godinho Fafes de Lanhoso
- Gonçalo Mendes da Maia
- Gonçalo Mendes de Sousa
- Nuno Soares Velho
- Paio Ramires Ramirão
- Sancho Nunes de Barbosa
- Soeiro Mendes de Sousa

== See also ==
- Luso-Leonese War (1130–1137)
- Battle of Cerneja
- Treaty of Zamora
- Portugal in the Middle Ages
- Portugal in the Reconquista
