= Knight-villein =

A knight-villein (Cavaleiro-vilão in Portuguese, caballero villano in Spanish) was a free plebeian horsemen who owned land, weapons and a horse, despite not being part of the nobility, being prominent in medieval Portugal, Castile and Leon.

Knights-villein provided military service directly to the king, and in exchange were entitled to the same set of privileges as minor nobles for doing so: among others, they did not pay scutage, and their testimony was considered proof in courts.

Commoners usually fought on foot, but if their property indicated a certain level of affluence they were obligated to own a horse and considered knights-villein, the highest class of free commoners, just below the nobility. The town charter of Penela reads: "all those that dwell here and have two yoke of oxen and ten sheep and two cows and a bed of cloth, he that has more, let him get also a horse". In medieval Portugal, two-thirds of knights-villein were obligated to partake for a set number of weeks in a fossado (raid) on Muslim territory, being entitled to a share of captured loot, but fined 15 soldos if they did not respond to the call to arms in case of foreign invasion.

They often organized raids on Muslim lands of their own initiative, and settled in or around the frontier towns in southern or eastern Portugal, giving them a military character. Between the capture of Coimbra in 1064 and the capture of Lisbon in 1147, the conquest of land from al-Andalus to Portugal was mostly undertaken by minor nobles and knights-villein from the towns or rural communities.

== See also ==
- Reconquista
- Kingdom of Portugal
- Portugal in the Middle Ages
- Military history of Portugal
- Kingdom of Castile
- Portugal in the Reconquista
- Villein
