= Battle of Ourique =

1139 battle of the Portuguese Reconquista

- Part of the Reconquista
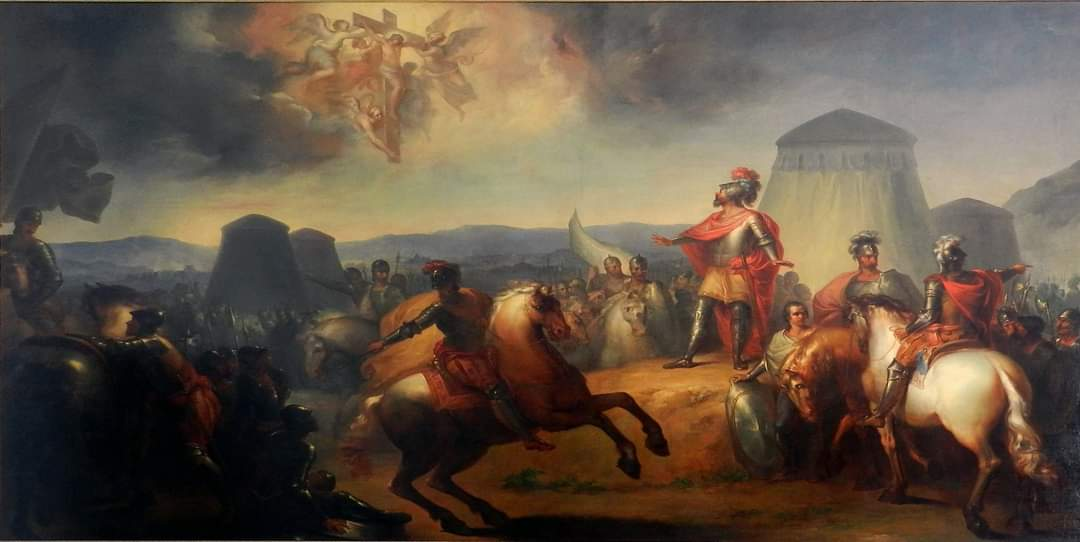
- The Miracle of Ourique, by Domingos Sequeira (1793)
| Date | 25 July 1139 |
| Location | Near Ourique, Portugal |
| Result | Portuguese victory |

Belligerents
| Kingdom of Portugal | Almoravid dynasty |

Commanders and leaders
| Afonso Henriques | Muhammad Az-Zubayr Ibn Umar |

Strength
| 2,400–3,000 | Unknown |

Casualties and losses
| Unknown | Unknown |

The Battle of Ourique (Portuguese: Batalha de Ourique; Arabic: معركة أوريكه) was fought on 25 July 1139, when Portuguese forces under Afonso Henriques defeated forces led by the Almoravid wāli (governor) of Córdoba, Muhammad Az-Zubayr Ibn Umar, who is identified as "King Ismar" in Christian chronicles.

The exact location of the battle remains uncertain and has been the subject of considerable debate. Nevertheless, the battle soon acquired major significance and became associated with Afonso Henriques's claim to the title of "king". It became his most celebrated victory over Muslim forces.

The battle has long been associated with the Miracle or legend of Ourique, according to which Christ Crucified appeared to Afonso Henriques on the night before the battle and revealed the coat of arms of Portugal. According to tradition, the arms were adopted after the battle, with the five escutcheons interpreted as representing the five vanquished Muslim "kings" said to have participated in the battle.

== Background ==
Portugal had been involved in the Reconquista or reconquest of territory back to Christendom ever since the capture of Porto by Vímara Peres in 868.

After the Battle of São Mamede in 1128, Afonso Henriques wrested control of the County of Portugal from the regent-countess Teresa, who was driven to exhile as her forces were defeated on the field. He then relocated his court from Guimarães to Coimbra, a strategic move as it allowed him to focus on the southern frontier and was a better base from which to carry out the Reconquest, essential to his credibility, and furthermore the region lacked an established landed aristocracy, which allowed Afonso to rule unimpeded. Seizing the county however caused him to then enter into conflict with his suzerain, king Alfonso VII of León, but a peace between the two was signed at Tui in 1137.

The southern frontier of Portugal remained under threat from Muslim forces of al-Andalus, and every year both Christians and Muslims conducted cross-border raids to capture spoils or people and destroy property. The Almoravids ruled al-Andalus and they had already sieged the then capital of Portugal, Coimbra, in 1117. As early as 1135 therefore, Afonso had reinforced the defenses of Coimbra and the southern border with the construction of the frontier Castle of Leiria. It played an important part as an outpost half-way between Coimbra and Santarém, perched upon an isolated outcrop that drops down in a cliff on its southern side but it was destroyed by Almoravid forces in 1137, while Afonso Henriques was busy with his forces fighting Alfonso VII to the north. At the same time, a Portuguese force was destroyed by the banks of the river Nabão.

The Almoravid ruler Ali Ibn Yusuf called inscreasingly on the resources of al-Andalus to face a revolt by the Almohads in Morocco. His prince and heir Tashfin had been an effective governor of al-Andalus since 1128 and done much to maintain the Almoravid position in the peninsula. In 1138 however, he was called back to Morocco, which was a serious blow.

Banner of arms of the count of Portugal

With the signing of the Treaty of Tuy, both Afonso and Alfonso were free to focus on fighting the Muslims once more. Incursions by Christian armies deep in Muslim territory were not unheard-of. Though still at war with neighbouring Navarre but no longer preoccupied with the Portuguese border, King Alfonso VII of León himself advanced in a campaign that reached as far as the Guadalquivir in 1138. From the banks of that river, he divided his army into a number of detachments that sacked the regions of Jaen, Baeza, Ubeda and Andujar. Alfonso VII reached places never before attacked by the Christian realms of northern Iberia and even came close to the Almoravid capital in al-Andalus, the lack of opposition encountered by the Leonese exposing the weakness of Muslim forces in the peninsula.

Meanwhile, Afonso Henriques appears to have focused on preparing a campaign against the Muslims in the two years after signing the peace with León in 1137. The Almoravids had obtained a string of victories against Portugal since the time of Count Henry, and a powerful army had to be mustered in order to conduct a suitable and successful punitive campaign. Troops were gathered in May 1139 and departed towards south the following month in July. The Portuguese probably numbered about 800 to 1,000 knights and 1,600 to 2,000 footmen, among spearmen and crossbowmen. It included a number of distinguished men, such as the royal standard-bearer Garcia Mendes de Sousa and the castellan of Coimbra Gonçalo Dias de Góis, among others.

The campaign appears to have been timed to coincide with the Leonese siege of Aurelia or Oreja. Alfonso VII had gathered a powerful army to take that stronghold and the Almoravid governors of Cordoba and Seville had drawn substantial forces from their garrisons in west to fight the Leonese. Few means would therefore be available to face the Portuguese as they advanced.

== Battle ==
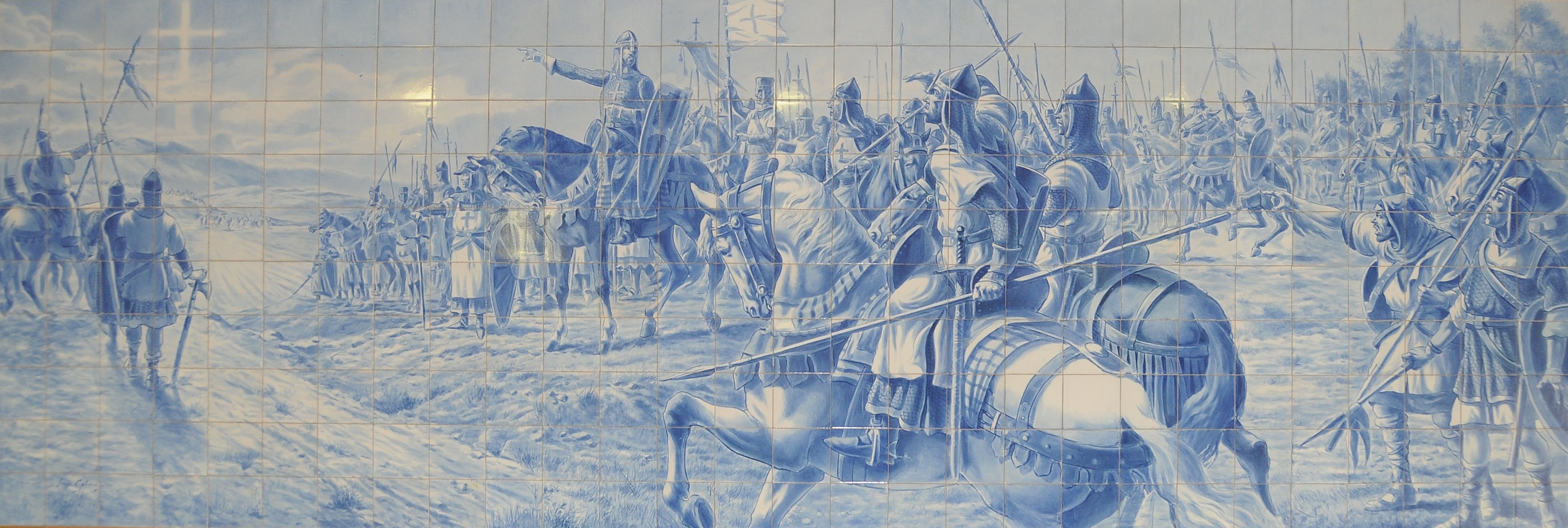
Azulejos tile panel depicting Afonso Henriques at the Battle of Ourique, by Jorge Colaço.

Once the Portuguese army was on its way, Afonso Henriques must have crossed the Tagus on the fording points either at Praia do Ribatejo or Constância. In doing so, Afonso manifested the intention of threatening Silves, the most important city in western al-Andalus. As most Almoravid forces were by then concentrating in aiding Oreja, little resistance appears to have been mounted against the Portuguese.

The advance of "Ibn Errik" as Afonso was referred to as among the Muslims was such that Almoravid authorities could not possibly hope for aid from their eastern garrisons in Iberia, but still it admitted no delay in looking for aid, wherever it could be found. The damages caused throughout the Ghrab al-Andalus were such that "Ismar", likely the governor of Cordoba Muhammad Az-Zubayr Ibn Umar, called upon all available forces from the major garrisons of Badajoz, Évora, Elvas, Seville and Beja, among other minor strongholds, and set out in pursuit of the Portuguese, while they were already on their way back to Portugal loaded with spoils. The Almoravid force included Muslim warriors "from both sides of the sea", meaning Iberia and the Maghreb. Apparently a number of women accompanied it. The Portuguese host was by that point moving slowly because of the spoils and prisoners. They were at that point south of Beja in the vicinity of Ourique.

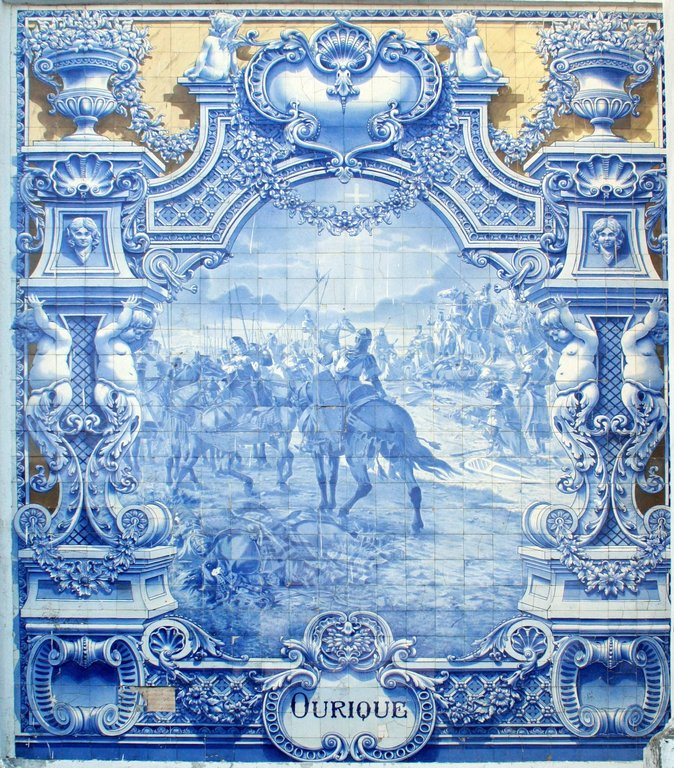
"Ourique", monumental tile panel by Jorge Colaço in Lisbon.

Muslim scouts and the Portuguese sighted each other in the middle of the day of 24 of July, and as a battle was found to be unavoidable, Afonso directed his host to a hill where a war-camp was set up under the scorching summer sun. The compound was fortified with trenches and the night was spent on that spot. Shortly before the dawn of July 25, day of Santiago, Afonso had the war instruments sound as a warning that they would set out to battle soon. Before combat, he was lifted atop his shield in old germanic fashion and hailed as "king" by his troops.

The Muslims were the first to strike, as they attempted to breach the Portuguese camp. The Portuguese host later sallied out organized in a vanguard, two wings and rearguard, to meet the bulk of the enemy force. In the battle that followed at a now lost location, the Muslim vanguard was shattered by a heavy cavalry charge. Afonso himself killed an enemy with his lance. The Portuguese then advanced to the second Muslim squadron but fighting broke down into a disorganized melée. Yet the Portuguese benefitted from heavier armour.

The battle lasted either until midday or afternoon. Unable to halt the Christian advance, the majority of the Muslims withdrew, many being killed in the rout. Ismar fled. The women in the Almoravid army were recounted by the Portuguese as having fought "like Amazons".

Even though the Christian Portuguese forces were strongly outnumbered, the Muslim armies were weakened by internal leadership problems, which led to Afonso Henriques's victory and subsequently his proclamation as King of the Portuguese, as Afonso I, with the support of his troops, vanquished and slayed, so legend had it, five Muslim kings.

== Aftermath ==
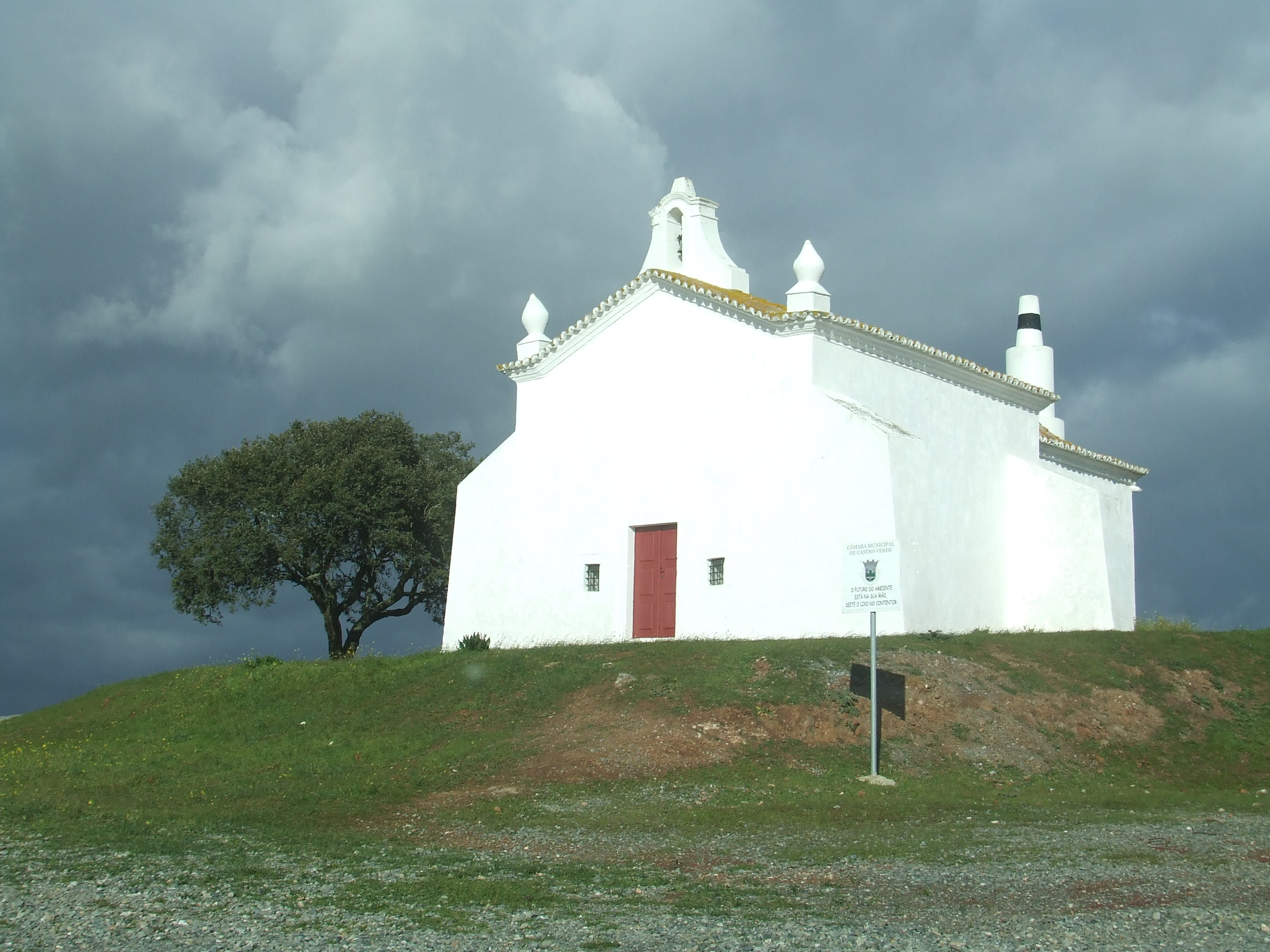
Hermitage later erected on the site of the Portuguese camp.

A considerable number of Portuguese perished in the battle. The dead included Diogo Gonçalves de Cete. After returning to their camp, Afonso had a number of prisoners beheaded and their bodies buried on the spot. The Portuguese host resumed their march back to Coimbra only three days after the battle, the usual manner by which a victory was claimed and clearly demonstrated.

Muslim casualties are unknown. "Ismar" survived the battle, and would later regroup his forces at Santarém in preparation for a retaliatory campaign, suggested by Abu Zakaria. Leiria had been rebuilt but in 1140 it was once again razed. Ismar then marched deep into Portuguese territory in a raid of his own and reached as far as Trancoso which he sacked, but in the vicinity of this town he was once again routed by Afonso Henriques at the Battle of Trancoso.

Ourique played an important part in the development of the Portuguese state. Afonso adopted the title of king and began signing his documents as such. After April 1140, the usual style was rex Alfonsus.

Further Christian incursions deep into al-Andalus would follow the battle of Ourique. King Alfonso VII of Leon conducted another devastating attack in 1144 that reached the region of Granada. In 1178 Afonsos son and heir Sancho would lead a great campaign deep into al-Andalus which reached the gates of Seville and became known as the Triana Raid.

=== Legend ===
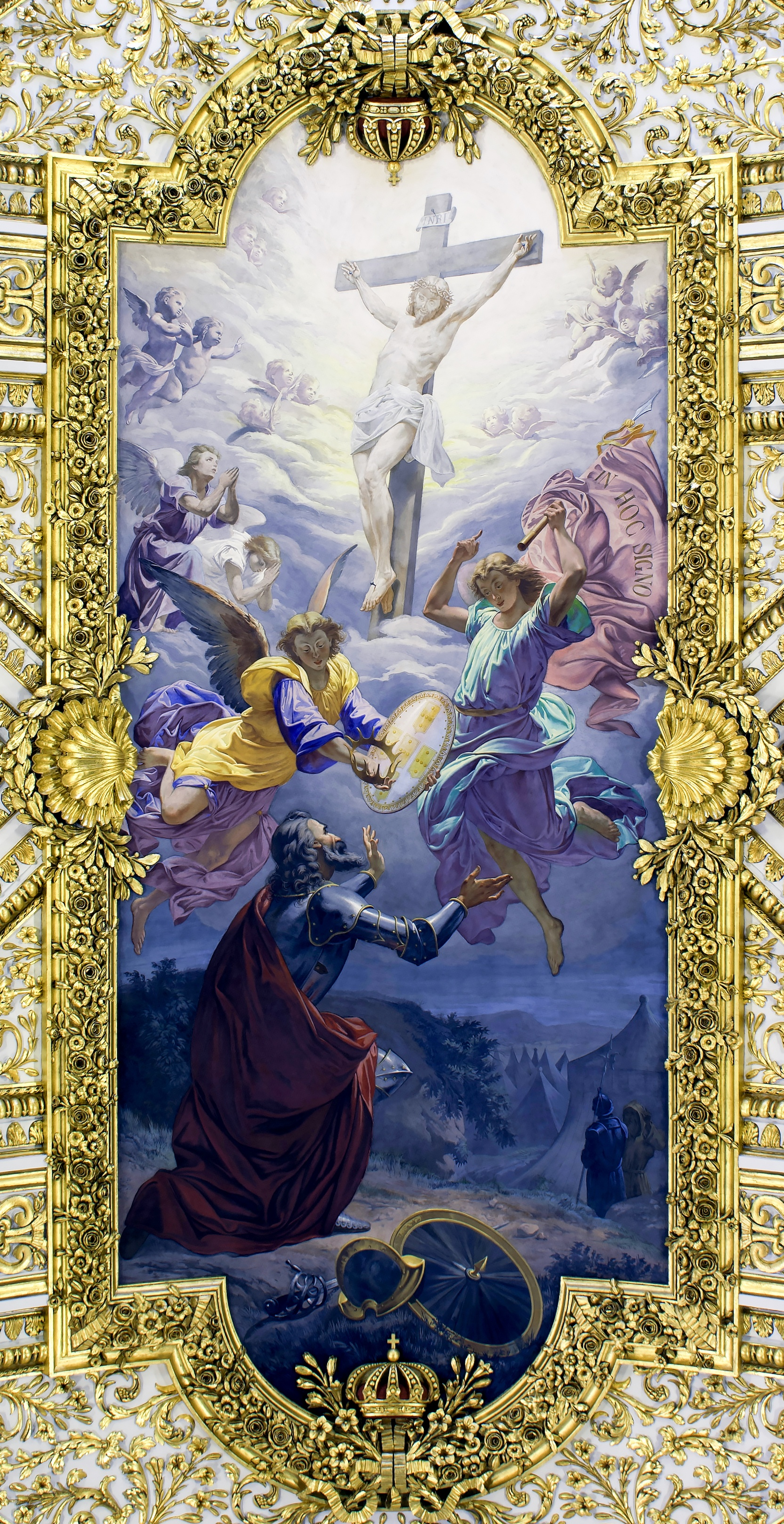
Afonso Henriques's vision of Jesus Christ and the Guardian Angel of Portugal during the Battle of Ourique (1139)

In the legend of Ourique, Henriques was visited before the battle by an old man who dreamed that Henriques would be victorious because God would intervene in his favour. He advised him to leave the encampment alone when he heard the bell of the local chapel. Riding off, he was surprised by a ray of light that showed him the sign of the cross and Jesus Christ on a crucifix, according to one interpretation. Henriques knelt in its presence and heard the voice of Christ, who told him he would defeat the Almoravids, which he, through courage and his faith, succeeded the following day.

Though the oldest surviving accounts of the battle do not mention the event, by the 14th century the tradition was already well established. It became a foundational stone of Portuguese identity, that offered evidence of the divine sanction and purpose of the kingdom, as well as an anchor of hope in times of national crisis. It played an important part in mobilizing the Portuguese against Castile during the Interregnum and later influenced Sebastianism.

The legend appeared in the Crónica de Portugal de 1419 and was accepted as fact until Alexandre Herculano reexamined the event, judging it a "pious fraud", in his investigation in the middle of the 19th century.

== See also ==
- Siege of Lisbon (1142)
- Conquest of Lisbon
- Timeline of Portuguese history
- Portugal in the Middle Ages
- Military history of Portugal
- Knight-villein
- Manifestis Probatum
