= Siege of Coimbra (1064) =

Date	January 20th to July 9th, 1064
Location	Coimbra, Portugal
Result	Christian victory
Territorial changes	Conquest of Coimbra by Christian forces

Belligerents
Kingdom of León; County of Portugal	Taifa of Badajoz

Commanders and leaders
Ferdinand I of León	Unknown

Casualties and losses
Unknown	5,000 captives

The siege of Coimbra in 1064 or the definitive conquest of Coimbra by Christian forces took place in 1064, from January to July; it ended on 9 July 1064, a Friday, when the king, Ferdinand I of Leon, captured the city from the Muslims.

The city of Coimbra had previously been taken from the Christians by Almanzor (or al-Manṣūr) in 987. When the Fitna of al-Andalus broke out and the Umayyad Caliphate of Cordova fragmented into numerous taifa states, Dom Sesnando Davides, lord of Tentúgal proposed the conquest of the city to Ferdinand of Leon. Ferdinand thus began preparations for the campaign in December 1063, after receiving the remains of Saint Isidore of Seville in León.

Before he moved against Coimbra however, he made a pilgrimage to Santiago de Compostela. Having prayed there before the tomb of the apostle, St. James of Compostela, for three days and made several donations to the church there, he departed accompanied by his wife Dona Sancha, his sons, the Bishop Crescónio of Santiago, Bishop Vistruário of Lugo, Bishop Suário of Mondonhedo, Bishop Sesnando of Portugal, the abbot Ariano of Cela Nova, abbot Pedro of Guimarães, and a large number of nobles. They advanced through a coastal road that linked Santiago de Compostela to Iria Flavia to Braga, Porto and Coimbra.

They arrived before the walls of the city on 20 January 1064. The Muslim garrison fiercely resisted the Christian attacks. The supply situation of the Christians was not favourable and Ferdinand even pondered lifting the siege. At the end of six months however, his forces managed to open a breach in the walls using battering rams, and the Muslim command sought to surrender in exchange for their lives before the final assault, the Muslim general having in fact delivered himself and his family to Ferdinand. The rest of the population, however, did not accept surrender and continued to resist. With food supplies running low in the city, it was violently taken by storm, with many killed and 5000 Muslims taken captive. King Ferdinand entered the city on 9 July 1064.

The city was then delivered to Sesnando Davides, who ruled it as Count of Coimbra until his death in 1091. The city would become an important settlement place for Mozarabs (Portuguese: moçárabes) arriving from Muslim lands to the south.

== See also ==
- Siege of Coimbra (1117)
- County of Coimbra
- Portugal in the Reconquista
