= Siege of Coimbra (1117) =

- Part of Reconquista
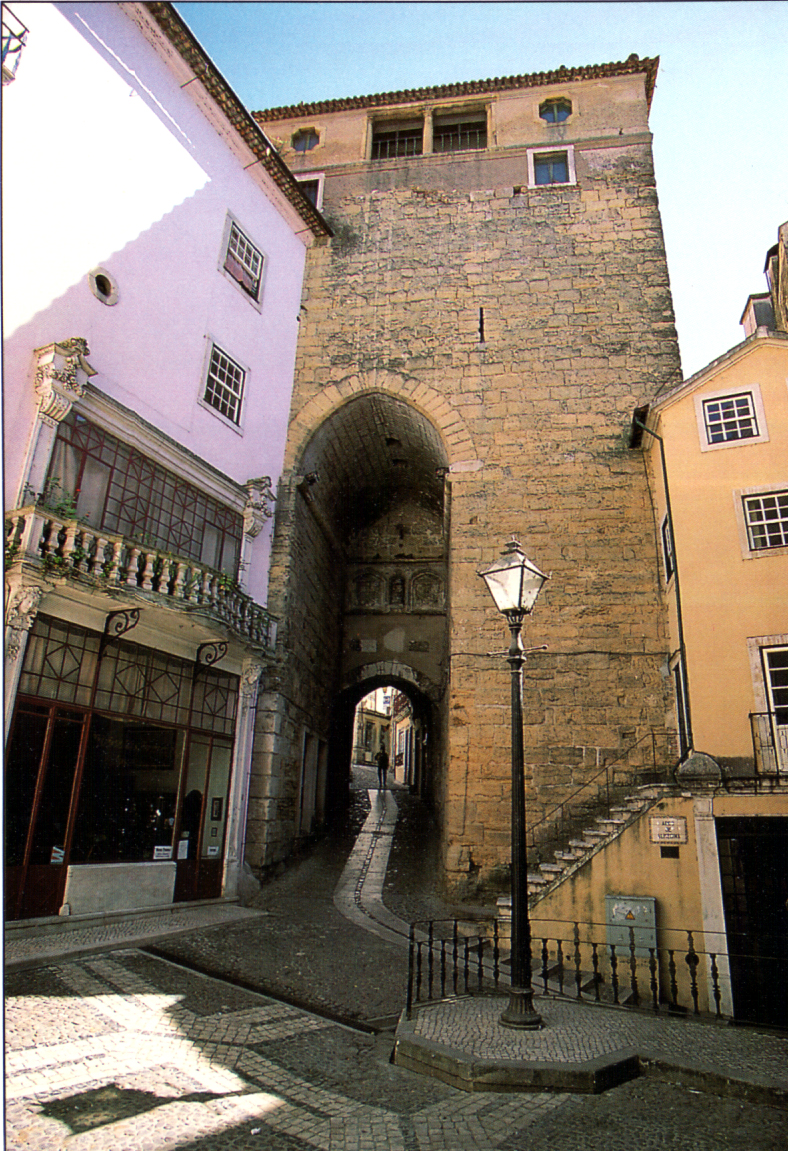
- Medieval gateway in Coimbra.
Date	2–22 June 1117
Location	Coimbra
Result	Portuguese victory

Belligerents
Almoravids	County of Portugal

Commanders and leaders
Ali ibn Yusuf: Governor of Cordoba Yahya ibn Tashfin	Theresa, Countess of Portugal

Strength
Unknown	Unknown

Casualties and losses
Unknown	Unknown

The siege of Coimbra of 1117 was a military engagement between the forces of the Almoravid dynasty and those of the County of Portugal in the city of Coimbra. In 1117, the Almoravids launched a campaign into the County of Portugal to attack the city of Coimbra and withdrew after failing to capture it.

== Background ==
In 1111, the Almoravids attacked Portugal, captured Santarém and raided as far as Coimbra. A Moorish attack on Coimbra had been anticipated before the death of Count Henry, but it did not take place until 1116. In this year, the Almoravid forces led by Abdul-Malik seized two fortresses that protected the city, Miranda de Beira and Santa Eulalia. They put the garrison of the first to the sword and enslaved the second, including its governor, Diogo. The defenders of Soure thinking resistance was useless, left their base and took shelter in Coimbra. This attack effectively destroyed the outer defenses of Coimbra.

In 1117, the Almoravids, led by Ali ibn Yusuf landed at Montemor-o-Velho in Portuguese territory again. He brought African forces reinforced by Andalusians, as many as the "grains of the sand of the sea," according to one chronicle.

== Siege ==
The Almoravids attacked the outskirts, killing and enslaving. The Portuguese weren't able to push back the Almoravids, and many retreated within the castle, including countess Theresa. The city was surrounded for 20 days and the suburbs sacked. The Almoravids subjected Coimbra to daily assaults, however they were ultimately unable to take it and the walled city remained undamaged.

Ali then withdrew from the city to Seville. Keeping Coimbra would have proven hard for the Almoravids to defend in a hostile land.

The siege of Coimbra marked the height of Almoravid power in Iberia. After the successful defense of Coimbra, Countess Theresa started addressing herself as queen.

== See also ==
- Henry, Count of Portugal
- Afonso I of Portugal
- Al-Andalus
- Portugal in the Middle Ages
  - Portugal in the Reconquista

== Bibliography ==
- Muhammad Abdullah Enan, The State of Islam in Andalusia, Vol. III: The Era of Almoravids and Almohads, Part 1, p. 81
- H. V. Livermore, A history of Portugal, p. 55-6
- Hugh Kennedy, Muslim Spain and Portugal, A Political History of Al-Andalus.
- Bernard F. Reilly, The Contest of Christian and Muslim Spain 1031 - 1157.
- Freddy Silva: First Templar Nation Simon and Schuster, 2017.
- Jorge de Alarcão: Coimbra: A Montagem do Cenário Urbano, Imprensa da Universidade de Coimbra / Coimbra University Press, Jan 1, 2008, pp. 204–205.
- João Diogo Rodrigues de Carvalho: Santarém e a Reconquista: a Tomada da Cidade, 2022, Universidade de Lisboa, p. 34.
- Brian A. Catlos, Muslims of Medieval Latin Christendom, C. 1050-1614.
