= Monastery of Rates =

Church building in Portugal

Coordinates: 41°25′24.05″N 8°40′20.70″W

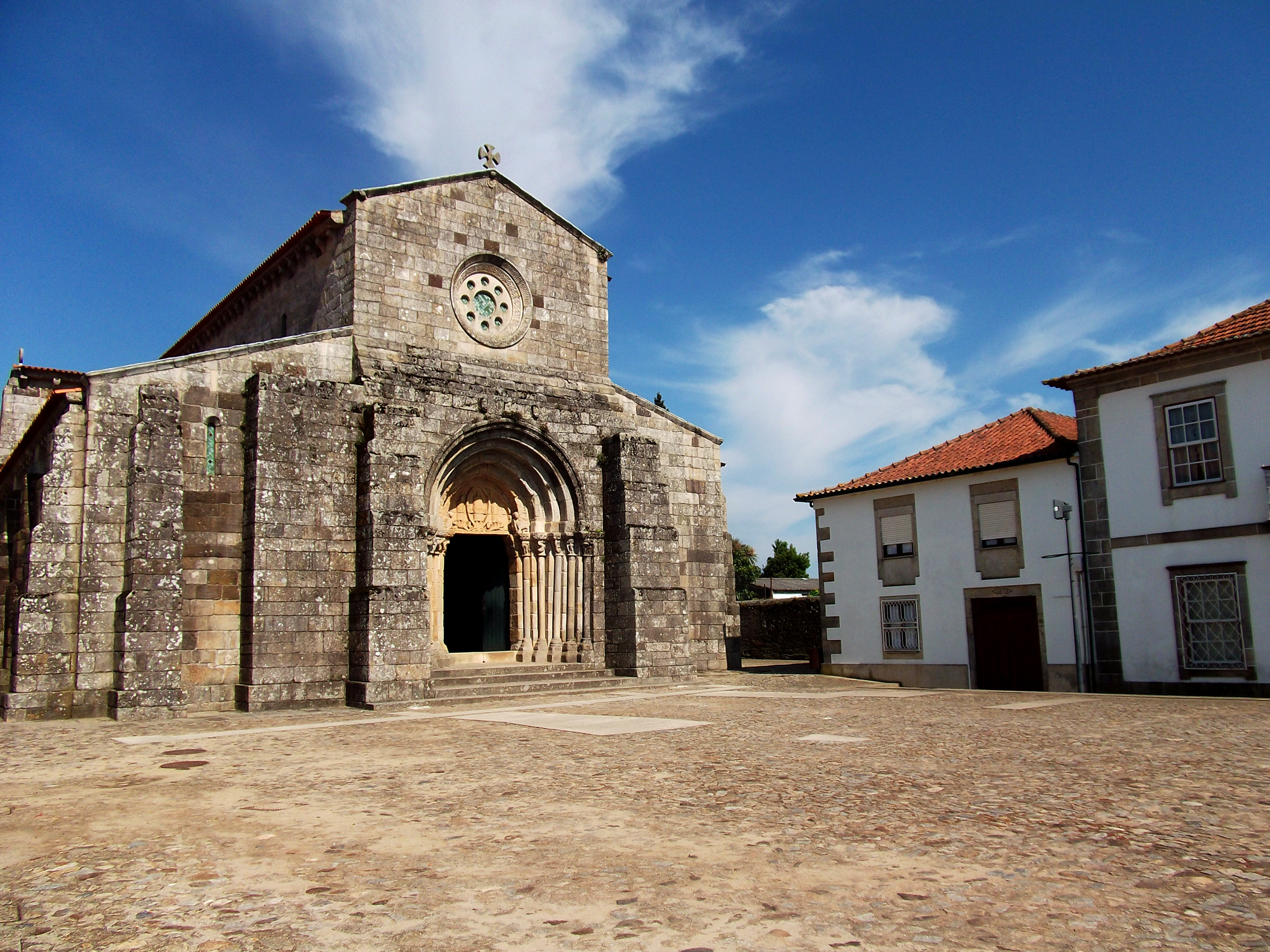
Main façade of the old church of the Monastery of Rates.

The Monastery of Rates (Portuguese: Mosteiro de Rates) was a Benedictine monastery located in the parish of Rates in the municipality of Póvoa de Varzim, in Portugal. The part of the monastery that has survived to this day is the bell-tower and, most importantly, the Church dedicated to St Peter of Rates (Igreja Paroquial de São Pedro de Rates), mostly known as Romanesque Church of Rates (Portuguese: Igreja Românica de Rates), which is a national monument since 1910. Reconstruction of the church began at the turn of the 11th to the 12th century, turning it into one of the oldest extant Romanesque churches in Portugal.

The medieval period of the monastery of Rates was one of the most important in the Romanesque art in Portugal, by the relations it established with the governing powers, the relevance of its architecture and sculptures with diverse influences make this temple a case study that is reflected in the production of the Romanesque art of the nascent kingdom of Portugal. The origin of the temple, that relate to the church itself, is dated to the Suebi-Visigothic period, although it incorporates older elements dating to the Roman period. Other elements also relate it to Asturian-Leonese period, prior to the prevailing Romanesque reconstruction.

== History ==
Main portal

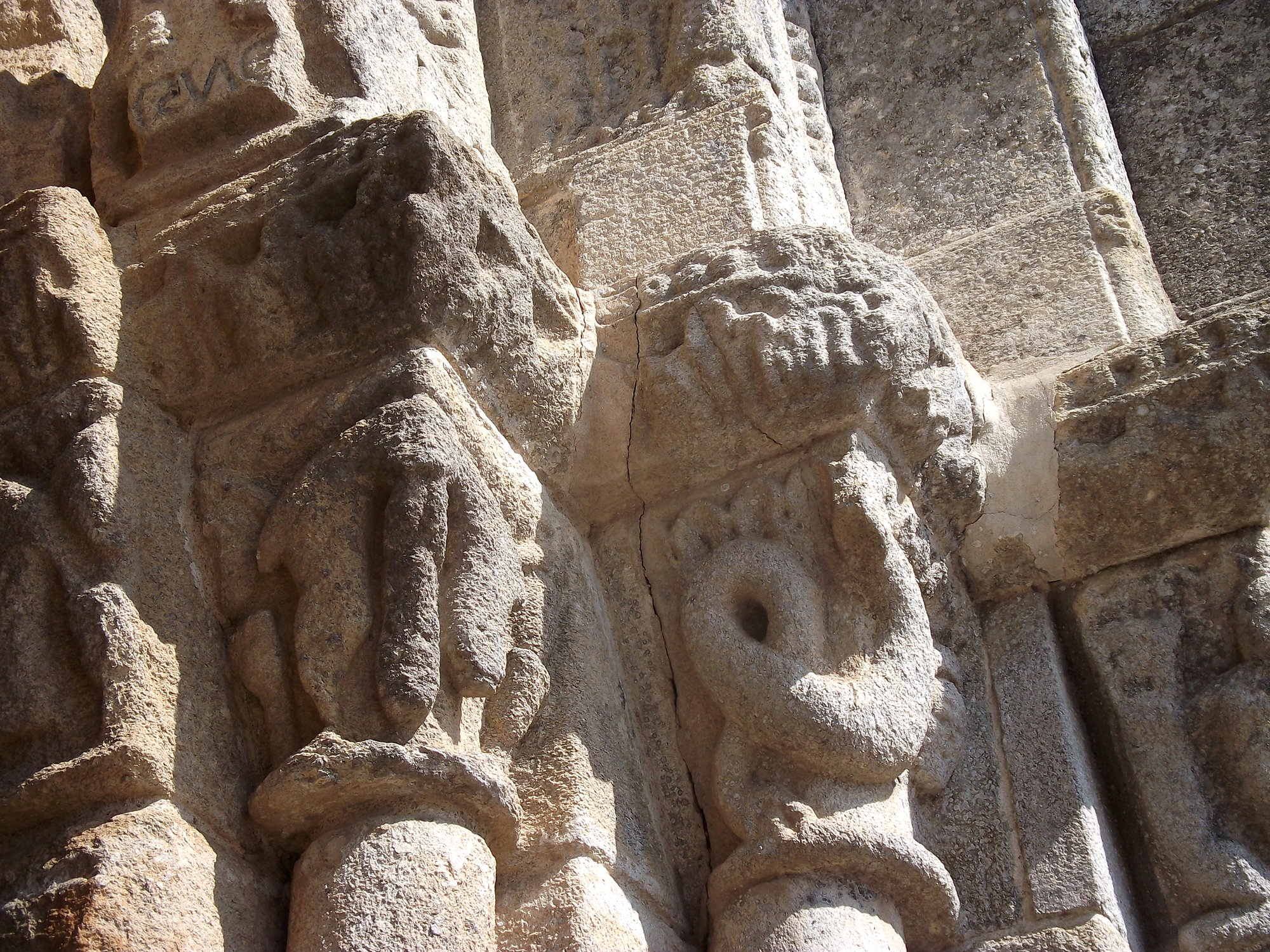
Detail of the main portal

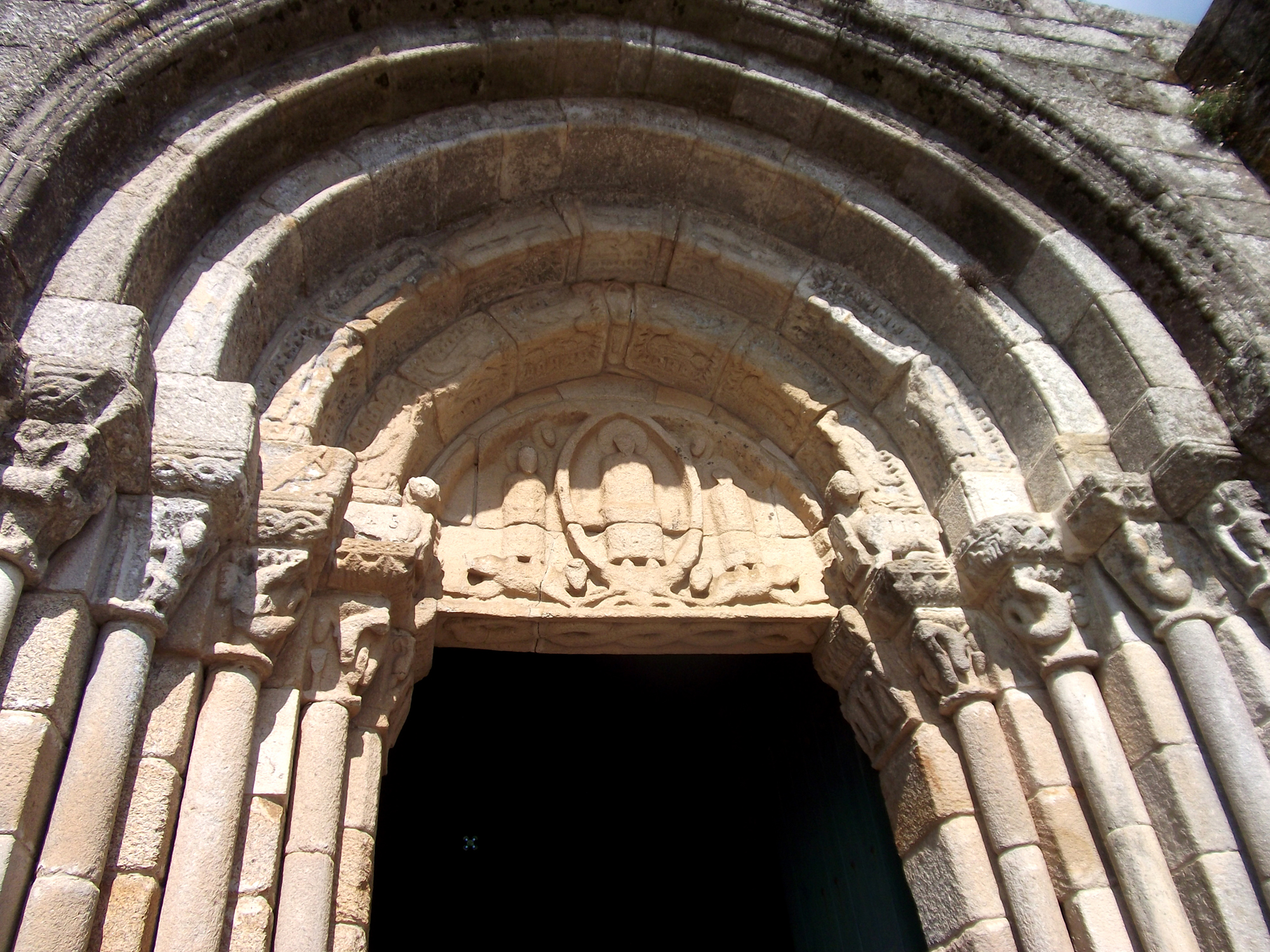
Main portal

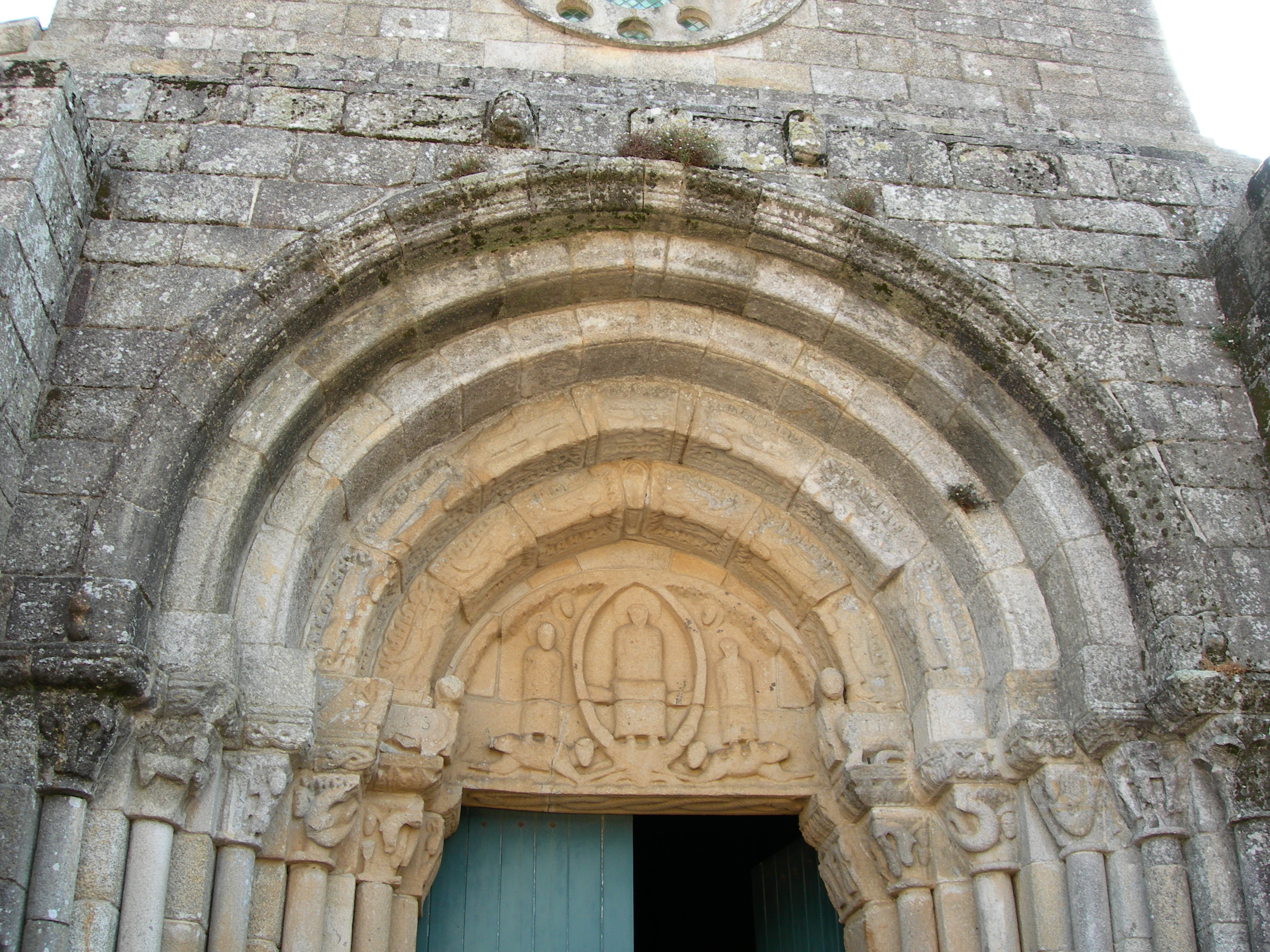
Another view of the main portal

=== Preromanesque period ===
According to legend, Peter of Rates came to the future Portuguese territory in the year 44 AD invited by Saint James the Great, one of Jesus's apostles. Peter is the legendary first Bishop of Braga and suffered martyrdom while trying to convert pagans to Christianity. Also according to legend, Peter's tomb was rediscovered in the 9th century, and a church was built to keep his remains. The relics were subject to pilgrimage during the Middle Ages.

The foundation of the Monastery of Rates is still rather mysterious. The building is of Asturian tradition and was totally rebuilt in the following centuries. But several material artifacts identify the origin of the temple to the Roman period. The archeological data retrieved in 1997 and 1998 in the surrounding area allowed the documentation of the several construction phases of the monastery and in particular from the 6th century to the present day. In the excavations, the knowledge about the Preromanesque period widened, namely with the probable narthex of the Preromanesque temple, where a Roman stele was found, this artifact was Christianized in the 6th and 7th centuries and, was after that, reused in the Preromanesque period.

Archaeological surveys have revealed vestiges of a Preromanesque church built between the 9th and the 10th centuries under the current building, and it is known that a monastic community existed in Rates at least since the 11th century.

Columns, capitals and arches

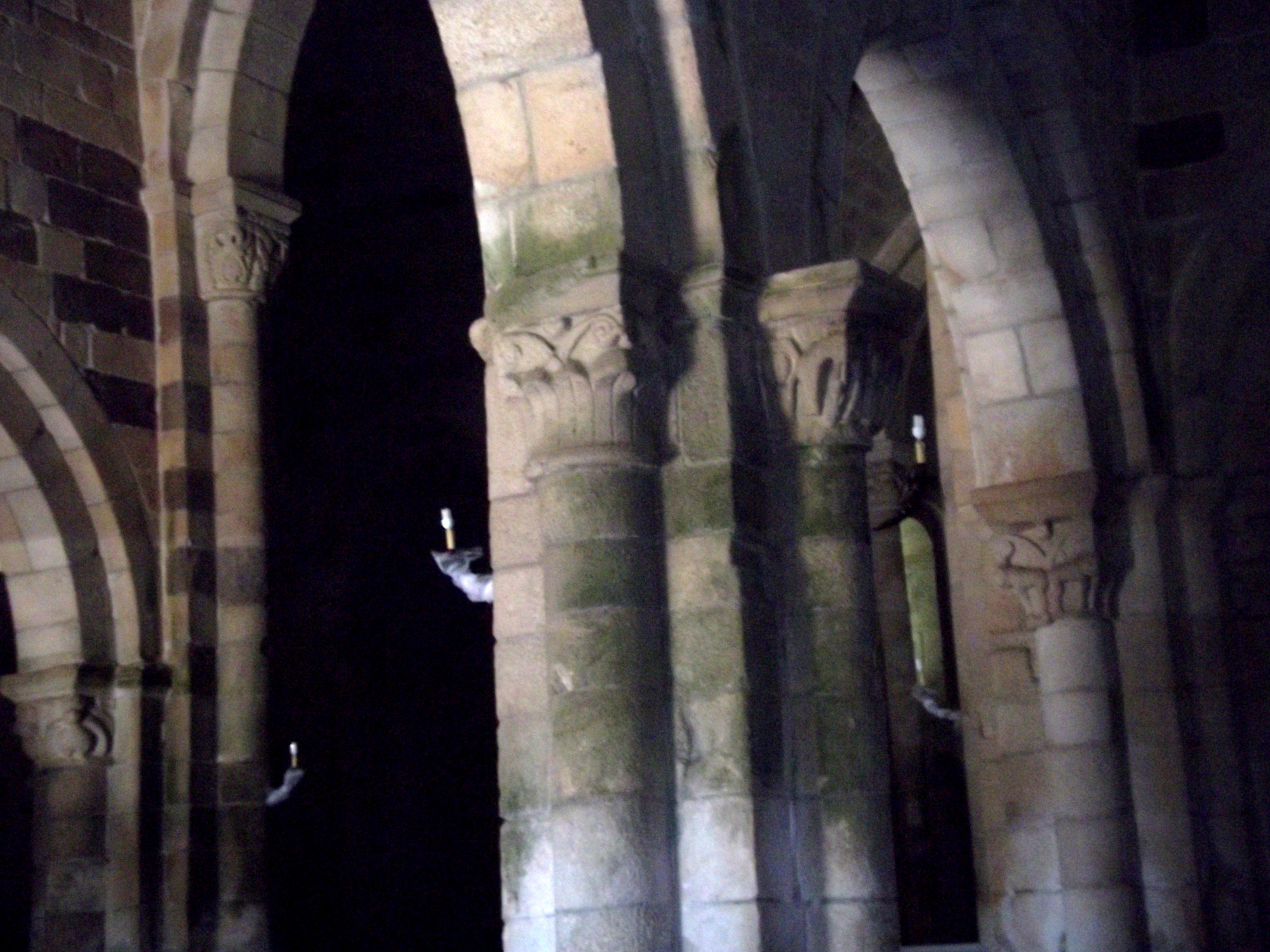
Lateral view over the columns

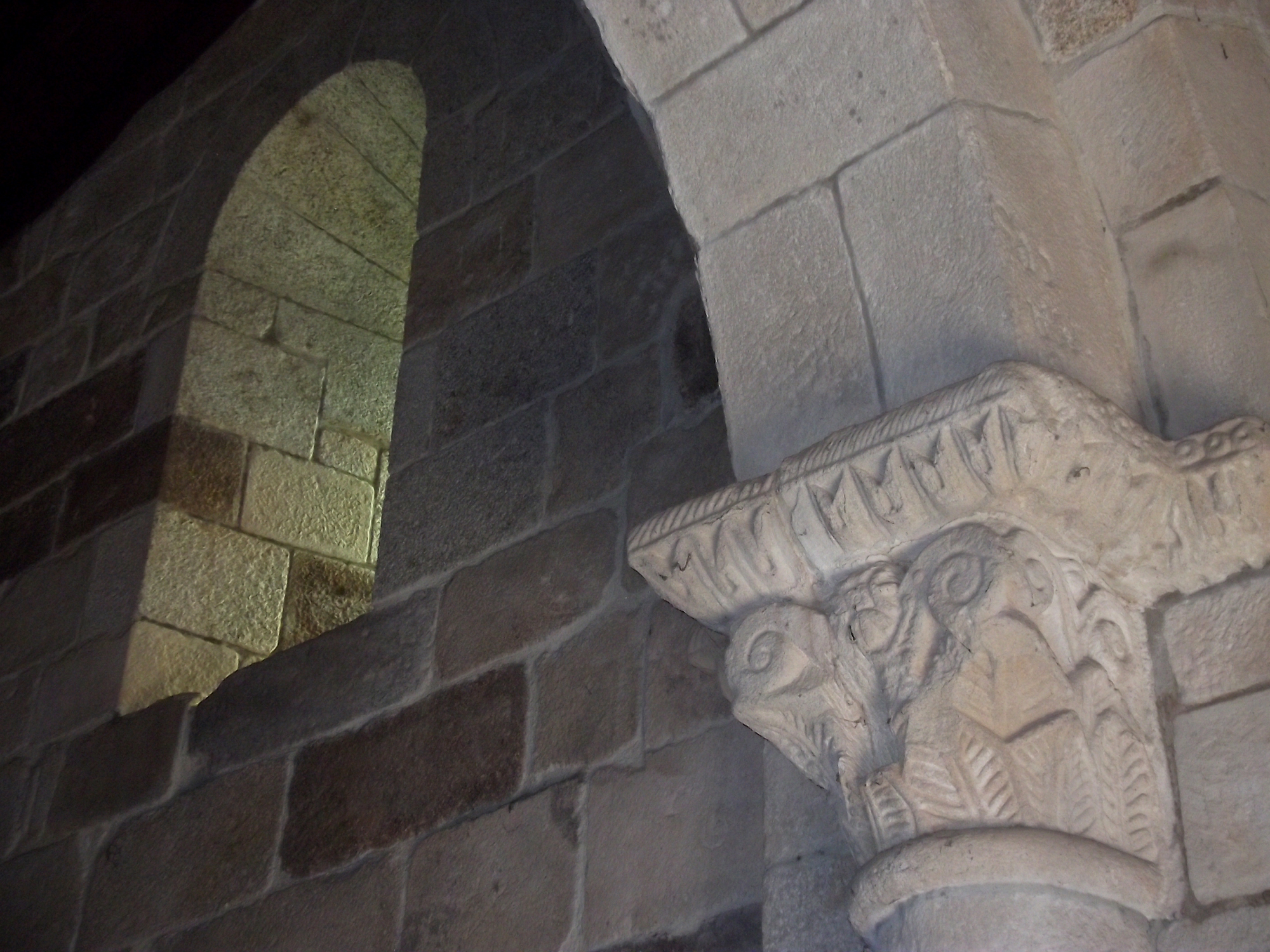
Capital of Corinthian form

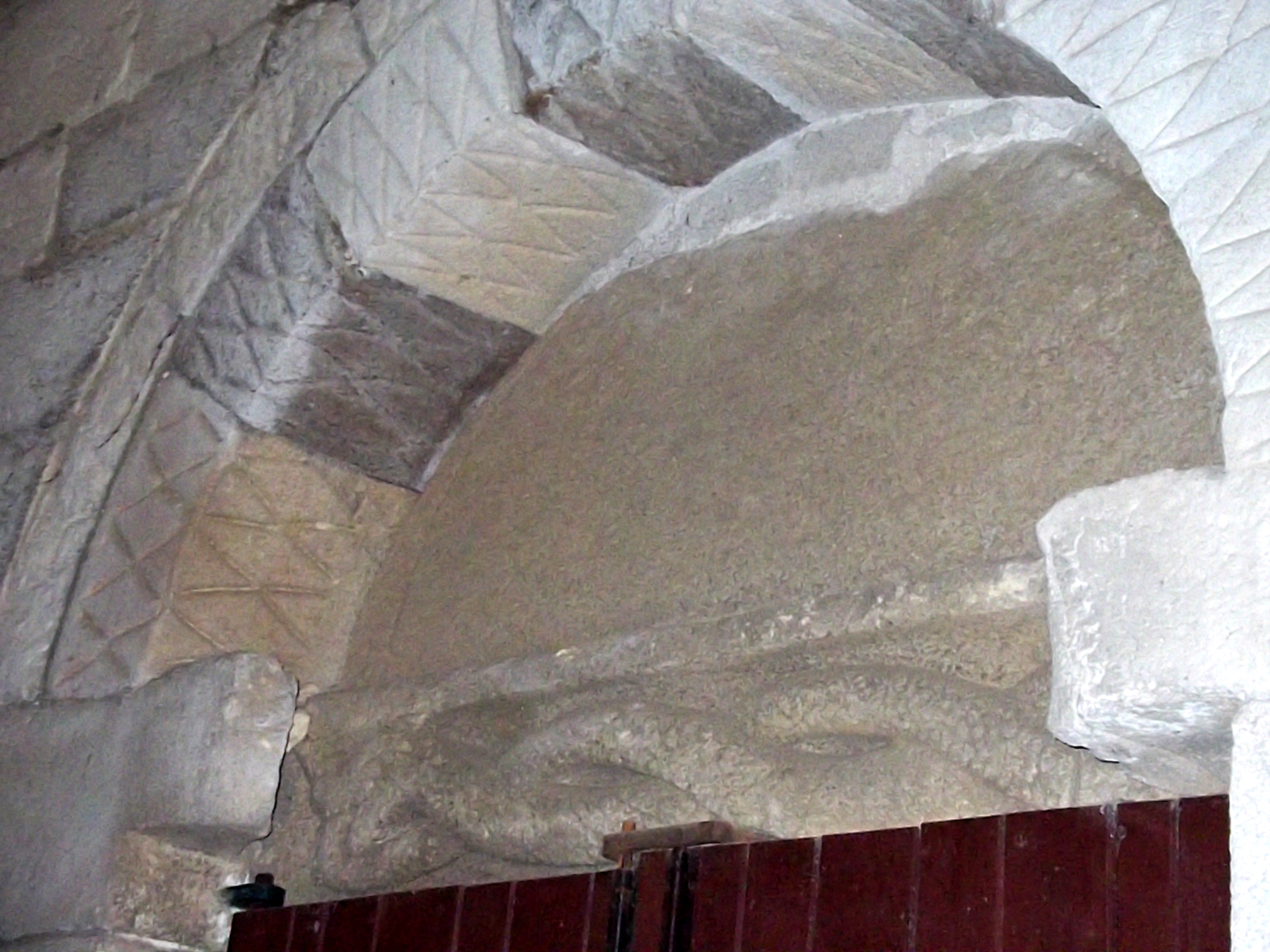
An ophiomorphous portal

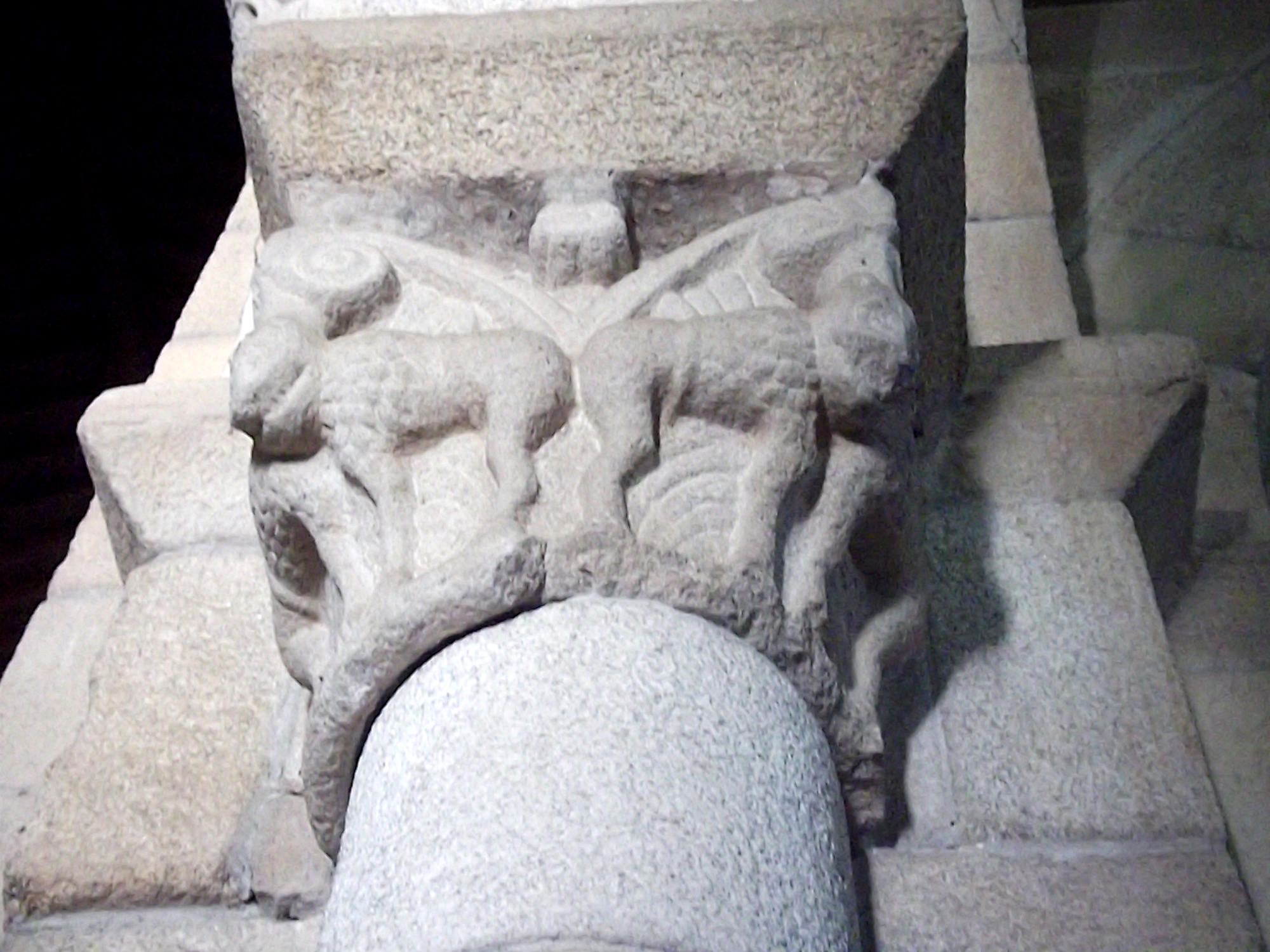
Capital with beasts

=== Romanesque period ===
However, the history of the current church begins around 1096, when Henry, Count of Portugal, sponsored the rebuilding of the monastery that was in ruins. It is known that, in 1100, Count Henry invited monks from La Charité-sur-Loire to come to Rates, in order to establish a Benedictine monastery of the Cluniac branch. Cluny was the most powerful religious community of the time and was headed by Abbot Hugh, a close relative of Count Henry.

Work on the construction of the church proceeded slowly and its stages are not known with certainty. The project of Count Henry's time was never finished, but the current configuration of the church - with a three-aisled nave, transept and three East chapels - corresponds to this initial project. However, the structure of some of the pillars of the nave indicate that the primitive plan predicted the building of a stone vault over the whole building. Many of the column capitals of the apse and transept have a very primitive design and probably date from this early project. The sculpture of other 12th century monastic foundations show great influence of the Rates worship, and attest to its importance in the early history of Romanesque architecture in Portugal.

It seems that the initial, ambitious building plan had to be modified around the mid-12th century, perhaps following the collapse of the roof of the apse and/or financial constraints. The stone vault project was abandoned and the nave and transept were now to be covered by a wooden roof.

The current building is the result of the Cluny rebuilding of the 13th century, because of the donation of Henry, Count of Portugal and Teresa of León to the monastery of Rates, that was ruined, to the Priorate, linked to the Order of Cluny, of La Charité sur Loire, Auxerre in France, so that Benedictine Rule was implanted there.

Columns, capitals and arches

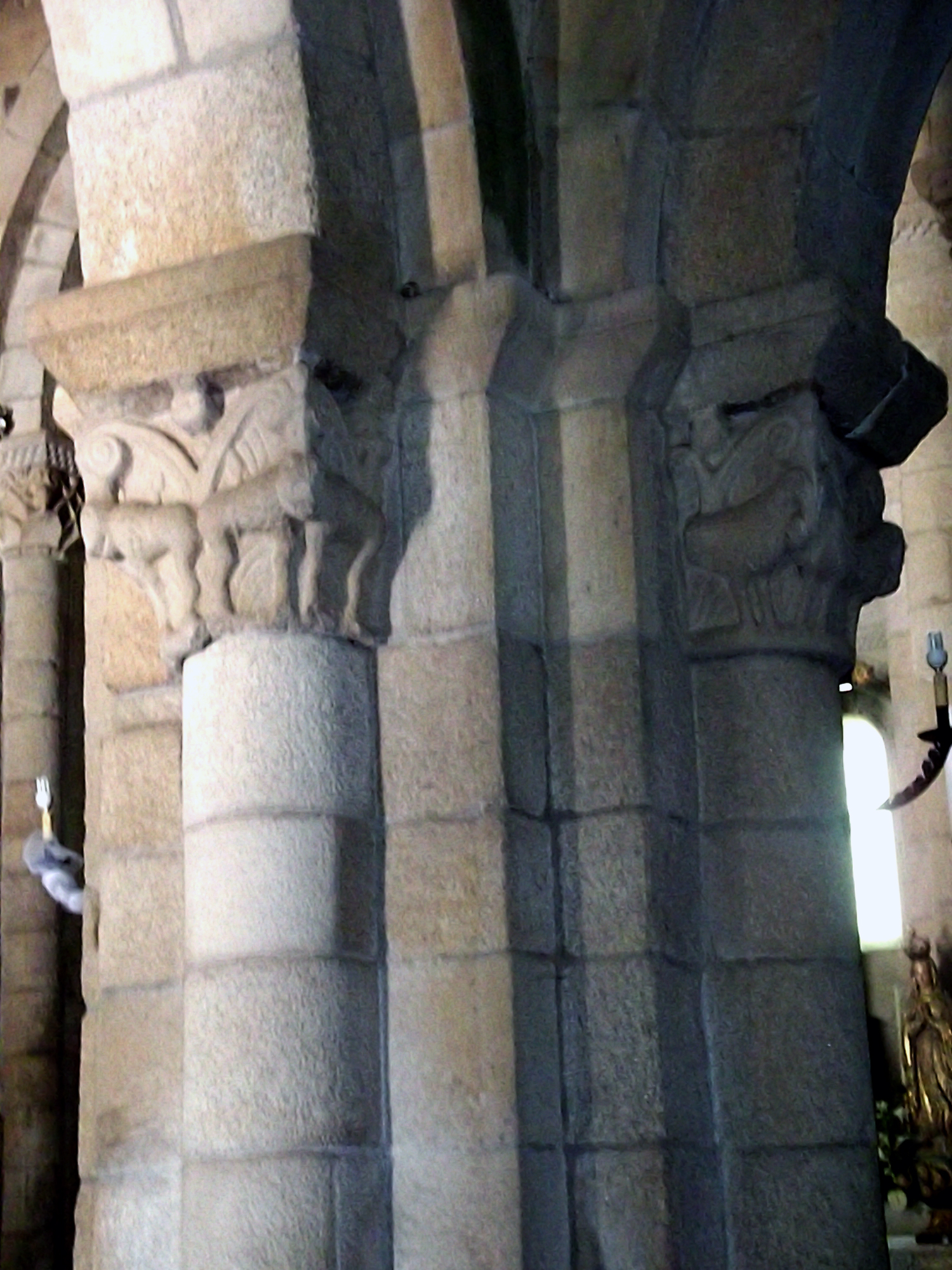
Capitals

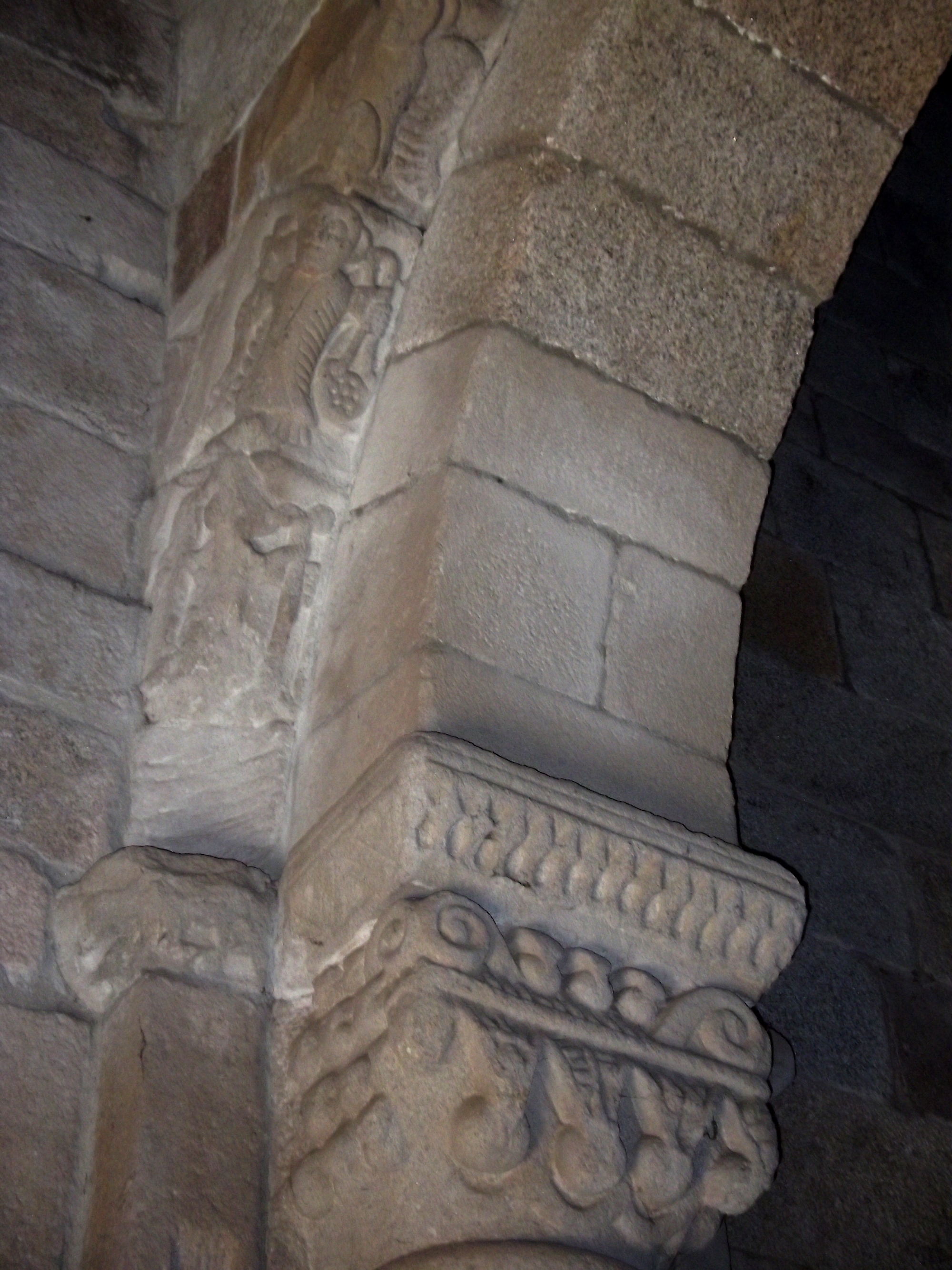
Anthropomorphic arch

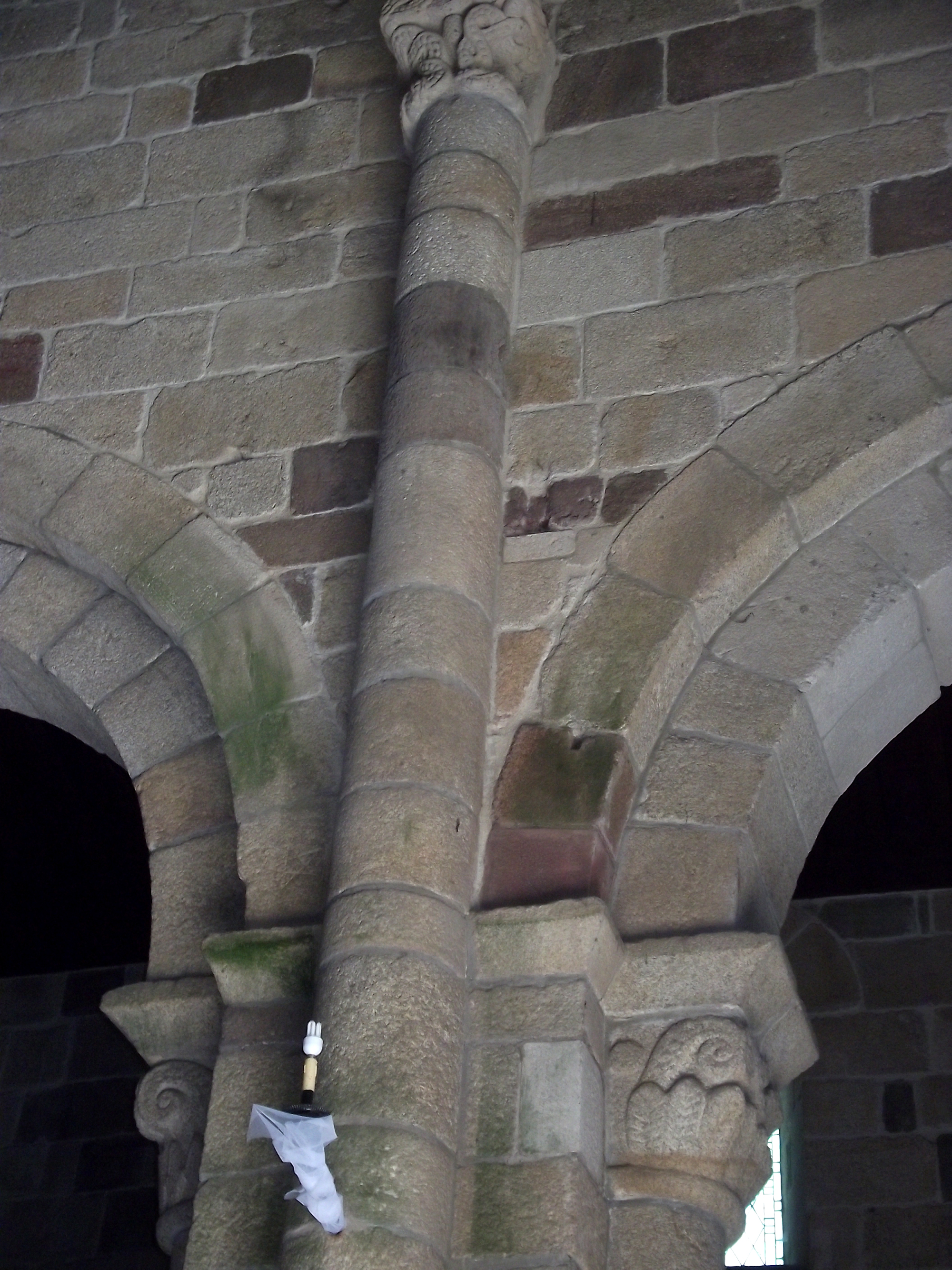
Decorative column

=== 16th to the 19th century ===
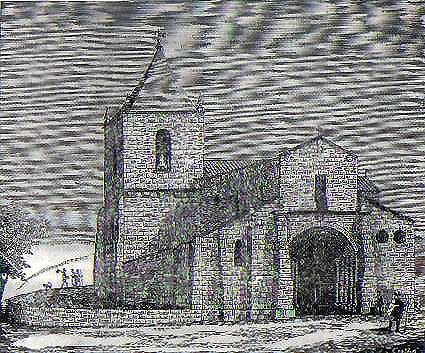
São Pedro de Rates church with the Gothic tower in 1842.

In the next centuries, the history of the Monastery of Rates was relatively unremarkable. In the early 16th century the monastery was granted to the knights of the Order of Christ.

In the 18th century the main chapel of the apse was greatly expanded in size and was given a rectangular shape. In the 19th century, with the dissolution of the religious orders in Portugal, the monastic church became a simple parish church of Rates.

=== 20th century to present day ===
After a period of decay, the church was recognised as one of the oldest and most influential of the Portuguese Romanesque churches. It was declared a national monument as soon as 1910, when Portugal started listing and protecting monuments.

In the 1930s and 1940s, it underwent a restoration by the Directory of National Buildings and Monuments (DGEMN) aimed at returning the building to its 12th-century look. The foundations and the stones and capitals of the original apse were still available, allowing for a relatively faithful restoration of the Romanesque main chapel. The rose window of the facade was also rebuilt. A Gothic bell tower over a transept arm was removed, as well as the sacristy on the Northern side of the apse.

General details

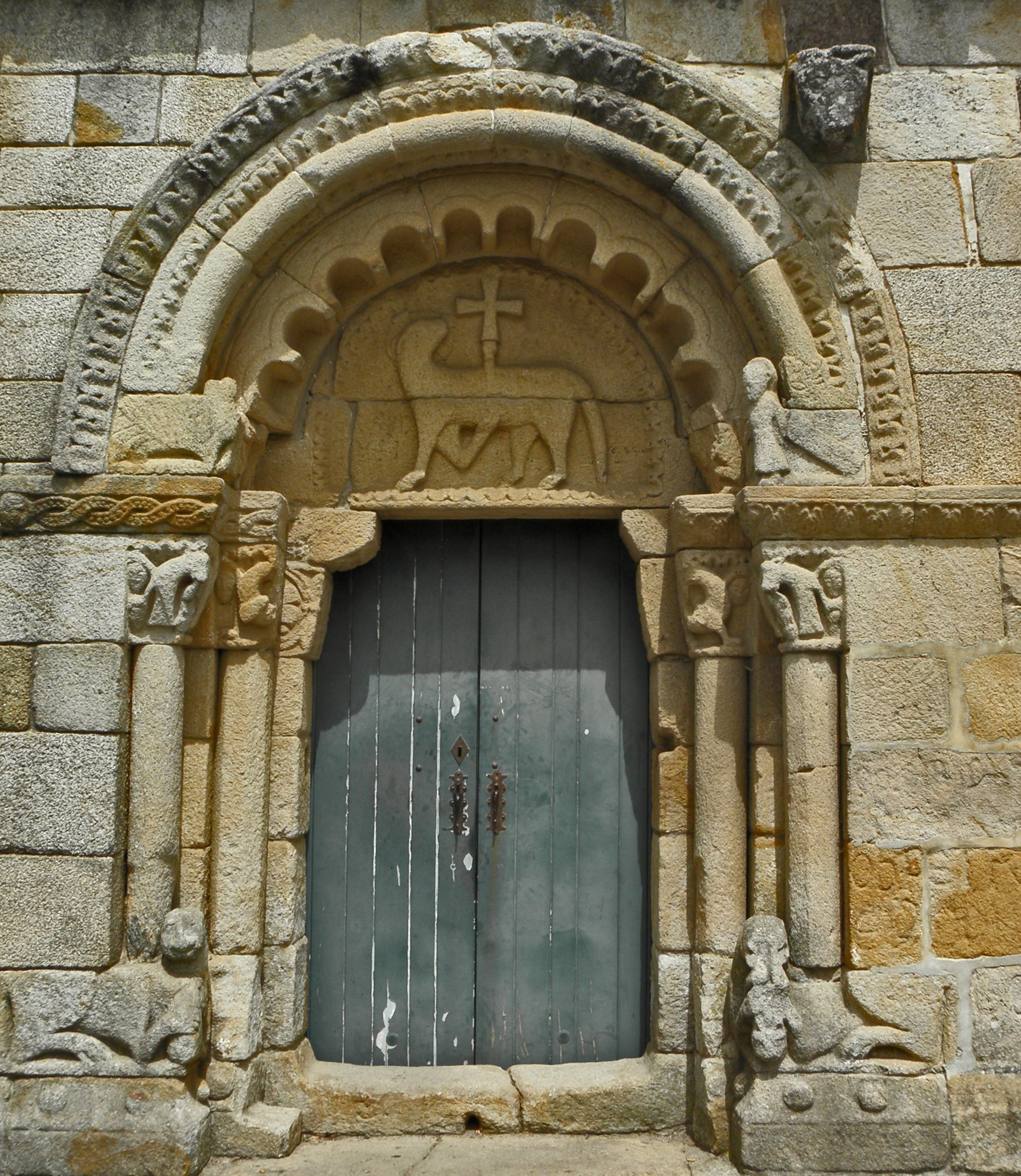
Anthropomorphic and zoomorphic portal

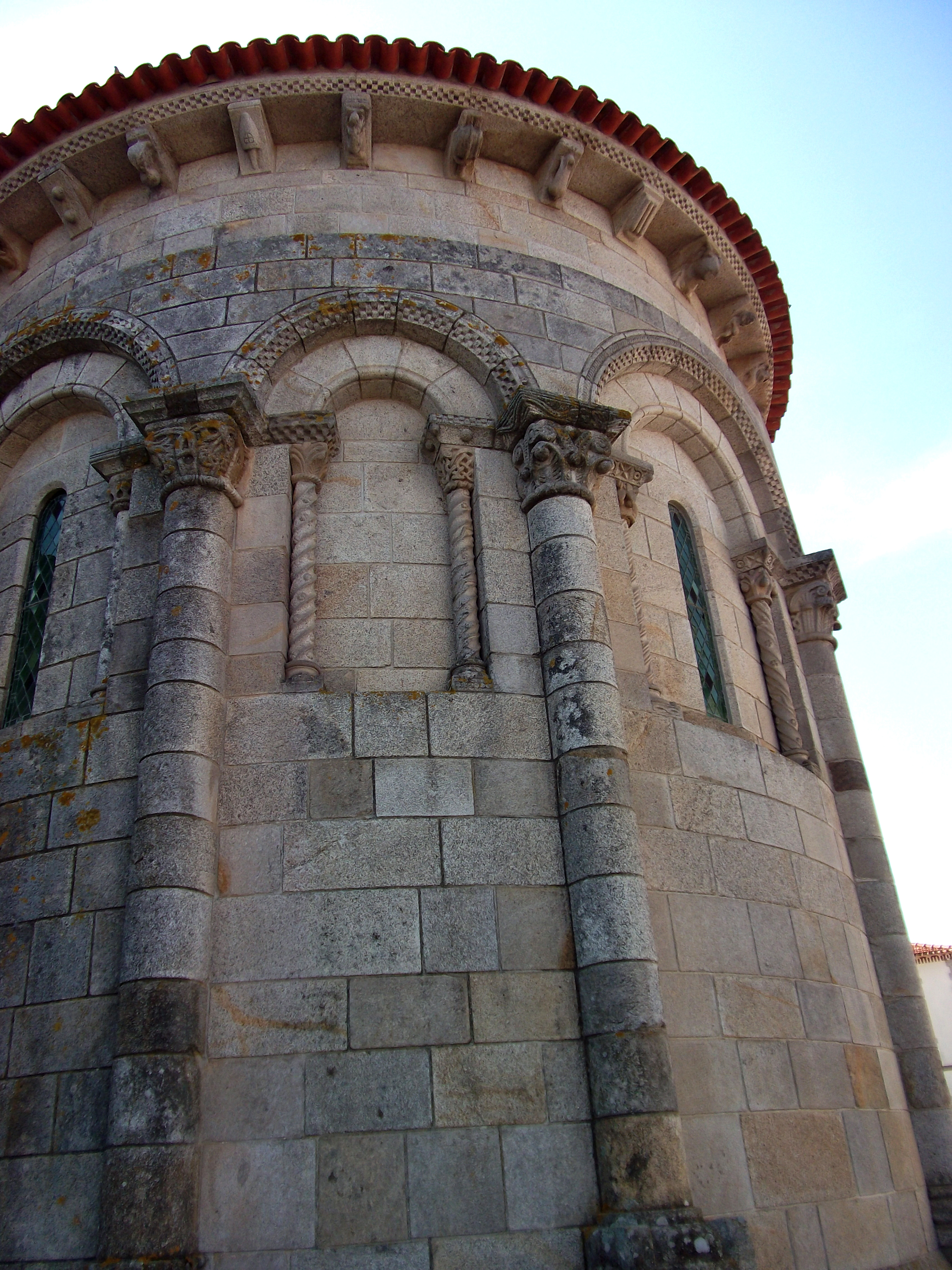
The apse

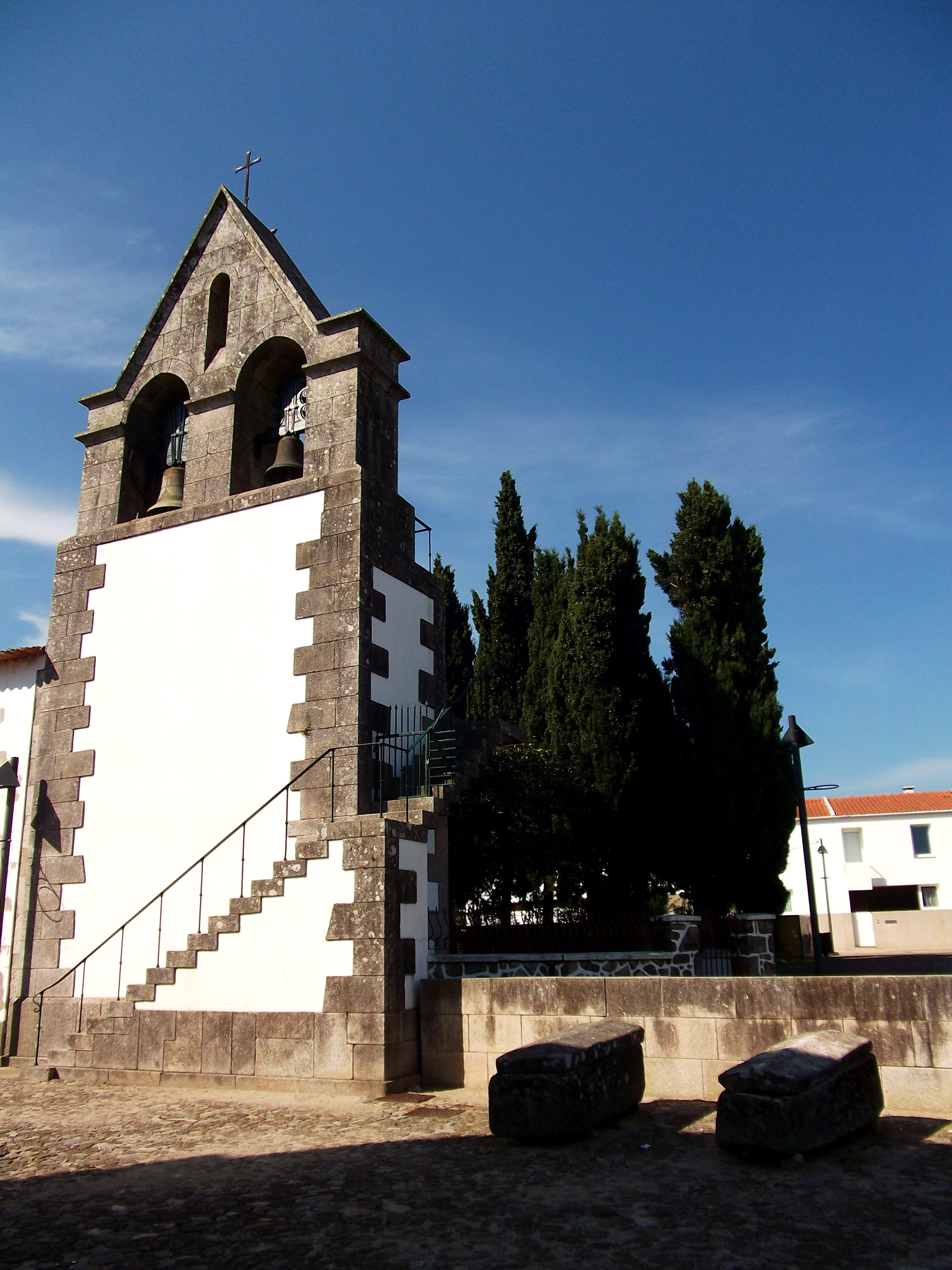
Monastery tower

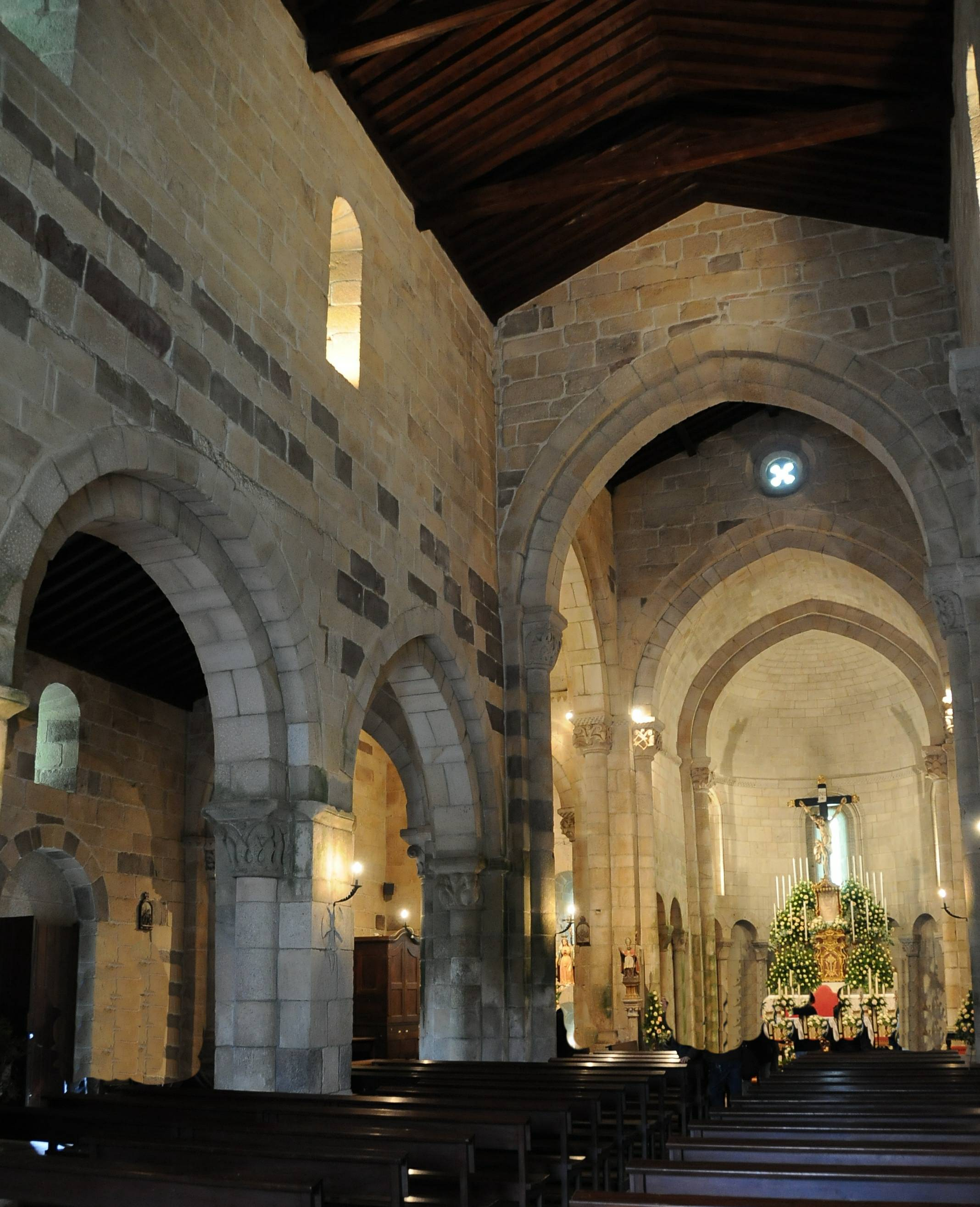
Interior of the church seen towards the main chapel
