= Urraca Henriques =

Portuguese Infanta and sister of Afonso I of Portugal

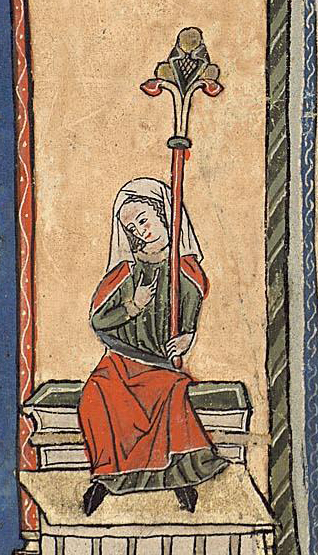
Urraca Henriques depicted in a goth manuscript from the 13th century

Urraca Henriques (born in Guimarães, 1095 - died in Pontedeume, 1173) was an infanta of Portugal, daughter of Henrique de Borgonha, count of Portucale and Teresa de Leão, condessa of Portugal. She was the sister of Afonso Henriques, the first king of Portugal.

She married Bermudo Pérez de Trava, a Galician magnate and member of the House of Traba, the most powerful in medieval Galicia, around 1122. He was the son of Pedro Froilaz de Trava and his first wife Urraca Froilaz.

In 1148, her husband commissioned the abbot of the Monastery of San Xusto to build a convent in the village of Nogueirosa near the town of Pontedeume. This place was part of the arras that he had given to the Infanta Urraca on 25 July 1122. Later, in 1150, Urraca donated various assets to the abbot and the monastery on the condition that she and four ladies from her family were admitted as nuns to a convent called Santa Maria de Nogueirosa.

Around 1160, Bermudo became a monk at the Monastery of Santa Maria de Sobrado dos Monges, a monastery founded by his ancestors, where he died in 1168 at the age of 80.

Urraca also retired, probably in the same year as her husband, to the monastery in Nogueirosa where she died in 1173 and was buried in the church of her convent.

== Offspring ==
The children of Infanta Urraca and Bermudo Peres de Trava were:

- Fernão Bermudes de Trava (d. after 1161).
- Urraca Bermudes de Trava "the elder", nun and abbess at the Monastery of Cascas.
- Soeiro Bermudes de Trava (d. 1169), count, buried in the monastery of Sobrado.
- Teresa Bermudes de Trava (d. c. 1219), buried in the monastery of Sobrado. She was the wife of Fernando Arias (nobleman) (d. 1204), Lord of Batisela.
- Sancha Bermudes de Trava (d. c. 1208), married Soeiro Viegas de Ribadouro, son of Egas Moniz o Aio, in 1152. A son from this marriage, Lourenço Soares, was the husband of Urraca Sanches, illegitimate daughter of the king Sancho I of Portugal.
- Urraca Bermudes de Trava "the younger" (d. after November 1196), the wife of Pedro Beltran with whom she had two children; Fernando Beltran and Elvira Peres.

== Bibliography ==
- Almeida Fernandes, A. de (1978). "Guimarães, 24 de junho de 1128" (PDF). Revista Guimarães (88). Guimarães: Sociedade Martins Sarmento: 5–145. ISSN 0871-0759.
- Almeida, Antonio (1837). "Erros histórico-chronologicos de Fr. Bernardo de Brito na chronica de Cister correctos em 1834". Memorias da Academia R. das Sciencias de Lisboa. Vol. XII, parte I. Lisboa: Typografia da Academia R. das Sciencias de Lisboa. OCLC 8878678.
- Caetano de Sousa, António (1735). Historia Genealógica de la Real Casa Portuguesa (PDF). Vol. I, Livros I e II. Lisboa: Lisboa Occidental, na oficina de Joseph Antonio da Sylva. ISBN 978-84-8109-908-9.
- David, Pierre (1948), "La pacte succesoral entre Raymond de Galice et Henri de Portugal", Bulletin Hispanique (in French), 50 (3): 275–290, doi:10.3406/hispa.1948.3146
- López Morán, Enriqueta (2004), "El Monacato Femenino Gallego en la Alta Edad Media (La Coruña y Pontevedra)" (PDF), Revista Nalgures (in Spanish), vol. I, A Coruña: Asociación Cultural de Estudios Históricos de Galicia, pp. 119–174, ISSN 1885-6349, archived from the original (PDF) on 2012-02-17
- López-Sangil, José Luis (2002). La nobleza altomedieval gallega, la familia Froílaz-Traba (in Spanish). La Coruña: Toxosoutos, S.L. ISBN 84-95622-68-8.
- Manrique, Ángel (1649). Anales cistercienses. Vol. 2. p. 413.
- Marques da Silva, Maria João Violante Branco (1993). "Portugal no reino de León. Etapas de uma relação (866-1179)". El Reino de León en la Alta Edad Media. La Monarquia (1109-1230). Colección fuentes y estudios de historia leonesa, Nº 51. Vol. IV. León: Centro de Estudios e investigación «San Isidoro,» Caja España de Inversiones, Caja de Ahorros y Monte de Piedad y El archivo histórico diocesano de León. pp. 533–625. ISBN 9788487667084.
- Martínez Díez, Gonzalo (2003). Alfonso VI: Señor del Cid, conquistador de Toledo (in Spanish). Madrid: Temas de Hoy, S.A. ISBN 84-8460-251-6.
- Mattoso, José (2014). D. Afonso Henriques (2ª ed.). Lisboa: Temas e Debates. ISBN 978-972-759-911-0.
- Pizarro, José Augusto de Sotto Mayor (2007), "O Regime Senhorial na Fronteira do Nordeste Português. Alto Douro e Riba Côa", Hispania. Revista Española de Historia, vol. LXVII, no. 227, Madrid: Instituto de Historia "Jerónimo Zurita." Centro de Estudios Históricos, pp. 849–880, doi:10.3989/hispania.2007.v67.i227.64, ISSN 0018-2141
- Reilly, Bernard F. (1982). The Kingdom of León-Castilla under Queen Urraca, 1109–1126. Princeton: Princeton University Press. ISBN 9780691053448.
- Rodrigues Oliveira, Ana (2010). Rainhas medievais de Portugal. Dezassete mulheres, duas dinastias, quatro séculos de História. Lisboa: A esfera dos livros. ISBN 978-989-626-261-7.
- Torres Sevilla-Quiñones de León, Margarita Cecilia (1999). Linajes nobiliarios de León y Castilla: Siglos IX-XIII (in Spanish). Salamanca: Junta de Castilla y León, Consejería de Educación y Cultura. ISBN 84-7846-781-5.
