= Henry I of Portugal =

Henry I of Portugal may refer to:

- Henry, Count of Portugal, the first ruler of Portugal with such a name.
- Henry, King of Portugal, the first king of Portugal to bear the name. Sometimes called "Henry II of Portugal" should the Counts of Portugal be included in the lists of Portuguese monarchs.
