= Henry of Portugal =

Henry of Portugal may refer to:

- Henry, King of Portugal (1512–1580)
- Henry, Count of Portugal (1066–1112)
- Prince Henry the Navigator or Infante Henry, Duke of Viseu (1394–1460)
