= Treaty of Lanhoso =

Agreement signed in 1121 between the County of Portugal and the Kingdom of Castile

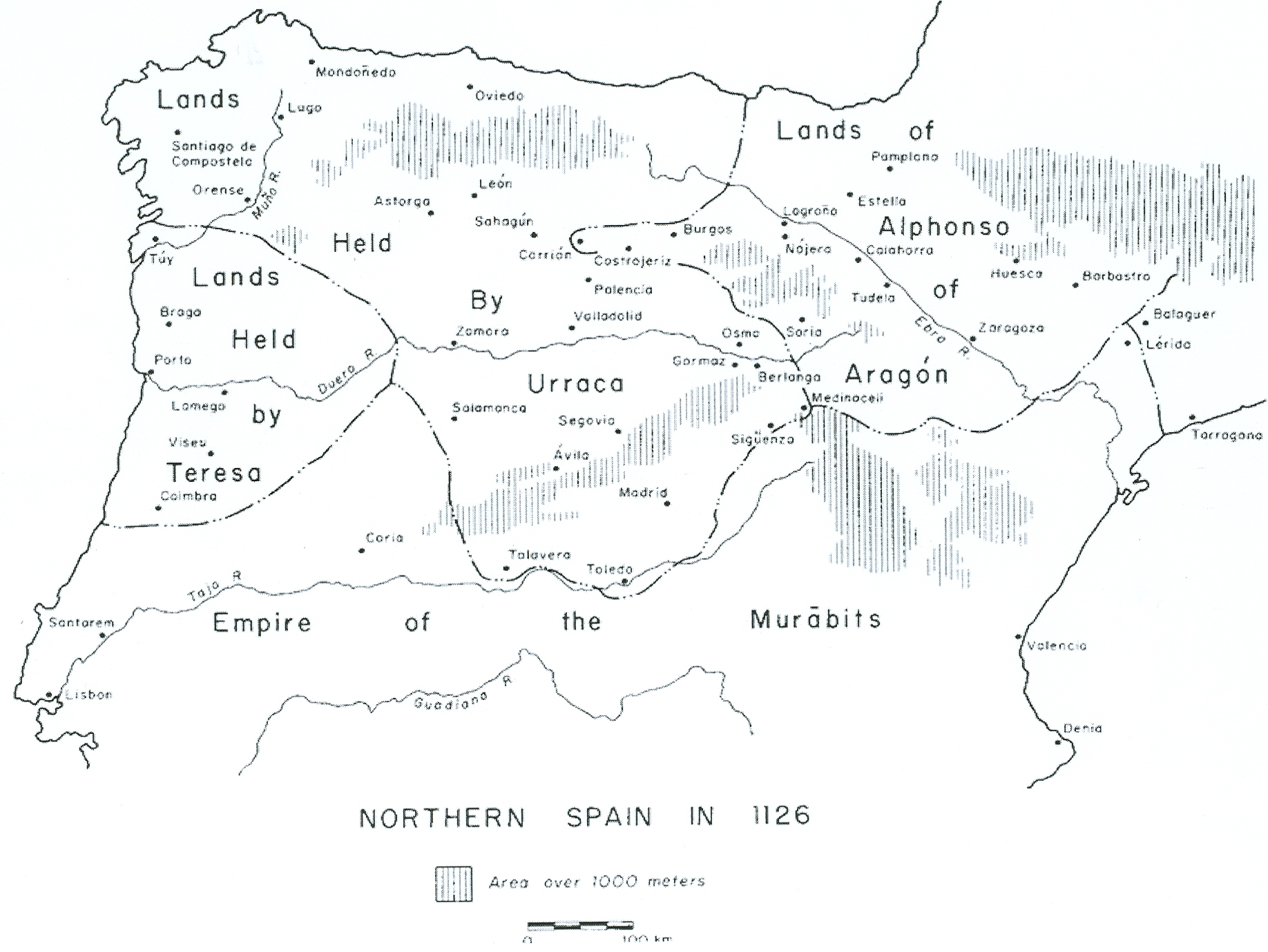
Political map of the north part of the Iberian peninsula in the year 1126

The Treaty of Lanhoso is an agreement signed in 1121 between the County of Portugal and the Kingdom of Castile at Lanhoso Castle, in the current municipality of Póvoa de Lanhoso.

== Details ==
In 1112, after the death of Henry of Burgundy, Teresa of León was named countess and regent of her son, Afonso Henriques, the future Afonso I of Portugal. Urraca of León and Castile, Queen of Castile and León, wanted to claim the Portuguese county. After several military victories in 1116 and 1120, Urraca besieged Teresa of León in Lanhoso Castle. Teresa managed to save her rule over the Portuguese county by agreeing vassalage to Castile. The treaty was signed thanks to the help of Diego Gelmírez, Archbishop of Santiago de Compostela, and Paio Soares da Maia, Archbishop of Braga.

According to scholar Janaina Reis Alves, in the signing of the treaty, Dona Urraca deconstructs the image of women as the weaker sex. Urraca reigned throughout a long period, facing attacks from her ex-husband, subduing her sister, and defending territories with the same success as her male peers.

"Teresa, [illegitimate sister of Urraca I], a shrewd, disloyal, and beautiful woman, soon took care to exploit the dynastic conflicts in favor of her authority, inducing Alfonso of Aragon to break with Dona Urraca. However, the crisis, triggered by the clash of this monarch with the nobles and bourgeois of Castile, forced Alfonso to withdraw to his domains in Aragon. Dona Urraca was angered by the attitude of her sister Dona Teresa, who, to appease her, declared herself her vassal. In 1115, we see her at the Cortes of Oviedo as a submissive infant (41:75-7). The Treaty of Lanhoso was established, whereby Dona Teresa recognized herself as a vassal, promising to defend her sister against Christian and Moorish enemies and traitors. In compensation, Dona Urraca granted her sister many lands in Salamanca, Ávila, Toro, and Zamora, with incomes and manorial rights from these cities. This is just one of many examples of the success of female governance on the Iberian Peninsula during the medieval period. Analyzing it and comparing it with the concept of the weaker sex applied by common sense allows us to see that this common sense is based on a long-outdated theory. However, it is still a theory and this should be explained in the classroom: when, how, why it was used, and who benefited from it, so that students can reflect and build knowledge critically." — (GALLI, 1997 p.31").

== See also ==
- Theresa, Countess of Portugal
- County of Portugal
- Póvoa de Lanhoso
