= Braga Cathedral =

Roman Catholic church in Braga, Portugal

- Sé de Braga
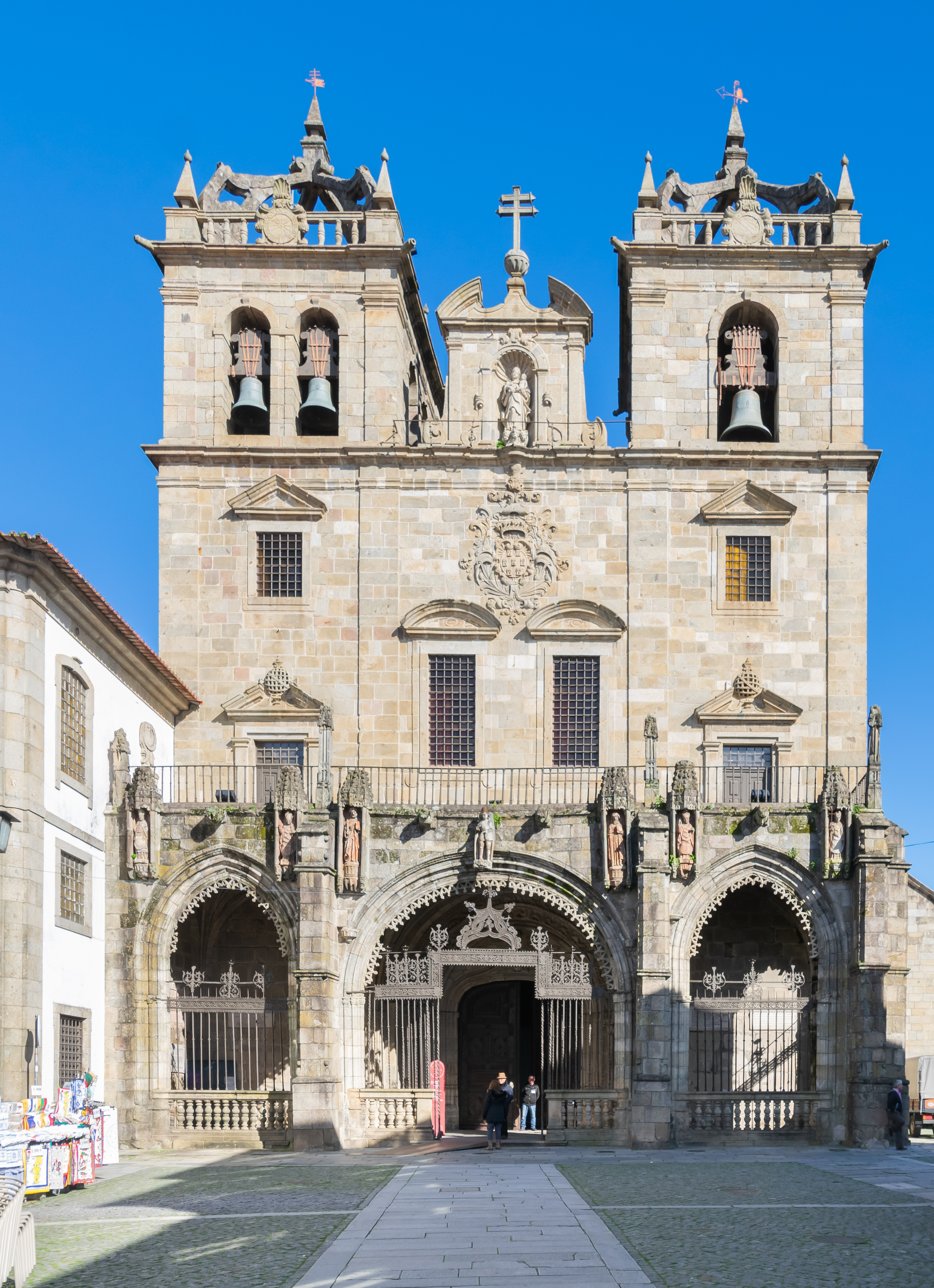
- Main façade of Braga Cathedral. The entrance gallery (galilee) with three arches is gothic (end of 15th century), but the towers and upper storeys are early baroque (17th century).

Religion
- Affiliation: Roman Catholic
- Diocese: Archdiocese of Braga
- Ecclesiastical or organisational status: Cathedral

Location
- Location: Braga, Portugal
- Interactive map of Braga Cathedral
- Coordinates: 41.5499°N 8.42736°W

Architecture
- Type: Church
- Style: Gothic, Moorish, Manueline, Baroque

The Cathedral of Braga (Portuguese: Sé de Braga) is a Roman Catholic church in the northern city of Braga, Portugal. Due to its long history and artistic significance, it is also one of the most important buildings in the country. It is the seat of the Archdiocese of Braga and of the Primate Archbishop of Portugal and Spain.

The cathedral has been classified as National Monument since 1910.

== History ==
The Diocese of Braga dates from the 3rd century AD, being one of the oldest in the peninsula and the centre for the Christianisation of Gallaecia (Northwestern Iberia).

Saint Peter of Rates or of Braga, is traditionally considered to be the first bishop of Braga between the years 45 and 60. Tradition says he was a Jew that had recently died when Saint James the Great was in the area. The Apostle knowing him to be a man of intelligence and good will had him resurrected from the grave and ordained him to preach the glory of Christ. The same tradition holds that Peter of Rates was martyred while attempting to make converts to the Christian faith in northern Portugal.

When Roman power was being dissolved by invading Germanic tribes, Braga (then called Bracara Augusta) became the capital of the Suebi Kingdom (409 to 584). Bishop Martin of Dumio, a great religious figure of the time, converted the Suebi to Catholicism around 550. The importance of Braga diminished during Visigoth times, and after the arrival of the Moors (716) it lost its bishop seat.

The bishopric of Braga was restored around 1071, after the city was back into Christian hands, and Bishop Pedro started to build a cathedral, consecrated in 1089 (only the Eastern chapels were finished). Starting in 1093, the County of Portugal was ruled by Count Henry of Burgundy who, together with Bishop Geraldo de Moissac, managed to convince the Pope to turn Braga into an archbishopric in 1107. The archbishop of Braga had power over a large region in Northwestern Iberia, including most of Portugal and part of Galicia, in today Spain. The Cathedral of Braga was the first Portuguese cathedral, erected several decades before the founding of the country when it was part of the Kingdom of León. It was consecrated and dedicated to the Virgin Mary by Bishop Pedro in a solemn session on August 28, 1089.

Construction on the cathedral was then resumed and lasted until the middle of the 13th century, but the details are obscure. The original 12th century-building was built in the Burgundian Romanesque style of the monastery church of Cluny. It influenced many other churches and monasteries in Portugal in that period. In later times the cathedral was greatly modified, so that today it is a mix of Romanesque, Gothic, Moorish, manueline and baroque styles. Particularly important were the addition of new chapels and the entrance gallery in gothic style, the new manueline main chapel, and the various additions in baroque times like the towers, chapels and much inner decoration.

The cathedral as the most important religious site in Iberia (before the founding of Santiago of Compostela and the reconquest of Toledo from Muslim hands) was an extremely powerful institution at the time and enjoyed a great degree of influence in the papal court. For example, the Archbishop Primaz D. Paio Mendes (1118–1137), considered by some historians to be the true teacher of D. Afonso Henriques, the first King of Portugal, instead of Egas Moniz, was an ardent defender of the cause of the Infante against his mother, D. Teresa of Léon. Counselor to the monarch, he traveled with him to Zamora. It had an influential role in the formation of the independence of Portugal, having used its position in the papal court of Pope Alexander III finally obtaining the approval of the Papal Bull Manifestis Probatum that recognized the independence of Portugal by the Papacy and consequently by all of Christendom. This Archbishop also ordered, in 1128, the construction of a building with 5 chapels in the transept of the Cathedral which was damaged by an earthquake.

== Art and architecture ==
=== Exterior ===
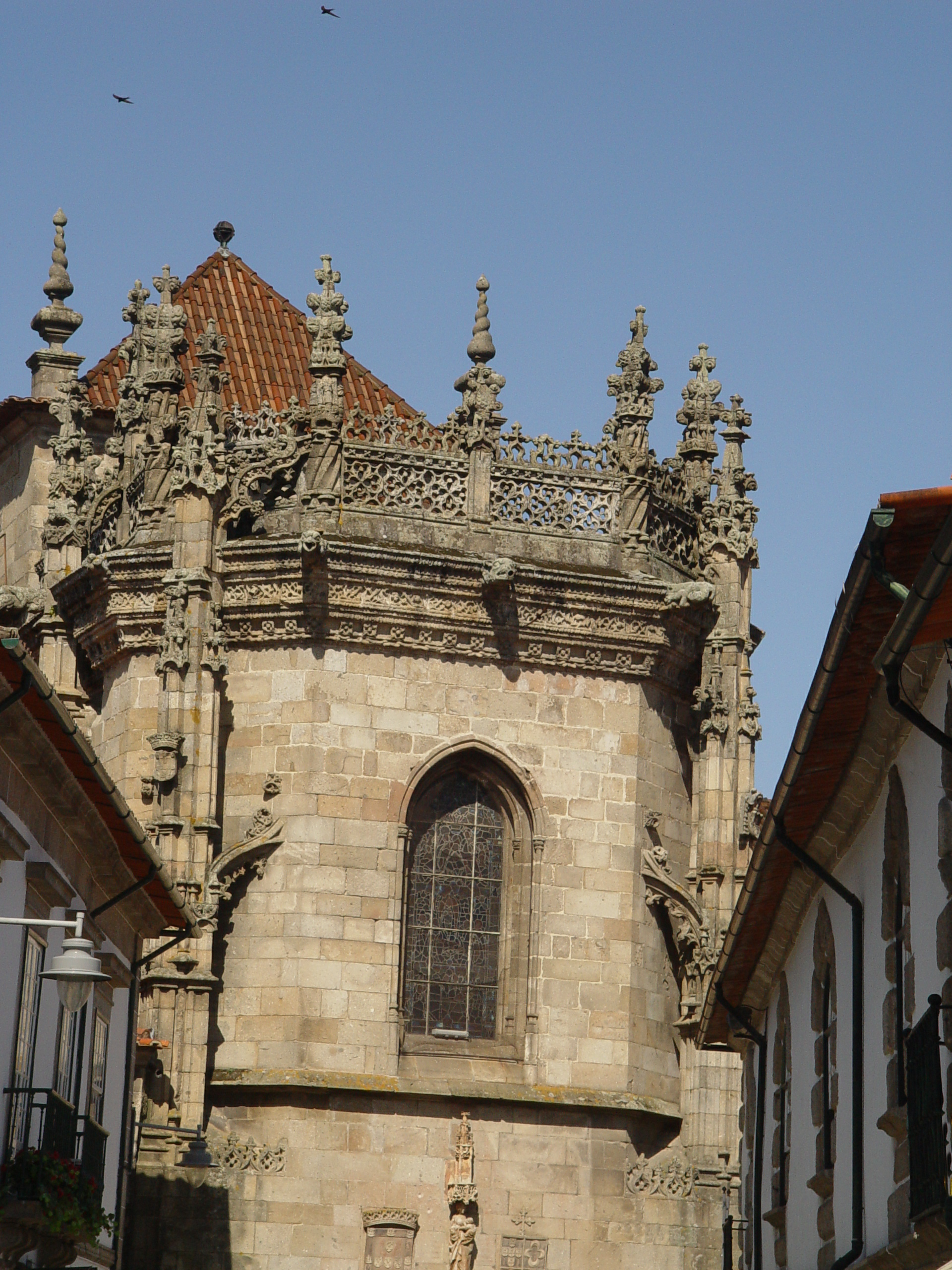
View of the main chapel of the Cathedral of Braga, built in manueline style in the early 16th century. Under the window there is a Madonna with the Child under a gothic canopy between the coat-of-arms of Portugal (left) and that of Archbishop Diogo de Sousa (right).

View of the South side of Braga Cathedral. The portal in the lateral façade is original Romanesque.

The original romanesque Western façade of the Cathedral of Braga has been totally suppressed, except for some archivolts and capitals of the main portal, heavily decorated with animal and human sculptured reliefs. The figures of one archivolt, with hens, foxes and a minstrel, may be telling a moralistic song like the Roman de Renart, of French tradition.

Between 1486 and 1501, an entrance gallery (a galilee) in late gothic style was built preceding the main portal. The galilee has ribbed vaulting and is decorated with statues and gargoyles, the gargoyles were used for spouts so rain wouldn't ruin the side of the buildings. The beautiful manueline metal gate was originally in the interior of the cathedral, but was moved to the galilee in the 18th century. In the early 16th century, Archbishop Diogo de Sousa modified the main romanesque portal, sacrificing the inner archivolts. The upper part of the façade and towers were totally modernised in the 18th century and are unremarkable. The Southern façade of the cathedral has an interesting romanesque portal.

Notable is the main chapel of the apse, rebuilt in 1509 under Archbishop Diogo de Sousa by basque architect João de Castilho. The exterior of the chapel has beautiful late gothic and manueline tracery with gargoyles and pinnacles, matched in the interior of the chapel by intricate ribbed vaulting. The outer wall of the main chapel has a beautiful early-16th century statue of the Madonna breastfeeding Jesus (Madona do Leite) between the coat of arms of Portugal and Bishop Diogo de Sousa, sponsor of the manueline renovation.

=== Interior ===
The Chapel of Nossa Senhora do Sameiro, with walls decorated with azulejo tiles depicting religious events

Braga Cathedral has three aisles covered by a wooden roof, a transept and five Eastern chapels in the apse. None of the chapels is original romanesque anymore: the main chapel is manueline, while the others are heavily decorated in baroque style. In the North wall outside of the cathedral there is a small chapel, of early romanesque design, that may be a remnant of the late 11th building. This chapel was left outside of the final cathedral, perhaps due to a change of design in the 12th century.

The nave is essentially romanesque thanks to a "purifying" reform in the 20th century that suppressed most later additions, although most original capitals of the columns have been lost. D. Afonso, son of King John I, is buried in a 15th-century tomb made of bronze, which can be seen in the nave of the cathedral.

A high choir was added near the entrance of the cathedral in the baroque period. This choir is beautifully decorated with a painted ceiling and sculptured gilt wood (talha dourada) choir stalls executed around 1737 by Miguel Francisco da Silva. In front of the high choir there are two gilt wood organs, carved by renowned sculptor Marceliano de Araújo in the 1730s, heavily decorated with baroque and fantastic motifs. These are among the most impressive gilt wood works in Portugal.

The main chapel is roofed with stone rib vaulting and its walls are decorated with a 14th-century statue of the Virgin Mary (Nossa Senhora de Braga). During the remodelling of the chapel, Archbishop Diogo de Sousa also commissioned a stone altar, but most of it has been lost. The part still preserved is used as altar table and has beautiful reliefs of Christ and the Apostles. The choir stalls are neogothic.

The other chapels of the apse are decorated in baroque or neoclassical styles. The chapel of Saint Peter of Rates is particularly interesting, being decorated with typical blue-white tiles that tell the life of the saint. The author of the tiles is António de Oliveira Bernardes, one of the main 18th century-Portuguese tile painter.

Several chapels were built adjacent to the cathedral in the Middle Ages. The Chapel of the Kings (Capela dos Reis) was built around 1374 in the place where Count Henrique and Countess Theresa, parents of the first Portuguese King, were buried. Their tombs were substituted in the early 16th century by new ones, with recumbent figures.

The gothic Chapel of the Glory (Capela da Glória) was built between 1326 and 1348 to be the resting place for Archbishop Gonçalo Pereira. He commissioned a magnificent tomb for himself to sculptors Master Pero, an Aragonese, and Telo Garcia, a Portuguese. The tomb, guarded by six stone lions, has the life-size statue of the archbishop, with his head resting over a pillow held by angels. The sides of the tomb are decorated with images of the apostles and clergymen. In the early 16th century the chapel was painted with interesting geometrical motifs of Moorish influence, very similar to Sevillian tiles.

Near the cloisters is located the Chapel of Piety (Capela da Piedade) built by Archbishop Diogo de Sousa around 1513. He is buried in the chapel in a beautiful Renaissance tomb.

Upper level of the cloister of Braga Cathedral

The cloisters were rebuilt in the 19th century and are of little artistic interest, but the Cathedral Museum keeps many interesting items. These include the magnificent manueline chalice of Archbishop Diogo de Sousa (early 16th century), the chalice of Saint Gerald (10th century) and an Arab ivory box (11th century), among others.

== Personalities ==
Important people related to Braga Cathedral include:

- Saint Peter of Rates (São Pedro de Rates): According to legend, was first bishop of Braga between 45 and 60, appointed by Apostle Saint James the Great. His remains are supposedly kept in a chapel of the cathedral.
- Saint Martin of Braga (c.520–580): Bishop of Braga in the 6th century. Converted the Sueves to mainstream Christianity.
- Paulus Orosius (375–418): Born in Bracara Augusta, he was a Gallaecian Chalcedonian priest, historian and theologian, a student of Augustine of Hippo.
- Henry, Count of Portugal (1066–1112): Henry was Count of Portugal from 1093 up to his death. He turned Braga into his capital and promoted the building of the cathedral. He is buried in a 16th-century tomb in the Chapel of the Kings.
- Theresa, Countess and Queen of Portugal (1080–1130): Theresa of León was married to Count Henry in 1094. Her 16th-century tomb is also located in the Chapel of the Kings.
- Antipope Gregory VIII (died 1137): Maurice Bourdin (Maurício Burdino) was the second Archbishop of Braga. Of French origin, helped organise the diocese. He was involved in a dispute between Germanic Emperor Henry V and the Pope Gelasius II, and was elected Antipope as Gregory VIII by the Emperor's followers, he was later imprisoned by Pope Calixtus II and died in an Italian convent.
- Pope John XXI (c.1215–1277): Born in Lisbon as Pedro Julião, was Archbishop of Braga in the 13th century. Elected Pope in 1276.
- Archbishop D. Diogo de Sousa (c.1461–1532): Archbishop of Braga between 1505 and 1532, modernised both the city and the cathedral. Buried in the Chapel of Piety.
- Saint Ovidius (martyred 135 A.D.): third Bishop of Braga, buried in the cathedral.
- Crown Prince D. Afonso (1390–1400): Presumed heir to the throne of Portugal, son of John I and Philippa of Lancaster. Died in Braga and was buried in a mausoleum in Braga Cathedral, inside the central church, on the right from the main portal.
- Archbishop D. Paio Mendes (?–1137): was the Archbishop of Braga from 1118 until his death. He was an adherent of the cause of Afonso Henriques, Count of Portugal.
- Archbishop D. Lourenço Vicente (?–1398): was an archbishop of Braga and defender of John I, participated in the Battle of Aljubarrota, where he was given a scar in his face, and in the retaking of Guimarães. He is buried in the Chapel of the Kings, where his naturally mummified body is displayed.

== Chronology ==
- 11th century – Construction of an episcopal church under the initiative of Bishop D. Pedro (1070–1091), on the remains of a large Roman building and another from the High Middle Ages;
- 1089 – Sacrifice of the same by Bernardo de Sedirac, archbishop of Toledo;
- 1096/1108 – construction of the Chapel of S. Geraldo;
- 1118/1137 – beginning of the reconstruction of the Cathedral under the initiative of Archbishop D. Paio Mendes;
- 1135 – Towers collapsed due to an earthquake;
- 1210 – D. Sancho I bequeathed to the Cathedral 2 thousand Morabitinos;
- 1212/1228 – Repairs to the sacristy and cloister and reconstruction of the Chapel of S. Geraldo;
- 1326/1348 – D. Gonçalo Pereira orders the construction of the tomb chapel, known as the Chapel of Glory, next to that of S. Geraldo, as well as painting the choir;
- 1374 – D. Lourenço Vicente orders a chapel to be built, next to the north wall of the cathedral, at the place where the Count D. Henrique and D. Teresa were buried;
- 15th century – Date of the tomb of the infant D. Afonso de Portugal, son of D. João I;
- 1416/1467 – D. Fernando da Guerra endowed and restored the Library, as well as the Chapel of S. Geraldo;
- 1486/1501 – Galilee construction;
- 1505/1532 – Archbishop D. Diogo de Sousa improves the axial portal, removing 2 arches and the mainel; reconstruction of the chancel, under the design of João de Castilho; construction of an ançã stone altarpiece; restoration of towers; reconstruction of the cloister; restoration of the Chapel of S. Geraldo;
- 1513 – Construction of the chapel of Jesus of Mercy (N. Sra. Da Piedade);
- 17th century – Construction of the large sacristy;
- 1704/1728 – Reform ordered by D. Rodrigo de Moura Teles; remodeling of the side chapels; remodeling of the Chapel of S. Geraldo; gilding application; execution of windows for greater light entry; execution of a dome on the cruise and a dome next to the high choir; renovation of the two towers on the facade;
- 1721 – Transfer of the chancel to the galilee;
- 1737 – Date of the ecclesiastical chairs;
- 1737/1738 – Construction of the organs by Frei Simon Fontanes with the collaboration of Marceliano de Araújo;
- 1755 – An earthquake causes cracks in the towers;
- 1758/1789 – works in the cloister; destruction of the chancel retable;
- 1930 – Creation of the Sacred Art Museum.

== See also ==
- Ecclesiastical history of Braga

== Gallery ==
Nave looking toward the chancel

High choir with two gilded pipe organs

Chancel with the Gothic altar frontal and carved choir stalls

Side view of the carved choir stalls in the chancel

16th-century Gothic high altar frontal by Machim

Tomb of Afonso of Portugal with a bronze effigy and canopy
