= Theresa, Countess of Portugal =

11/12th-century Countess and disputed Queen of Portugal

Theresa
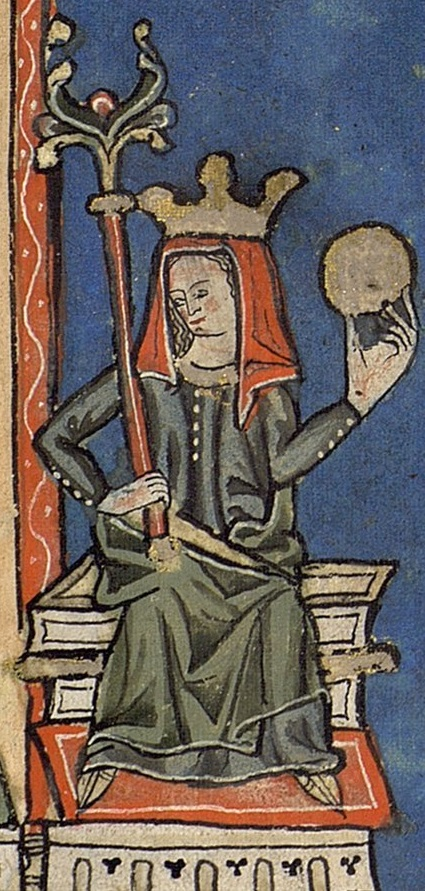
- Miniature, 13th century

Countess of Portugal
- Reign: 1096 – 24 June 1128
- Successor: Afonso
- Co-ruler: Henry (1096–1112); Afonso (1112–1128)

Queen of Portugal
- Reign: 1116 – 24 June 1128
- Successor: Afonso I (from 1139)
- Born: c. 1080
- Died: 11 November 1130; Monastery of Montederramo, Ourense, Galicia
- Burial: Braga Cathedral, Braga, Portugal
- Spouse: Henry of Burgundy
- Issue Among others...: Urraca Henriques; Afonso I of Portugal; Teresa, Queen of León; (ill.)
- House: Jiménez
- Father: Alfonso VI of León
- Mother: Jimena Muñoz

Theresa (Portuguese: Teresa; Galician-Portuguese: Tareja or Tareixa; Latin: Theresia) (c. 1080 – 11 November 1130) was Countess of Portugal, and for a time claimant to be its independent Queen. She rebelled against her half-sister Queen Urraca of León. She was recognised as Queen by Pope Paschal II in 1116, but was captured and forced to accept Portugal's vassalage to León in 1121, being allowed to keep her royal title. Her political alliance and amorous liaison with Galician nobleman Fernando Pérez de Traba led to her being ousted by her son, Afonso Henriques, who with the support of the Portuguese nobility and clergy, defeated her at the Battle of São Mamede in 1128.

== Birth and marriage ==
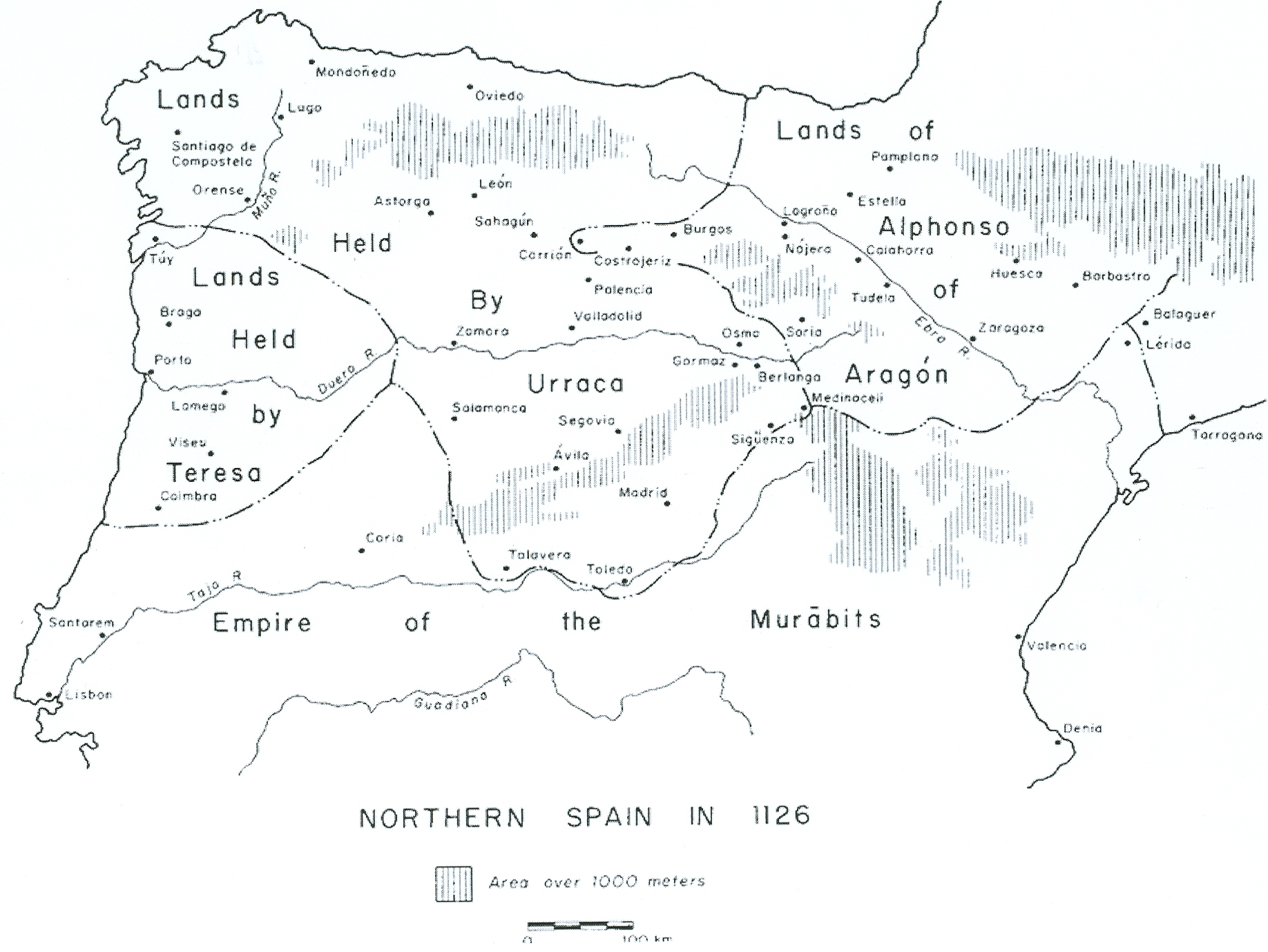
Political map of the north part of the Iberian peninsula in the year 1126

Theresa was the illegitimate daughter of King Alfonso VI of León by Jimena Muñoz. In 1093, her father married her to a French nobleman, Henry of Burgundy, who was a nephew of Queen Constance, a brother of the Duke of Burgundy, and a descendant of the kings of France in the male line. Henry was providing military assistance to his father-in-law against the Muslims on the Portuguese march.

Between the years 1096 and 1105, Henry and his cousin Raymond of Burgundy, husband of Queen Urraca, reached an agreement whereby each swore under oath that Raymond would give Henry the kingdom of Toledo and one-third of the royal treasury after King Alfonso's death and, if that was not possible, Henry would receive the kingdom of Galicia, while Henry, in turn, promised to support his cousin Raymond in securing all of the king's dominions and two-thirds of the treasury.

Alfonso VI had entrusted Theresa and Henry with the county of Portugal in 1096. Historians who date the pact closer to 1096 hypothesize that King Alfonso, after becoming aware of this covenant, appointed Henry governor of all the land between the Minho River and Santarém, governed until then by Raymond, thereby limiting his son-in-law's government to Galicia. The two cousins then, instead of being allies, would have become rivals, each vying to obtain the king's favor.

Other historians, however, have shown that the pact could not have been made before 1103, several years after the two counts had been granted their respective title, with Henry's appointment answering the need for military command in the southwest.

Upon the death of King Alfonso, Henry and Theresa continued governing these lands south of the Minho and extending to the Mondego river and valley, and, later, in December 1111, under the reign of Queen Urraca, were also governing Zamora.

== Reign ==
=== Struggle with sister ===
At first, Theresa and Henry were vassals of her father, but Alfonso VI died in 1109, leaving his legitimate daughter, Queen Urraca of Léon as the heir to the throne. As a daughter Theresa could be a vector of royal authority, so as a wife she bestowed that authority to her husband and then as a widow it was accepted that she might continue to exercise authority on behalf of her male children. Both women, Countess Theresa and Queen Urraca, ruled alone after the deaths of their immigrant husbands, ostensibly in defence of their young children, but also in their own right.

Henry invaded León, hoping to add it to his lands. When he died in 1112, Theresa was left to deal with the military and political situation. She took on the responsibility of government, and occupied herself at first mainly with her southern lands, that had only recently been reconquered from the Moors as far as the Mondego River. In recognizing her victory in defending Coimbra, she was called "Queen" by Pope Paschal II and in light of this recognition, she appears in her documents as "Daughter of Alphonso and elected by God", explicitly being called queen in an 1117 document, leading some to refer to her as the first monarch of Portugal. Pope Paschal II referred to her as queen in the papal bull FRATRUM NOSTRUM issued on 18 June 1116.

In 1116, in an effort to expand her power, Theresa fought her half-sister, Queen Urraca. They fought again in 1120, as she continued to pursue a larger share in the Leonese inheritance, and allied herself as a widow to the most powerful Galician nobleman for that effect. This was Fernando Pérez, Count of Traba, who had rejected his first wife to openly marry her, and served her on her southern border of the Mondego. In 1121, she was besieged and captured at Lanhoso, on her northern border with Galicia, while fighting her sister Urraca. A negotiated peace (Treaty of Lanhoso) was coordinated with aid from the Archbishops of Santiago de Compostela and Braga. The terms included that Theresa could go free only if she held the County of Portugal as a vassal of the Kingdom of León as she had received it initially.

=== Rebellions ===
By 1128, the Archbishop of Braga and the main Portuguese feudal nobles had had enough of her persistent Galician alliance, which the first feared could favour the ecclesiastical pretensions of his new rival, the Galician Archbishop of Santiago de Compostela, Diego Gelmírez, who had just started to assert his pretensions to an alleged discovery of relics of Saint James in his town, as his way to gain power and riches over the other cathedrals in the Iberian Peninsula.

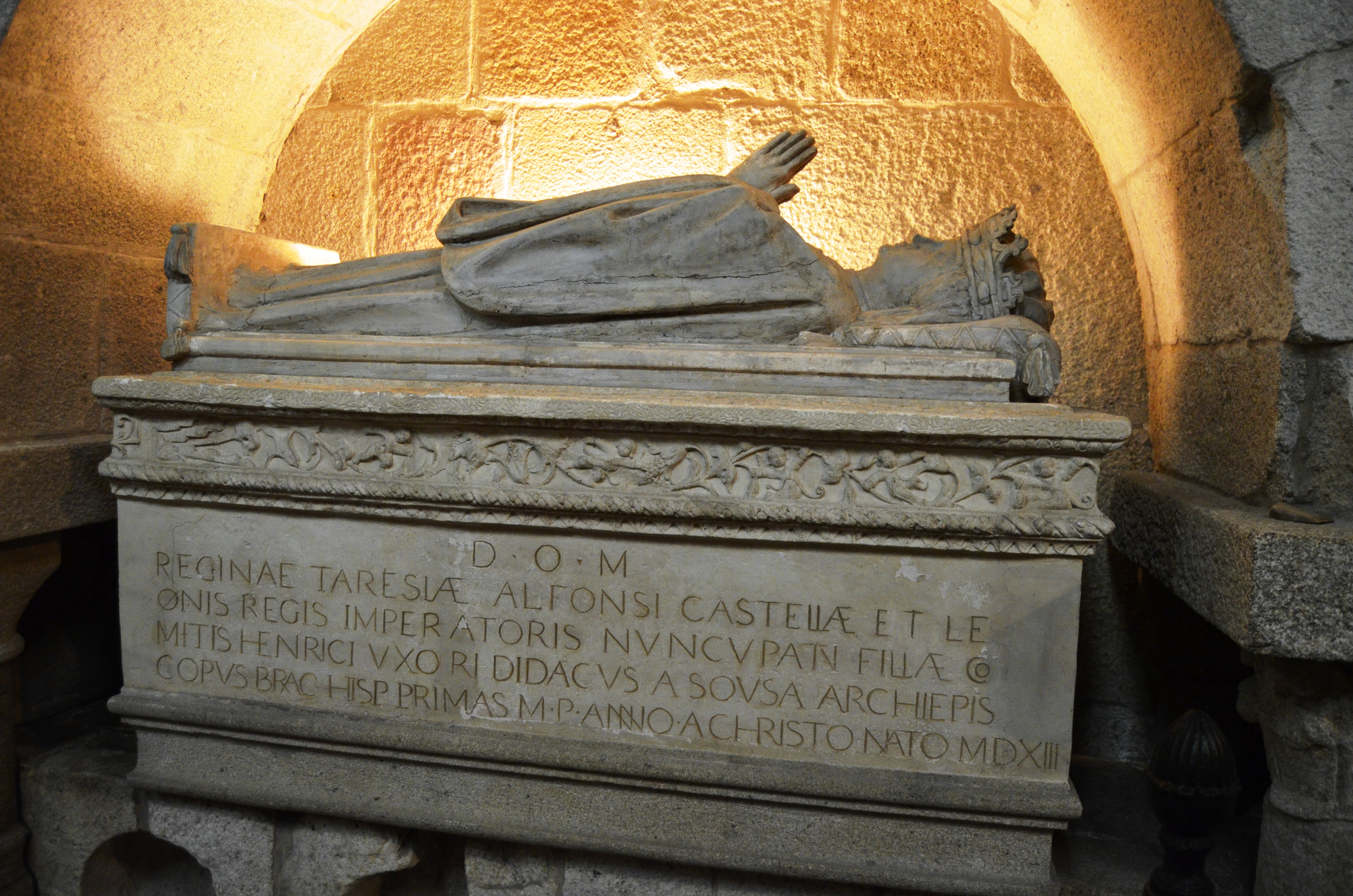
Tomb of Theresa, Countess-Queen of Portugal, at Braga Cathedral.

The Portuguese nobles and warlords rebelled, and the Queen was deposed after a short civil war. Her son and heir, Afonso, defeated Theresa's troops at the Battle of São Mamede near Guimarães and led her, along with the Count of Traba and their children, into exile in the Kingdom of Galicia, near the Portuguese border, where the Traba had founded the monastery of Toxos Outos. Theresa died soon afterwards in 1130. She was succeeded by her son, who would eventually lead Portugal into becoming a fully independent kingdom, and, later, nation state.

== Issue ==
By Henry, Count of Portugal, Theresa had:

- Urraca Henriques (c. 1095/1097 – c. 1173), wife of Bermudo Pérez de Traba, son of count Pedro Fróilaz, tenente in Trastámara, Viseu, Seia, and Faro in A Coruña, with issue;
- Sancha Henriques (c. 1097–1163), married firstly Sancho Nunes de Celanova, with issue. After being widowed, married secondly Fernando Mendes de Bragança, without any issue from this marriage;
- Teresa Henriques (born c. 1098);
- Afonso Henriques (1109–1185), the first king of Portugal, named after his maternal grandfather, perhaps as "a reminder that the blood of the Emperor of all Hispania also ran through the veins of this grandson".

She had two daughters with count Fernando Pérez de Traba:

- Teresa Fernández de Traba (d. 1180) wife of count Nuño Pérez de Lara and, when widowed, the second wife of King Ferdinand II of León;
- Sancha Fernández de Traba (d. after March 1181). Married before 1150 count Álvaro Rodríguez de Sarria, with issue. After being widowed, she became the second wife of count Pedro Alfonso and, widowed again, married count Gonzalo Ruiz; without any issue from these two marriages.

== See also ==
- Siege of Coimbra (1117)
- Portugal in the Middle Ages
  - Portugal in the Reconquista

== Bibliography ==
- David, Pierre (1948). "La pacte succesoral entre Raymond de Galice et Henri de Portugal". Bulletin Hispanique (in French). 50 (3): 275–290. doi:10.3406/hispa.1948.3146.
- Disney, A. R. (2009). A History of Portugal and the Portuguese Empire. From Beginnings to 1807. Vol. I: Portugal. Cambridge University Press. ISBN 978-0-521-60397-3.
- Bishko, Charles J. (1971). "Count Henrique of Portugal, Cluny, and the antecedents of the Pacto Sucessório". Revista Portuguesa de Historia. 13 (13): 155–188. doi:10.14195/0870-4147_13_8.
- López Morán, Enriqueta (2005). "El monacato femenino gallego en la Alta Edad Media (Lugo y Orense) (Siglos XIII al XV)" (PDF). Nalgures. No. II. A Coruña: Asociación Cultura de Estudios Históricos de Galicia. pp. 49–142 (vid pp. 88–89). ISSN 1885-6349.
- López-Sangil, José Luis (2002). La nobleza altomedieval gallega, la familia Froílaz-Traba. La Coruña: Toxosoutos, S.L. ISBN 84-95622-68-8.
- Manrique, Ángel (1649). Anales cistercienses. Vol. II.
- Martínez Díez, Gonzalo (2003). Alfonso VI: Señor del Cid, conquistador de Toledo. Madrid: Temas de Hoy, S.A. ISBN 84-8460-251-6.
- Mattoso, José (2014). D. Afonso Henriques (in Portuguese) (2nd ed.). Lisbon: Temas e Debates. ISBN 978-972-759-911-0.
- Reilly, Bernard F. (1993). The Medieval Spains. Cambridge University Press. ISBN 978-0-521-39741-4.
- Rodrigues Oliveira, Ana (2010). Rainhas medievais de Portugal. Dezassete mulheres, duas dinastias, quatro séculos de História (in Portuguese). Lisbon: A esfera dos livros. ISBN 978-989-626-261-7.
- Sotto Mayor Pizarro, José Augusto (2007). "O regime senhorial na frontera do nordeste português. Alto Douro e Riba Côa (Séculos XI–XIII)". Hispania. Revista Española de Historia. Vol. LXVII, no. 227. Madrid: Instituto de Historia "Jerónimo Zurita"; Centro de Estudios Históricos. pp. 849–880. ISSN 0018-2141.
- Torres Sevilla-Quiñones de León, Margarita Cecilia (1999). Linajes nobiliarios de León y Castilla: Siglos IX–XIII. Salamanca: Junta de Castilla y León, Consejería de educación y cultura. ISBN 84-7846-781-5.

Theresa, Countess of Portugal House of Jiménez Born: c. 1080 Died: 11 November 1130
Regnal titles
New title	Countess of Portugal; 1096–1128 with Henry (1096–1112); Afonso (1112–1128)	Succeeded by Afonso
