= Monastery of San Xusto =

Monastery in Galicia, Spain

- Mosteiro dos Santos Xusto e Pastor de Toxos Outos
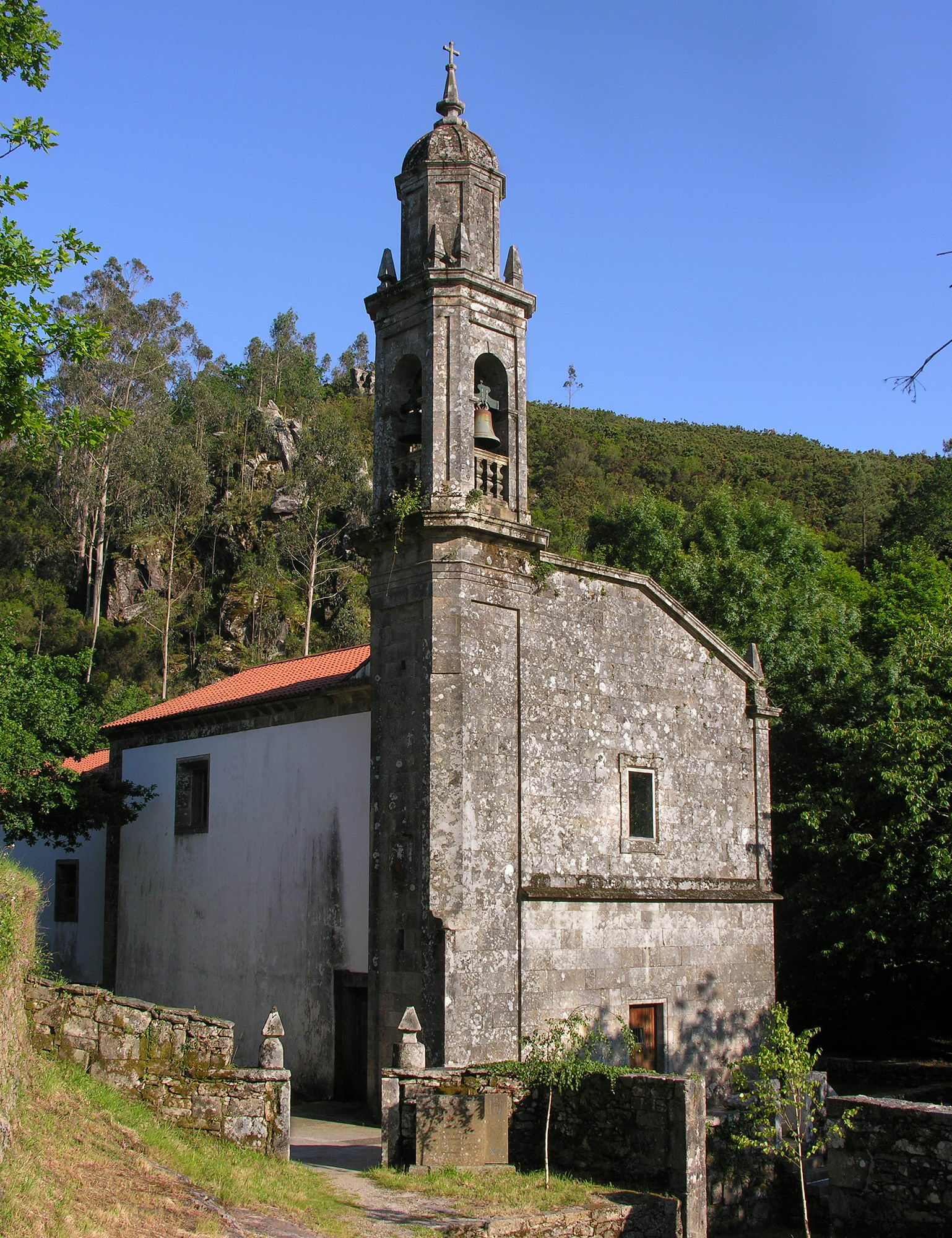
- The monastery in 2007

- Location within Spain

Religion
- Affiliation: Catholic

Location
- Location: San Xusto, Galicia
- Country: Spain
- Coordinates: 42°48′42″N 8°49′11″W

Architecture
- Style: Baroque

The Monastery of San Xusto (Galician: Mosteiro dos Santos Xusto e Pastor de Toxos Outos), is an old Spanish monastery, today abandoned, in San Xusto, in the municipality of Lousame.

According to Hipólito de Sa

his property included part of the Mahia, inland, and along the coast from Noya to Finisterre, he owned some small enclaves in the lands of Rivadavia, Salnés Morrazo and in Portugal, the town of Paredes...

== History ==
It was founded on 1 November 1129, after the donation of the hermitage of San Xusto to Froila Alonso and Pedro Muniz de Carnota by the Monastery of Saint Pelagius of Antealtares on 16 October 1127. In 1135 it was consecrated by the archbishop Xelmírez. Afonso VII favoured it and exempted it from the tributes due to the Compostela church, the monastery also enjoyed the protection of the family of the Counts of Traba. Its possessions included Noia, Lousame, Outes, Muros and also 47 churches and 17 municipalities. It had 22 abbots between 1135 and 1498.

Following the monastic reform carried out by the Catholic Monarchs, the bishop of Tui, Diego de Muros, ordered the monastery to join the Sobrado Abbey in 1475, so that it was incorporated into the same in 1504, and became part of the Cistercian order.

It recovered part of its splendour and decorations during the 17th and 18th centuries, but these disappeared due to the Napoleonic invasions and the confiscation of Mendizábal.

In 1921, the priest of the parish, with the authorisation of the archdiocese of Santiago de Compostela, sold the remains of the Romanesque cloister, from the 13th century, to the viscount of San Alberto, who installed it in Pazo da Pena do Ouro, near Noia.

In the 12th century, the Tombo de Toxos Outos, a manuscript famous for its miniatures, was written there.

== Bibliography ==
- Agrafoxo Pérez, X.: Noia, vila histórica. Lousame, 1987: Colexio Público, D.L. ISBN 84-398-9361-X
