= Menendo González =

Count of Portugal from 997 to 1008

- Dux Domnus

Count of Portucale
- Tenure: c. 997–1008
- Predecessor: Gonzalo Menéndez
- Successor: Alvito Nunes
- Died: 6 October 1008
- Spouse: Tutadona Moniz (Toda)
- Issue: Rodrigo Menéndez Gonzalo Menéndez; Pelayo Menéndez; Ramiro Menéndez; Egas Menéndez; Munio Menéndez; Elvira Menéndez; Ilduara Menéndez Ildoncia (Eldonza) Menéndez
- Father: Gonzalo Menéndez
- Mother: Ilduara Peláez

Menendo González (Portuguese and Galician: Mendo Gonçalves; (Note: Mentioned on 13 September 1005 in the monastery of Celanova, as dux Menindus Gunsaluis.) died 6 October 1008) was a semi-autonomous Duke of Galicia (Note: The title (dux de Galicia in medieval Latin) comes from posthumous charters. He is also sometimes referred to as Menendo González II or Mendo II Gonçalves to distinguish him from his grandfather, Hermenegildo González, since the name Mendo/Menendo/Menendus is derived from Hermenegild/Hermenegildo/Hermenegildus.) and Count of Portugal (997–1008), a dominant figure in the Kingdom of León. He was the royal alférez, the king's armour-bearer (armiger regis) and commander of the royal armies, under Vermudo II (r. 984–999), and he continued to hold the position until his death. He became the tutor (1003) and ultimately father-in-law of Vermudo's successor, King Alfonso V. He maintained peaceful diplomatic relations with the Caliphate of Córdoba until 1004, after which there was a state of war.

== Regency of Alfonso V ==
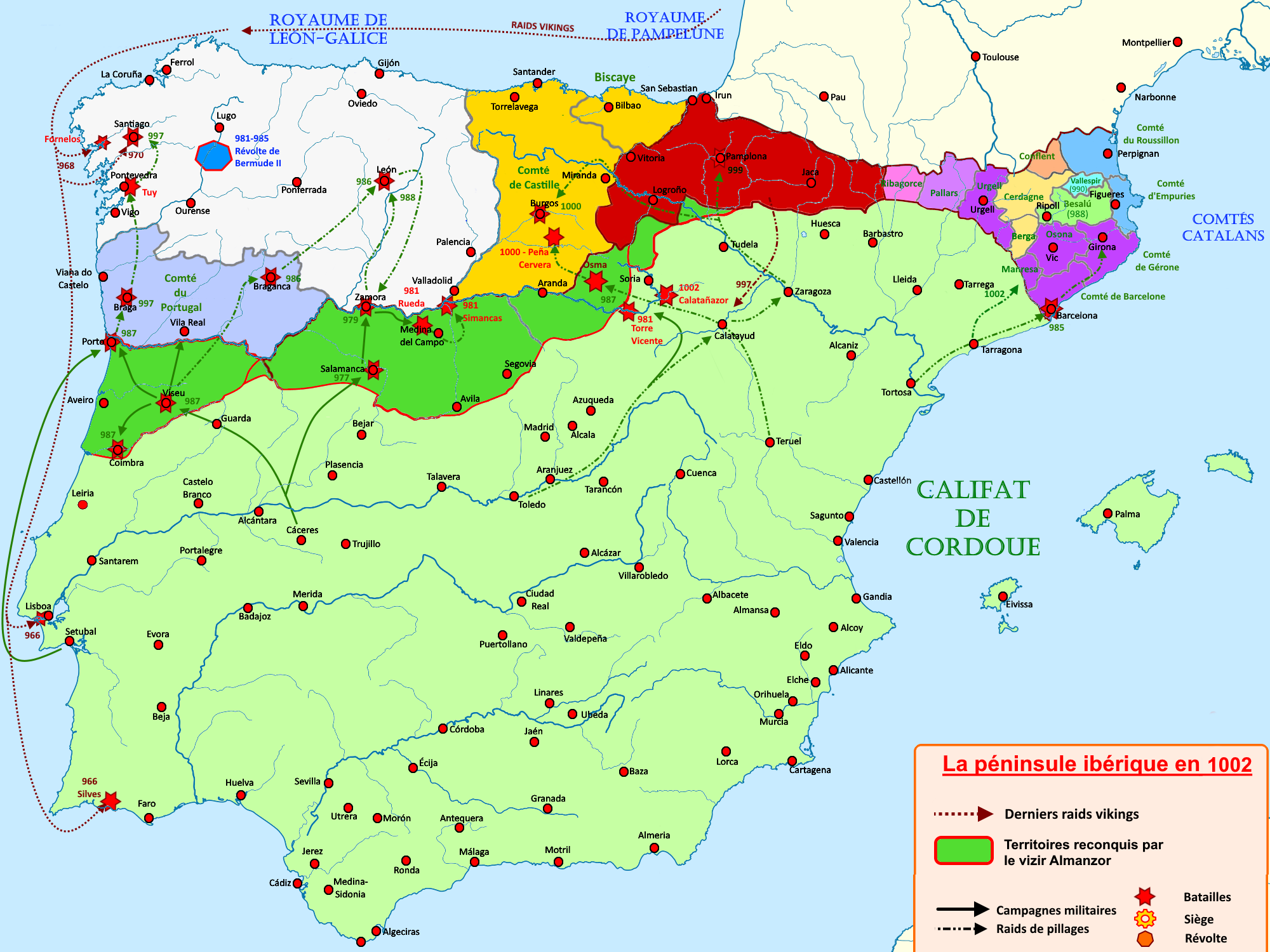
Iberian Peninsula in 1002 showing the County of Portugal

Before 999, Vermudo II placed his heir, Alfonso V, under the tutorship of his alférez Menendo. Alfonso was only five at his father's death (September 999) and he spent the early years of his reign in the care of Menendo and his wife. The earliest act of Alfonso as king dates to 13 October 999, and it lists as confirmants first Count Menendo González ("Menendus Gundisaluiz, comes") and then "Duke" Sancho García of Castile ("Santius, dux, Garsea prolis"). Menendo, too, appears in contemporary documents with the ducal title, as in "Lord Duke Menendo, son of Gonzalo" ("dux domnus Menendus proles Gundisalvi").

Until 1003, the young Alfonso always appears in his official acts with his mother, Elvira García, a sister of the count of Castile, beside him. Possibly she was exercising the regency under her brother's influence.

In 1000, Menendo witnessed the king's confirmation of the testament of Hilal, called Salvatus, the Mozarabic abbot of San Cipriano de Valdesalce, after the queen-regent Elvira and before five bishops of the realm. A charter dated 23 December 1001 records the settlement of a dispute concerning the monastery of Celanova by Alfonso V and "his elder, the lord Menendo, son of Gonzalo" ("senatus sui domni Ermenagildi Gundisaluiz prolis"). Another charter dated 11 January 1002 records the donation of San Andrés de Congostro to the monastery of Celanova and was confirmed by Duke Menendo.

After 1003, Elvira no longer appears in royal charters; she may have been removed in a palace coup by Menendo. In subscribing one royal act Menendo went so far as to call himself "he who under the authority of the aforementioned king ordains and guides all things" ("qui sub imperio iam dicti regis hec omnia ordinavit et docuit").

In 1004, Sancho challenged the regency of Menendo. Both counts petitioned the Córdoban hajib Abd al-Malik to arbitrate the dispute. According to Ibn Khaldun, a hearing took place and Abd al-Malik's deputy, the judge (qadi) of the Mozarabic community of Córdoba, Asbag bin Abd Allah bin Nabil, found in favour of Menendo. According to some sources this took place in Córdoba with the two disputant counts in attendance, but according to others it took place in León.

A royal charter of 1007 gives the king's recognition to the power of Menendo in Galicia. In it he is called "the great count who holds all the land of Galicia" (comes magnus ... omnem terram Gallecie ... obtinebat).

== Relations with Córdoba ==
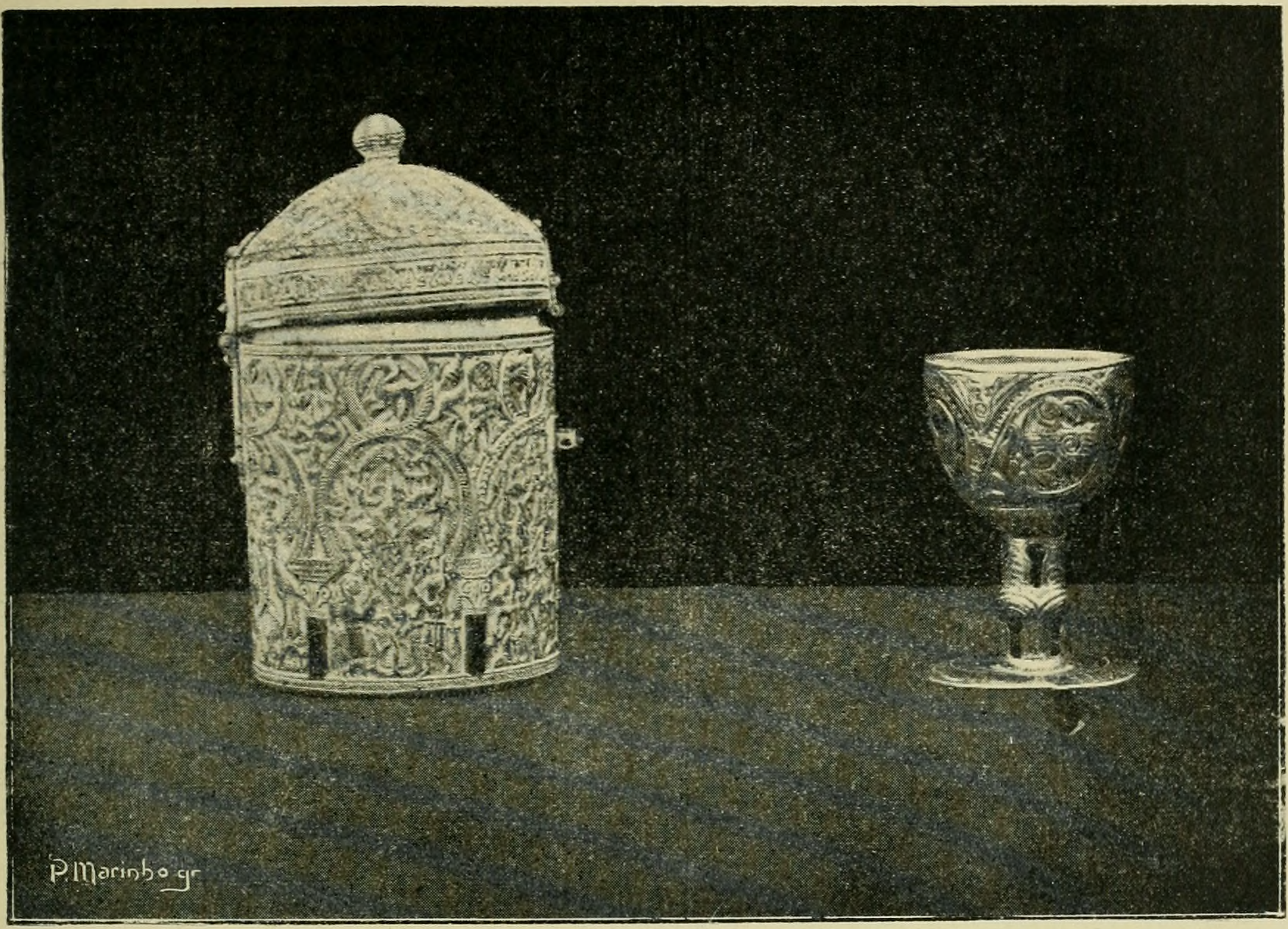
Ivory pyxis with chalice once owned by Menendo González, now in the museum of the cathedral of Braga.

Menendo did not initially collaborate with Córdoba, but after contingents were sent from Córdoba to reinforce Coimbra and the frontier with Portugal, Menendo entered into a pact with Abd al-Malik. This included a clause calling for military collaboration in 1003. That year Leonese and Castilian troops assisted Córdoba in an attack on Catalonia. This pact seems to have been broken in 1005, when a Córdoban army marched on the Leonese kingdom with the intent of taking Zamora. The city was not captured, but a large territory was seized. For the remainder of Menendo's regency there was no peace with Córdoba.

A pyxis once owned by Menendo González and now in the museum of the cathedral of Braga provides further evidence of his relations with Córdoba. The ivory pyxis with chalice and silver paten, has an inscription on the rim of its lid which allows it to be dated to between 1004, when the hajib Abd al-Malik received the title he bears in the inscription, Sayf al-Dawla ("sword of the state"), and 1007, when he received the higher title of al-Muzaffar ("the victorious"). (Note: The hajib died in battle in 1008. The inscription on the lid reads: "In the name of God. Blessings from God, prosperity and happiness to the hajib Sayf al-Dawla, may God increase his glory. From among what was ordered to be made under the supervision of the chief page [Zuhayr ibn Muhammad] al-Amiri.")

The pyxis was acquired by Menendo before his death, since an inscription to the bottom relates its donation to the church by him and his wife, Toda. (Note: It reads: IN N[omi]NE D[omi]NI MENENDUS GUNDISALVI ET TUDAD[o]MNA SUM, "in the name of Lord Menendo González and Lady Toda I am".) The chalice and paten, which are contemporary, appear to be made to fit the pyxis and were possibly commissioned by Menendo. How he obtained the pyxis is unknown. He may have taken it as booty during a campaign against Córdoba, or received it as a gift from the court of Córdoba to the Leonese regent during diplomatic negotiations. The historian Serafín Moralejo suggests it may have been presented to Menendo by Asbagh the qadi as "a good-will gift ... a bitter one indeed and a warning, too, since the title of Sayf al-Dawla carved on its lid commemorated the raid the hajib had launched on León one year earlier." (Note: Quoted in Prado-Vilar, 34. A warning because, as Moralejo notes, "León was to experience a further Muslim attack in the following year".) The iconography of the pyxis might indicate its function as a diplomatic gift. (Note: The iconography of the pyxis is peaceful, and its original function could have been at a "marriage, or an occasion of a calendrical observance such as a summer of fall harvest festival". The carvings of birds eating fruit may imitate a well-used Christian eucharistic motif dating back to Visigothic times. If so, the piece may have been designed to serve as a diplomatic gift to a Christian ruler, perhaps Menendo.)

== Violent death ==
The last recorded act of Menendo was to confirm a charter of the monastery of San Pedro de Rocas in 1007. He was mentioned in a lawsuit settled in favour of Count Munio Fernández in early 1008, but as he did not confirm the result it is probable that he was away from court in Galicia. Eight months later, on 6 October 1008, he died a violent death in unclear circumstances. Ibn Khaldun, dating his death by the anno Hegirae, places it between 17 September 1007 and 4 September 1008, but the date provided by the Chronicon Lusitanum is more reliable. It records that "in the year 1046 of the Spanish era, on the day preceding the nones of October, Count Menendo was killed."

The wording of both Ibn Khaldun and the Chronicon suggests that Menendo died violently, probably assassinated. Count Munio has been suspected of arranging his assassination in order to usurp the regency. If so, he was foiled by the queen-mother, Elvira García, who proclaimed the fourteen-year-old Alfonso V to be of age to assume the responsibilities of government. Around 1013, Alfonso married Elvira Menéndez, Gonzalo's daughter. She gave birth to a son, Vermudo III, who succeeded him on the throne, and a daughter, Sancha, who married Count Ferdinand of Castile and passed the Leonese throne on to him. Elvira Menéndez died on 2 December 1022. In 1014 Alfonso V confirmed all the possessions of the monastery of Guimarães, which had been founded by Menendo's grandmother, Mumadona Díaz.

== Viking attack? ==
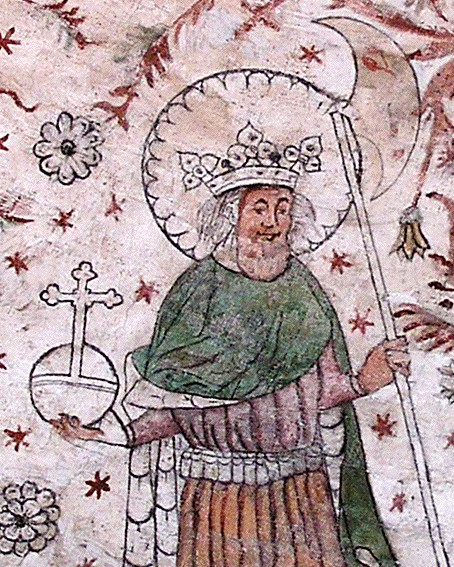
A medieval representation of Olaf Haraldsson.

It has been suggested that Menendo was perhaps killed defending Portugal from a Viking raid. According to the later Icelandic saga Heimskringla, the Vikings under Olaf Haraldsson attacked Gunnvaldsborg, possibly to be identified as a descriptive toponym meaning "city of González" (in Latin *Gundisalvus-burgus) and indicating Tui, which was within Menendo's dukedom and is independently known to have been destroyed by Vikings about this time. There is a Latin document of 1024 that bears the rubric Tudensis sedes post Normannorum vastationem Ecclesiae Divi Jacobi attributa: "the see of Tui was assigned to the church of Santiago after being laid waste by the Northmen". In the words of the Heimskringla:

He [Olaf] conquered the castle called Gunnvaldsborg—it was large and old—and there he captured the earl who was in command there, called Geirfith. Then he had a meeting with the townspeople and imposed a ransom on them for freeing the earl—twelve thousand gold shillings; and that sum was paid by the townspeople as he had demanded. As says Sigvat:

A thirteenth time the Thronders'
thane did win a battle
south in Seljupollarin
sithen, with great carnage,
when to ancient stronghold
early at morn he marched, and
gallant Earl Geirfith of
Gunnvaldsborg made captive.

All the details of this theory—Menendo's death in battle, the identity of Gunnvaldsborg and the timing and place of Olaf's raid—are speculative and have been recently dismissed as unfounded.

== Family relations ==
Menendo González was probably the eldest son and successor of Gonzalo Menéndez and his wife Ilduara Peláez. Menendo's wife is variously known in contemporary sources as Toda, Tota, Todadomna, Tutadomna, Tutadonna, etc. One twelfth-century source calls her Mayor. (Note: Although her parents are unknown she is thought to have been granddaughter of count Fruela Gutiérrez, the brother of Menendo's maternal grandmother Hermesenda and of Saint Rudesind. The principal narrative source for this period in Leonese history is the early twelfth-century chronicler Pelayo of Oviedo, whose brief account of Menendo's regency goes like this: "On the death [of Bermudo II] his son Alfonso, aged five, succeeded to the kingdom in the Era 1037 [AD 999]; and he was brought up by Count Menendo González and his wife the Countess Mayor in Galicia. They gave him their daughter Elvira in marriage, from whom he bore two children, Bermudo and Sancha.")

Menendo had at least six sons and three daughters:

- Rodrigo Menéndez, a direct ancestor in the maternal line of Urraca Fróilaz, wife of Pedro Fróilaz de Traba
- Gonzalo Menéndez (attested 983–1008), is cited with the title of count during his father's lifetime
- Pelayo Menéndez, served as armiger regis in 1012–14
- Ramiro Menéndez (attested 1005–15), served as armiger regis in 1015
- Egas Menéndez (attested 1007–14)
- Munio Menéndez (attested 1007–14)
- Elvira Menéndez, queen of Alfonso V
- Ilduara Menéndez (attested 1025–58), married Nuño Alóitiz, a count in Portugal
- Ildoncia (Eldonza) Menéndez (attested 1014)

== Bibliography ==
=== Secondary sources ===
- Almazán, Vicente (1986). Gallaecia Scandinavica: Introducción ó estudio das relacións galaico/escandinavas durante a Idade Media. Translated by Cidrás Escáneo, Francisco A. Vigo: Galaxia.
- Boehm, Barbara Drake; Little, Charles T. (1993). "Chalice and Paten of San Geraldo; Pyxis of Sayf al-Dawla". Art of Medieval Spain, AD 500–1200. New York: Metropolitan Museum of Art. pp. 148–49, cat. 73.
- Collins, R. J. (2005). "The Spanish Kingdoms". The New Cambridge Medieval History: c. 900–c. 1024. ed. by Timothy Reuter and Rosamond McKitterick. Cambridge: Cambridge University Press. ISBN 9780521362917.
- Collins, R. J. (2014). Caliphs and Kings: Spain, 796–1031. Wiley Blackwell.
- Durany Castrillo, Mercedes; Rodríguez González, María del Carmen (2004). "El obispado de Astorga en el primer tercio del siglo XI: de Jimeno a Sampiro". Semata: Ciencias Sociais e Humanidades (15). Santiago de Compostela: University of Santiago de Compostela: 187–222. hdl:10347/4593. ISSN 1137-9669.
- Fletcher, R. A. (1989). The Quest for El Cid. New York: Knopf. ISBN 9780394574479.
- Hitchcock, Richard (1981). "¿Quiénes fueron los verdaderos mozárabes? Una Contribución a la historia del mozarabismo". Nueva Revista de Filología Hispánica. 30 (2).
- Martínez Díez, Gonzalo (2005). El Condado de Castilla (711–1038): la historia frente a la leyenda (in Spanish). Valladolid. ISBN 84-9718-275-8.
- Martínez Díez, Gonzalo (2007). Sancho III el Mayor Rey de Pamplona, Rex Ibericus (in Spanish). Madrid: Marcial Pons Historia. ISBN 978-84-96467-47-7.
- Mattoso, José (1981). A nobreza medieval portuguesa, a família e o poder (in Portuguese). Lisbon: Editorial Estampa. OCLC 8242615.
- Rosser-Owen, Mariam (1999). "A Córdoban Ivory Pyxis Lid in the Ashmolean Museum". Muqarnas. 16.
- Pallares Méndez, María del Carmen; Portela Silva, Ermelindo (1987). "Elementos para el análisis de la aristocracia alto-medieval de Galicia". Studia historica. Historia Medieval. No. 5. pp. 17–32. ISSN 0213-2060.
- Pires, Helio (2015). "Nem Tui, nem Gibraltar: Óláfr Haraldsson e a Península Ibérica". En la España Medieval. 38: 313–28. doi:10.5209/rev_ELEM.2015.v38.49045.
- Portela, Ermelindo (2015). "The Making of Galicia in Feudal Spain (1065–1157)". In James D'Emilio (ed.). Culture and Society in Medieval Galicia: A Cultural Crossroads at the Edge of Europe. Leiden: Brill. pp. 367–99.
- Prado-Vilar, Francisco (1997). "Circular Visions of Fertility and Punishment: Caliphal Ivory Caskets from Al-Andalus" (PDF). Muqarnas. No. 14, 1. Leiden: E.J. Brill. pp. 19–41. ISSN 0732-2992.
- Reilly, Bernard F. (1988). The Kingdom of León-Castilla Under King Alfonso VI, 1065–1109. Princeton, NJ: Princeton University Press.
- Sánchez Pardo, José Carlos (2010). "Los ataques vikingos y su influencia en la Galicia de los siglos IX–XI" (PDF). Anuario Brigantino. 33: 57–86.
- Torres Sevilla-Quiñones de León, Margarita Cecilia (1999). Linajes nobiliarios de León y Castilla (siglos IX–XIII). Salamanca: Junta de Castilla y León, Consejería de educación y cultura. ISBN 84-7846-781-5.
- Torres Sevilla-Quiñones de León, Margarita Cecilia (1998). "Relaciones fronterizas entre Portugal y León en tiempos de Alfonso VII: El ejemplo de la casa de Traba" (PDF). Revista da Faculdade de Letras. Historia. 15 (1). Porto: Universidade do Porto: 301–12. ISSN 0871-164X.

=== Primary sources ===
- Flórez, Enrique, ed. (1796). "Chronicon Lusitanum". España Sagrada. Vol. XIV. Madrid. p. 417.
- Herculano, Alexandre, ed. (1868). Portugaliae Monumenta Historica: Diplomata et chartae. Vol. I. Lisbon: Olisipone. OCLC 504624362.
- Sáez, Emilio; Sáez, Carlos, eds. (2006). Colección diplomática del Monasterio de Celanova (842–1230). Vol. III (989–1006). Alcalá de Henares: Servicio de Publicaciones, Universidad de Alcalá. ISBN 84-8138-694-4.
- Snorri Sturluson (1991). Hollander, Lee M. (ed.). Heimskringla: History of the Kings of Norway. Austin: University of Texas Press.

Menendo González Betótez family Born: 945 Died: 8 October 1008
Titles of nobility
Preceded by Gonzalo I	Count of Portugal; Duke of Galicia; 997–1008	Succeeded by Alvito
