= Nuno Alvites =

Count of portugal (died 1028)

- Comite Nunus Aloitiz

Count of Portugal
- Tenure: 1017–1028
- Predecessor: Alvito Nunes
- Successor: Mendo Nunes
- Died: 1028
- Spouse: Ilduara Mendes
- Issue: Mendo Nunes, Gontroda Núñez, Munio Nunes
- Father: Alvito Nunes
- Mother: Gontina

Nuno Alvites, also referred to as Nuno or Nuño Aloitiz (Note: He and his wife are documented in 1025 as comite Nunus Aloitiz et uxori eius comitissa domna Ilduara (Count Nuño Aloitez and his wife countess Ilduara).) (fl. 1017 – 1028), was a count of Portugal, a descendant of the first count, Vímara Peres as the son of Count Alvito Nunes and Gontina.

His presence is recorded for the first time in 1017. He appears in 1025 confirming a donation made by King Alfonso V of León to Nuno's brother, Pedro Alvites and again in that same year in another charter in which he states that he succeeded his father Alvito. He ruled the county with his spouse Ilduara Mendes, daughter of earlier count Menendo González, until he was assassinated in 1028, the same year as the death of King Alfonso V. Ilduara continued to rule the county, with her son Mendo, who was still a child, as regent after her husband's death.

== Marriage and issue ==
- Mendo Nunes (or Menendo Núñez), (fl. 1028 – 1050/1053). He governed the country probably as a minor under the regency of his mother and alone as of 1043.
- Gontroda Núñez, whose presence is recorded in medieval sources from 1028 until 1088, was married to Count Vasco. They were the parents of at least one child, count Nuño Velázquez, known in Portuguese sources as Nuno Vasques or Nuno of Celanova. Nuño married Fronilde Sánchez and had several children, including counts Alfonso, Menendo, and Sancho Nunes de Barbosa. (Note: José Mattoso in his 1981 work argued that Gontrodo had no offspring given the generosity with which she distributed her assets. In his 1982 work, however, he mentions that Nuño Velázquez was a first-cousin of Nuno Mendes. Nuño Velázquez's son Sancho was the father of Count Velasco Sánchez.)
- Munio Nunes, who sold a property in Domez before 1031.

== Bibliography ==
- Herculano, Alexandre (1868). Academia de Ciencias de Lisboa (ed.). Portugaliae Monumenta Historica: Diplomata et chartae. Vol. I, Fasc. II. Lisbon: Olisipone. OCLC 504624362.
- Mattoso, José (1981). A nobreza medieval portuguesa, a família e o poder (in Portuguese). Lisbon: Editorial Estampa. OCLC 8242615.
- Mattoso, José (1982). Ricos-homens, infanções e cavaleiros: a nobreza medieval portuguesa nos séculos XI e XII (in Portuguese) (3rd ed.). Lisbon: Guimarães Editores. ISBN 9789726653035.
- Pizarro, José Augusto de Sottomayor (1997). Linhagens Medievais Portuguesas: Genealogias e Estratégias (1279-1325 (in Portuguese). Oporto: Doctorate thesis, author’s edition. hdl:10216/18023.
- Sáez, Emilio (1947). "Los ascendientes de San Rosendo: notas para el estudio de la monarquía astur-leonesa durante los siglos IX y X". Hispania: revista española de Historia (in Spanish). No. XXX. Madrid: CSIC, Instituto Jerónimo Zurita. OCLC 682814356.
- Sánchez Candeira, Alfonso (1999). Rosa Montero Tejada (ed.). Castilla y León en el siglo X, estudio del reinado de Fernando I. Madrid: Real Academia de la Historia. ISBN 978-84-8951241-2.

Nuno Alvites family of Vímara Peres Born: ? Died: early 11th century
Titles of nobility
Preceded by Alvito Nunes	Count of Portugal; 1015–1028 with Ilduara Mendes	Succeeded by Mendo Nunes
