= Alvito Nunes =

Count of Portugal (died 1015)

Count of Portugal
- Tenure: 1008–1015
- Predecessor: Menendo González
- Successor: Nuno Alvites
- Died: 1015
- Spouse(s): Gontina
- Issue: Nuno Alvites, Segeredo Alvites, Pedro Alvites, Loba Alvites
- Father: Nuno Alvites

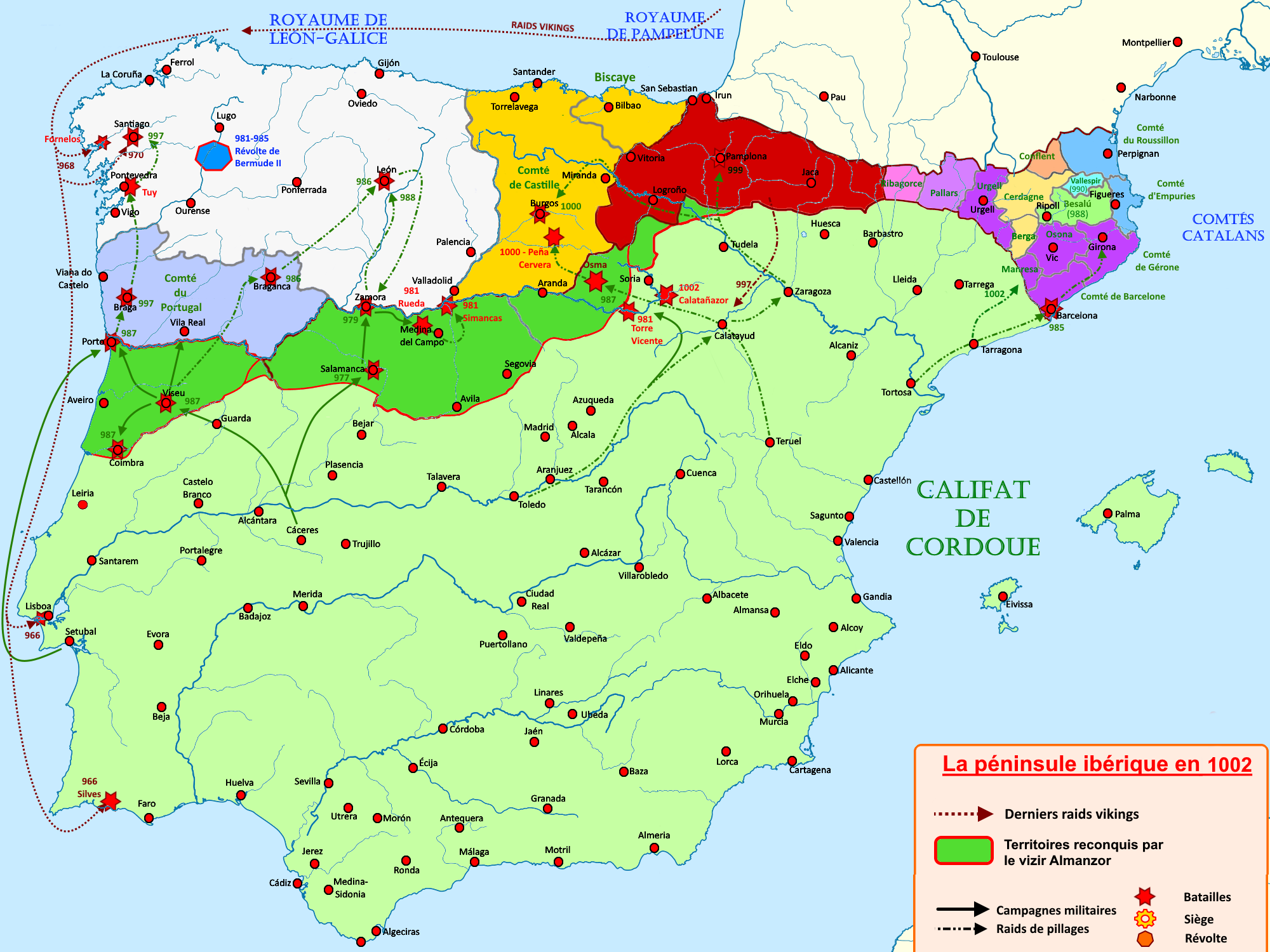
Iberian Peninsula in 1002 showing the County of Portugal

Alvito Nunes or Aloyto Núñez (Note: In the Chronicon Lusitanum his name is spelled Alvitus Nuniz.) (died 1015) was an 11th-century Count of Portugal. Following the death of Menendo González in 1008, he governed the county jointly with Toda, count Menendo's widow.

Alvito Nunes was killed by Vikings during a bloody assault on Vermoim Castle, located around Vila Nova de Famalicão.

He is believed to be descended from the first family Portuguese counts, that of Vímara Peres, through one Nuno Alvites (or Aloytez), probable grandson of Lucídio Vimaranes. He was followed in the county by his son Nuno Alvites who died in 1028.

== Marriage and issue ==
He married Gontina (Note: In 985, Segiredus presbiter, sold his inheritance in Villa Laginosa to Alloyttus and his wife Gudina.) with whom he had at least four children:

- Nuno Alvites (d. 1028) also known as Nuño Aloytez, married to Ilduara Mendes daughter of count Menendo González, who would rule in her own right after her husband's death.
- Segeredo Alvites or Aloytez, husband of Adosinda Arias and father of Azenda Segerédez, wife of Diego Gutiérrez, parents of Ardio Díaz, whose daughter Urraca Fróilaz was the first wife of count Pedro Fróilaz de Traba. Segeredo and his brother Pedro accompanied King Ferdinand I of León in the reconquest of Coimbra in 1064.
- Pedro Alvites, documented between 1025 and 1070, abbot at Guimarães.
- Loba Alvites

== Bibliography ==
- Herculano, Alexandre (1868). Academia de Ciencias de Lisboa (ed.). Portugaliae Monumenta Historica: Diplomata et chartae. Vol. I, Fasc. II. Lisbon: Olisipone. OCLC 504624362.
- Mattoso, José (1970a). "A nobreza portucalense dos séculos IX a XI" (PDF). Do tempo e da história (in Portuguese). III. Lisboa: Instituto de Alta Cultura, Centro de Estudos Historicos: 35–50. OCLC 565153778. Archived from the original (PDF) on 2012-01-26.
- Mattoso, José (1970b). Centro de Estudos Humanísticos, Faculdade de Letras de Universidade do Porto (ed.). As famílias condais portucalenses dos séculos X e XI (in Portuguese). Oporto: Instituto de Alta Cultura. OCLC 427415056.
- Torres Sevilla-Quiñones de León, Margarita Cecilia (1998). "Relaciones fronterizas entre Portugal y León en tiempos de Alfonso VII: el ejemplo de la Casa de Traba" (PDF). Revista da Faculdade de Letras: História (in Spanish) (15, 1). Universidade do Porto: 301–312. ISSN 0871-164X.

Alvito Nunes family of Vímara Peres Born: ? Died: 1015
Titles of nobility
Preceded by Menendo González	Count of Portugal; 1008–1015	Succeeded by Nuno Alvites with Ilduara Mendes
