= Mendo Nunes =

11th-century count of Portugal

- Comes Menendus

Count of Portugal
- Tenure: 1028–1050
- Predecessor: Nuno Alvites
- Successor: Nuno Mendes
- Died: 1050
- Issue: Nuno Mendes
- Father: Nuno Alvites
- Mother: Ilduara Mendes

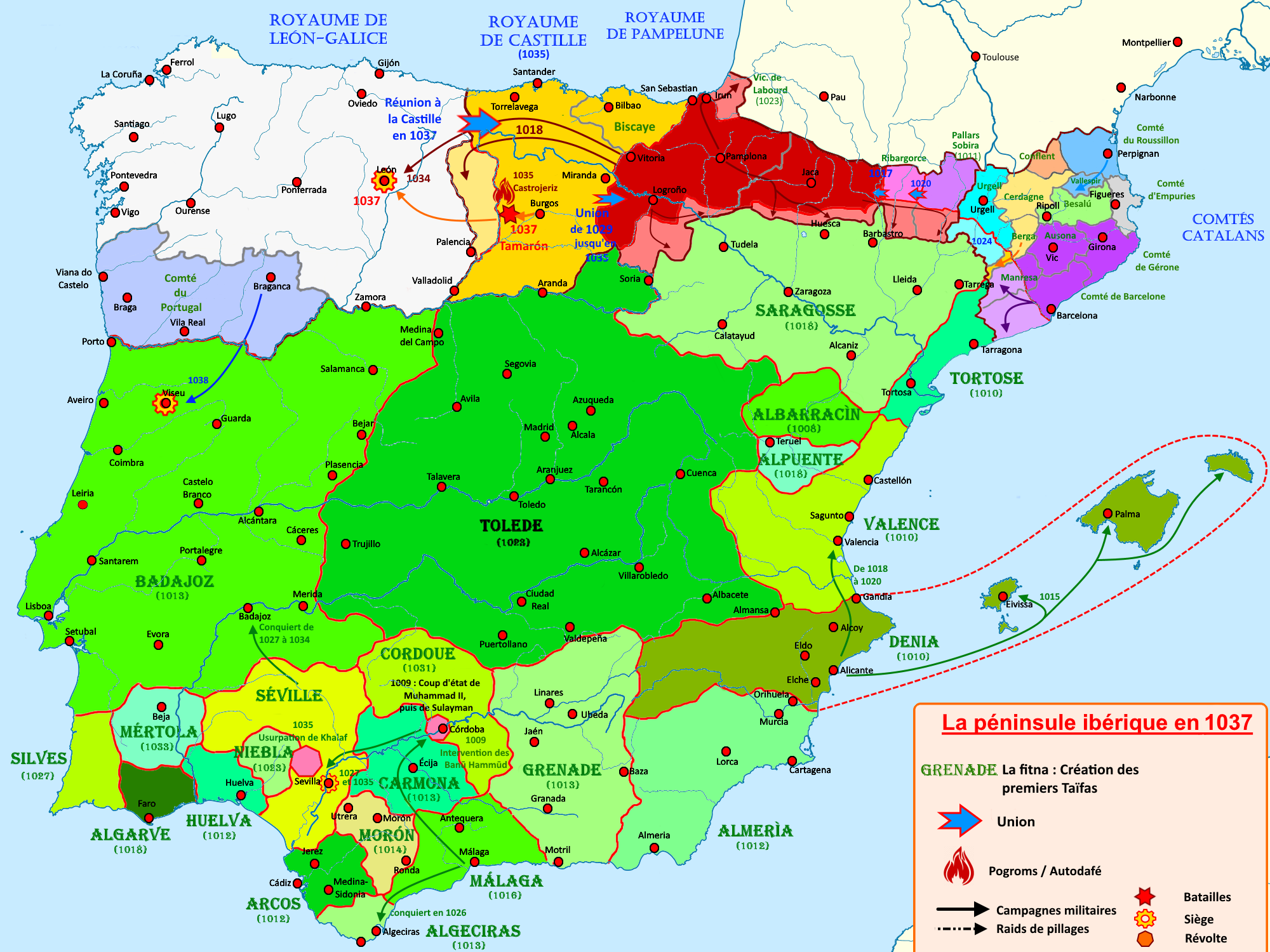
Iberian Peninsula in 1037 showing the County of Portugal

Mendo Nunes (Spanish: Menendo Núñez; (Note: Mentioned in a charter from the Cathedral of Coimbra in 1041 as comes menendus nuniz jointly with his mother eldara comitissa. Also recorded in the dating of a charter in 1041 as menindus nunniz dux. In 1043 he made a donation of his Vila Silvaris referring to himself as menendus dux magnus prolix nunus et ilduare. The charter is also confirmed by his mother.) (1020/1028 – 1050/1054) was a Count of Portugal from the family of Vímara Peres as the son of Nuno Alvites and Ilduara Mendes.

== Biographical sketch ==
Mendo succeeded his father, who died in 1028, in the governance of the County of Portugal, most probably as a minor under the tutorship of his mother Ilduara. Less than a decade later, in 1037 Ferdinand I acceded to the throne of León after defeating and killing his brother-in-law King Vermudo III in the Battle of Tamarón. By 1050, the new king had reorganized the administration of the kingdom curtailing the power of the nobility and royal appointees. He achieved this mainly by converting counties into non-hereditary tenures and taking advantage of any opportunity that arose to appoint new governors. The king did this gradually, region by region, so as not to alienate the powerful nobility of the kingdom and, in the case of the County of Portugal, by trying not to antagonize the powerful Galician and Portuguese members of the high nobility who were related to Count Mendo Nunes who was also a first cousin of his wife, Queen Sancha of León. (Note: Mendo's mother, Ilduara, was the sister of Sancha's mother, Queen Elvira Menéndez)

During count Mendo's lifetime, the king started to appoint members of the lower nobility to administrative posts such as Gómez Ectaz, who exercised authority in the region of Guimarães, and Diego Tructesíndez who acted as a judge, both reporting directly to the monarch. This practice became more widespread after Mendo's death with the king naming members of the lower ranks of the nobility to administrative positions, with various titles, such as vicar or governor, for example, Godino Benegas attested in 1062 as governor of Portugal: Gutinus Veniegas, qui tenebat illa terra de Portugale de ille rex (Godino Veniegas as tenant-in-chief of Portugal by appointment of the king). Years later, Mendo's granddaughter, Loba, married Sisnando Davides, a Mozarab of unknown background and certainly not of noble lineage, who was appointed by King Ferdinand governor of the county of Coimbra and who never entitled himself count preferring to use the titles of alvasil (Vizier) or consul.

The date of Count Mendo's death is uncertain due to a confusion with another contemporary count, Mendo Luz, as well as the erroneous date recorded in the Annales Portugalenses veteres which state that Era MLXXII occisus fuit comes Menendus in ripa Guetanie, i.e. Menendus was killed in Era MLXXII (era 1072, year 1034) in the Guetania River (a tributary of the Minho). Portuguese historian José Mattoso considers that the year of his death, probably violent, was 1050 and no later than 1053 whereas Spanish historian Alfonso Sánchez Candeira, believes that he died on 24 December 1054.

== Marriage and issue ==
The name of his wife is not recorded in any charters. He was succeeded by his son:

- Nuno Mendes.

== Bibliography ==
- Herculano, Alexandre (1868). Academia de Ciencias de Lisboa (ed.). Portugaliae Monumenta Historica: Diplomata et chartae. Vol. I, Fasc. II. Lisbon: Olisipone. OCLC 504624362.
- Mattoso, José (1981). A nobreza medieval portuguesa, a família e o poder (in Portuguese). Lisbon: Editorial Estampa. OCLC 8242615.
- Mattoso, José (1991). "A nobreza medieval Portuguesa no contexto peninsular" (PDF). Revista da Faculdade de Letras: História (in Portuguese). Vol. VIII, no. III. Porto: Universidade do Porto. pp. 1019–1044. ISSN 0871-164X.
- Mattoso, José (1982). Ricos-homens, infanções e cavaleiros: a nobreza medieval portuguesa nos séculos XI e XII (in Portuguese) (3rd ed.). Lisbon: Guimarães Editores. ISBN 9789726653035.
- Sánchez Candeira, Alfonso (1999). Rosa Montero Tejada (ed.). Castilla y León en el siglo XI, estudio del reinado de Fernando I (in Spanish). Madrid: Real Academia de la Historia. ISBN 978-84-8951241-2.

Mendo Nunes Family of Vímara Peres Born: ? Died: 1050/1054
Titles of nobility
Preceded by Nuno with Ilduara Mendes	Count of Portugal; 1028–1050/1054	Succeeded by Nuno Mendes
