= Nuno Mendes (count) =

Count of Portugal

- Comes Nunus Menendiz

Count of Portugal
- Tenure: 1050–1071
- Predecessor: Mendo Nunes
- Died: 18 February 1071
- Spouse: Goncina
- Issue: Loba "Aurevelido" Nunes
- Father: Mendo Nunes

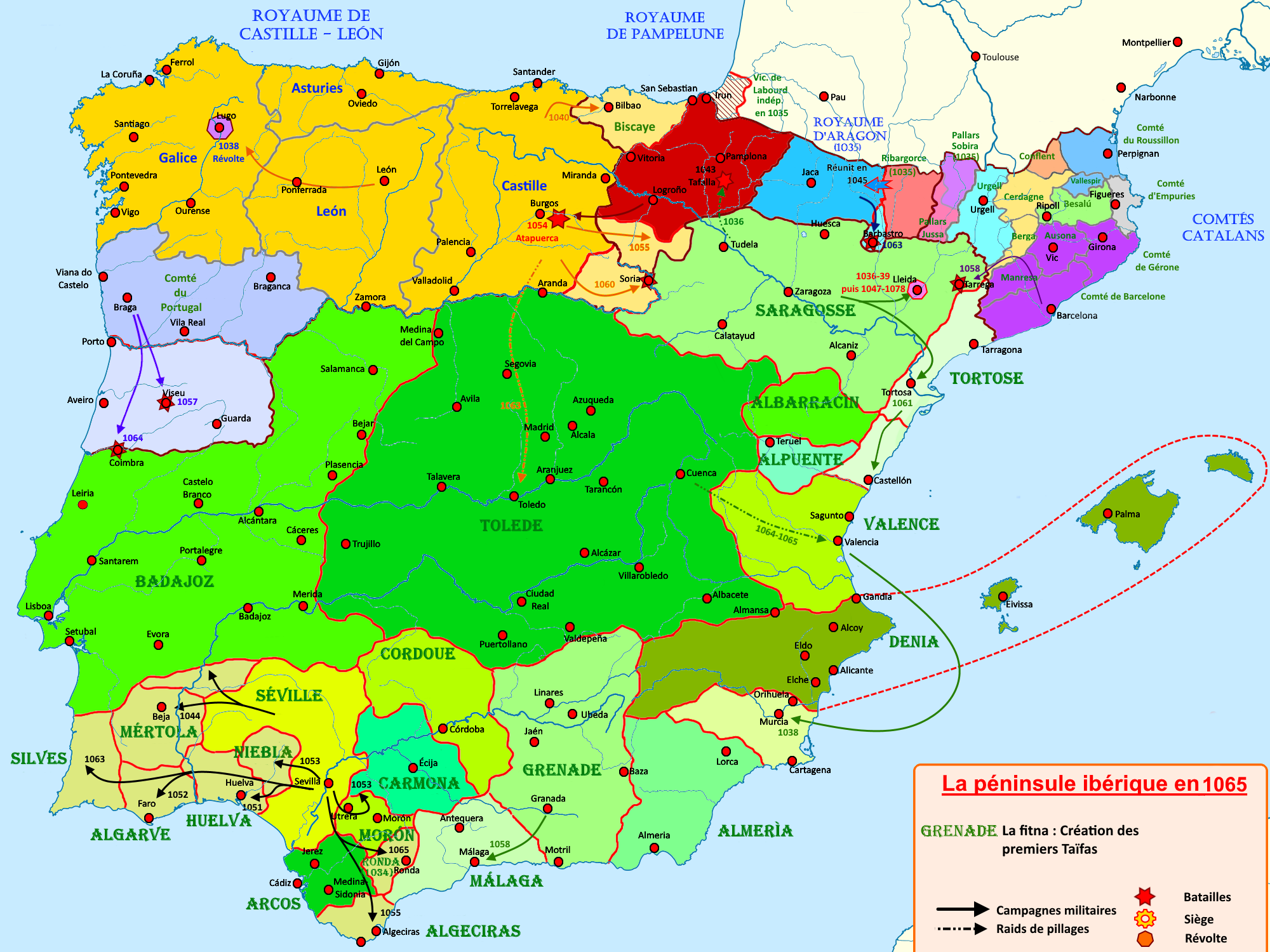
Iberian Peninsula in 1065 showing the County of Portugal

Nuno Mendes or Nuño Menéndez (died 18 February 1071) was the last count of Portugal of the House of Vímara Peres. The son of Count Mendo Nunes (Menendo Núñez), his pursuit of greater autonomy for Portugal brought him into conflict with King García II of Galicia.

Nuno Mendes succeeded his father, Mendo Nunes, as Count of Portugal and continued the efforts of the Portuguese nobility to maintain the county's autonomy. His opposition to García II culminated in the Battle of Pedroso on 18 February 1071, where Nuno Mendes was defeated and killed. His death ended the male line of the House of Vímara Peres, and García II subsequently took control of the County of Portugal.

== Biography ==
A patron of the Monastery of Guimarães, he first appears in the curia regis of King Ferdinand I of León in 1059, and with the title of count for the first time in 1070 when he appears confirming a donation made by King Garcia II.

He married Goncina with whom he appears on 17 February 1071 making a donation to the Monastery of Santo Antonino de Barbudo of some properties in Luivão (Lage, Vila Verde), confirming as Ego comes Nunus Menendiz et uxor mea comitissa domna Goncina ("I, Count Nuno Menéndez and my wife Countess dona Goncina").

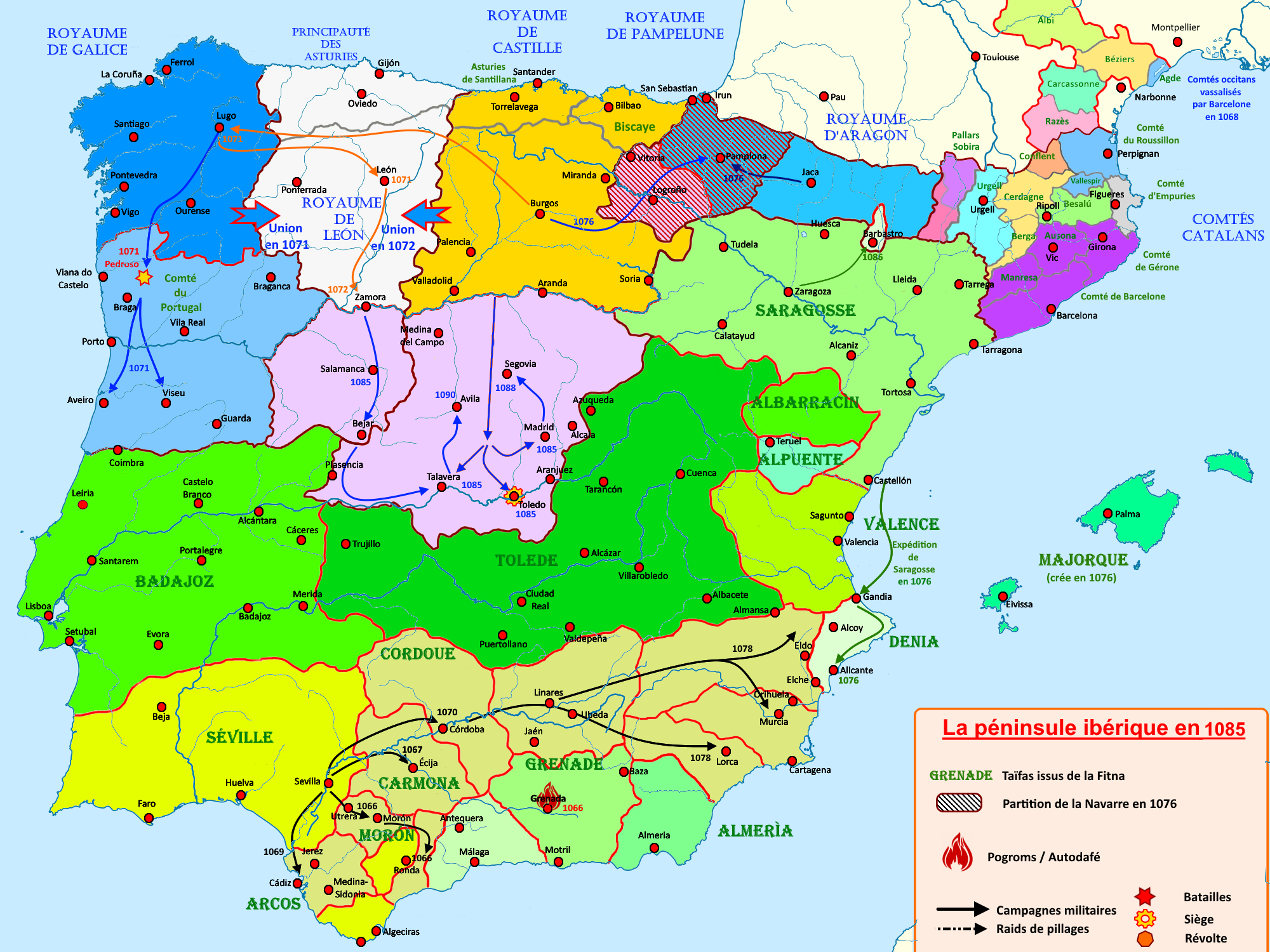
Map of the Iberian Peninsula in 1085, showing the Battle of Pedroso .

On 18 February 1071 he fought in the Battle of Pedroso, near the Monastery of São Martinho de Tibães, and his defeat and death led the winning Garcia II to call himself King of Galicia and Portugal. The County of Portugal was then subsumed into the crowns of Galicia and León until regranted by King Alfonso VI of León and Castile a quarter-century later.

He owned properties in Braga (Nogueira, Santa Tecla, Dadim, Barros and Gualtar) and Porto (Cerqueda) which were probably confiscated after his defeat and given later by King Alfonso VI of León to his son-in-law Sisnando Davides. Although the battle of Pedroso has been mistakenly dated in January of that year, as mentioned in the Chronica Gothorum, this donation proves that the battle took place in February rather than in January.

== Marriage and issue ==
Nuno Mendes married Goncina and had at least one daughter, named Loba "Aurevelido" Nunes. Loba married Sisnando Davides, and with him had Elvira Sisnandes (whose husband Count Martim Moniz succeeded Sisnando as Count of Coimbra).

Nuno Mendes could also have been the father of Count Gómez Núñez and his brother Count Fernando. (Note: According to Portuguese sources, Count Gómez was the son of Count Nuño Velázquez. Nevertheless, Nuño Velázquez appears in a charter dated 1070 at the Monastery of Sahagún with his wife Fronilde Sánchez and his children, Alfonso, Menendo, Sancho, and Elvira Núñez with no mention of a son named Gómez. Fernando Núñez also appears with his wife Mayor Rodríguez in a charter dated 29 December 1127 making a donation to Ourense Cathedral of his part in the Monastery of Santa María de Porqueira which, as he states, he had inherited from his grandmother Goncina and from his father Nuño Mídiz (perhaps Menéndez). Moreover, Gómez Núñez also appears in 1138 donating a property that he had inherited from Countess Goncina, "my father's mother" and a few years earlier, in 1126, he made another donation to the Cluny Abbey in which he mentions his brother Fernando Núñez.)

== Bibliography ==
- Barton, Simon (1997). The Aristocracy in Twelfth-century León and Castile. Cambridge: Cambridge University Press. ISBN 9780521497275.
- Carvalho Correia, Francisco (2008). O Mosteiro de Santo Tirso de 978 a 1588: a silhueta de uma entidade projectada no chao de uma história milenária (in Portuguese). Santiago de Compostela: Universidade de Santiago de Compostela: Servizo de Publicacións e Intercambio Científico. ISBN 978-84-9887-038-1. Archived from the original on October 4, 2013.
- Costa, Avelino de Jesus da (1956). "A restauração da diocese de Braga". Revista Lusitania Sacra (in Portuguese). No. 1. pp. 17–28. ISSN 0076-1508.
- Mattoso, José (1981). "As famílias condais portucalenses dos séculos X e XI". A nobreza medieval portuguesa, a família e o poder (in Portuguese). Lisbon: Editorial Estampa, Lda. (Imprensa Universitaria). OCLC 8242615.
- Mattoso, José (1970). "A nobreza portucalense dos séculos IX a XI" (PDF). Do tempo e da história (in Portuguese). No. III. Lisbon: Instituto de alta cultura. Centro de estudos históricos. pp. 35–50. Archived from the original (PDF) on January 26, 2012.
- Salazar y Acha, Jaime de (1989). "Los descendientes del conde Ero Fernández, fundador del Monasterio de Santa María de Ferreira de Pallares". El Museo de Pontevedra (in Spanish) (43): 67–86. ISSN 0210-7791.
- Saravia, Anísio Miguel de Sousa (coordinator) (2013). Espaço, poder e memória: a Catedral de Lamego, sécs. XII a XX (in Portuguese). Lisbon: Universidade Católica Portuguesa, Centro de Estudos de História Religiosa. hdl:10400.14/12795. ISBN 978-972-8361-57-0.

Regnal titles
| Preceded by Mendo Nunes | Count of Portugal; 1050–1071 | Title abandoned |
