= Alvitus =

Alvitus is a masculine given name well attested in medieval Galicia. Other attested spellings include Aluitus, Albitus, Aloitus, Aloytus, Albittus and Aloittus. The Romance forms are Alvito, Aloito, Aloyto and Albito.

The etymology of Alvitus is uncertain. It may be of pre-Roman origin. A proposed derivation from the Latin name Albus is unlikely. It has been proposed as a hypocoristic form of Álvaro and as a name of Gothic origin. The name Alvith is attested among the Heruli.

People with the name include:

- Alvito Nunes (died 1015), count of Portugal
- Aloito (bishop of Mondoñedo) (fl. 1040)
- Alvito (bishop of León) (died 1063)

The patronymic form is Alvites or Alóitez. Examples include:

- Hermenegildo Alóitez (born c. 898), Galicia nobleman
- Nuno Alvites (fl. 1017–1028), count of Portugal
