= Battle of Pedroso =

1071 battle between Galicia and Portugal

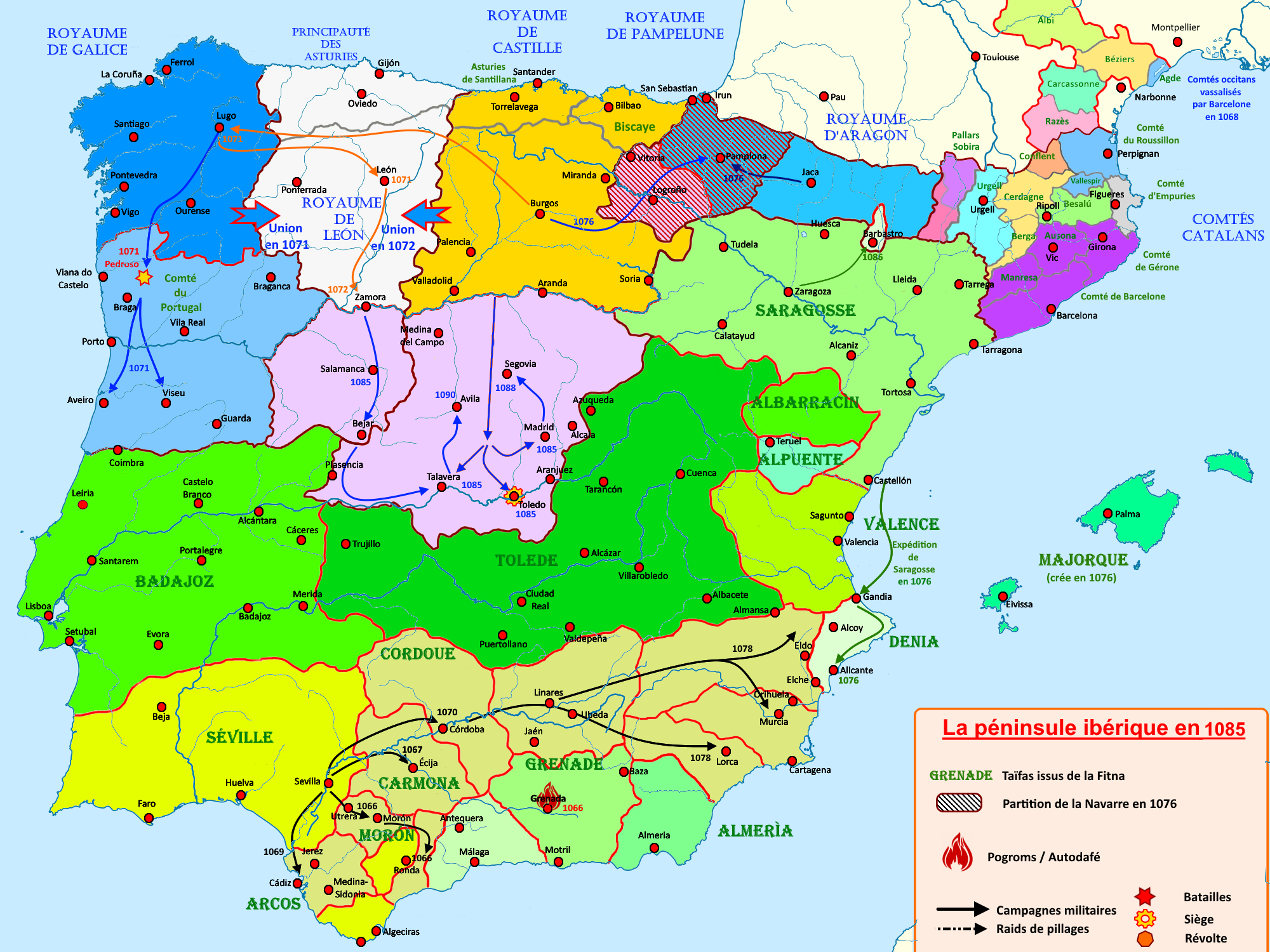
- Map of the Iberian Peninsula in 1085, showing the Battle of Pedroso in northern Portugal
Date	Between 18 and 28 February 1071
Location	Pedroso, near Braga 41.567222°N 8.489444°W
Result	Galician victory

Belligerents
County of Portugal	Kingdom of Galicia

Commanders and leaders
Nuno II Mendes †	García II

The Battle of Pedroso was fought on 18 February 1071 at Pedroso, near the crossing of the Cávado River, next to the Monastery of São Martinho de Tibães near Braga, Portugal.

The battle has sometimes been dated to January, following the date given in the Chronica Gothorum. However, a donation to the Monastery of Santo Antonino de Barbudo dated 17 February 1071 indicates that the battle took place later that month.

Forces under García II, King of Galicia, defeated those under Nuno II Mendes, the last count of Portugal of the House of Vímara Peres. Nuno Mendes was killed in the battle, after which García II took control of the County of Portugal.
