= County of Portugal =

County in Southwestern Europe (868–1071 and 1096–1139)

County of Portugal Condado de Portugal (Old Galician) Comitatus Portugalliæ (Latin)
- 868–1071; 1096–1139
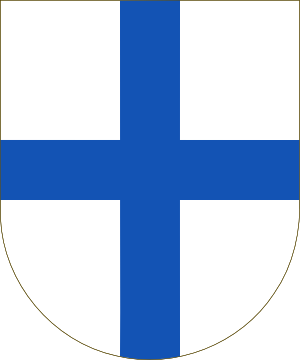
- Banner Coat of arms

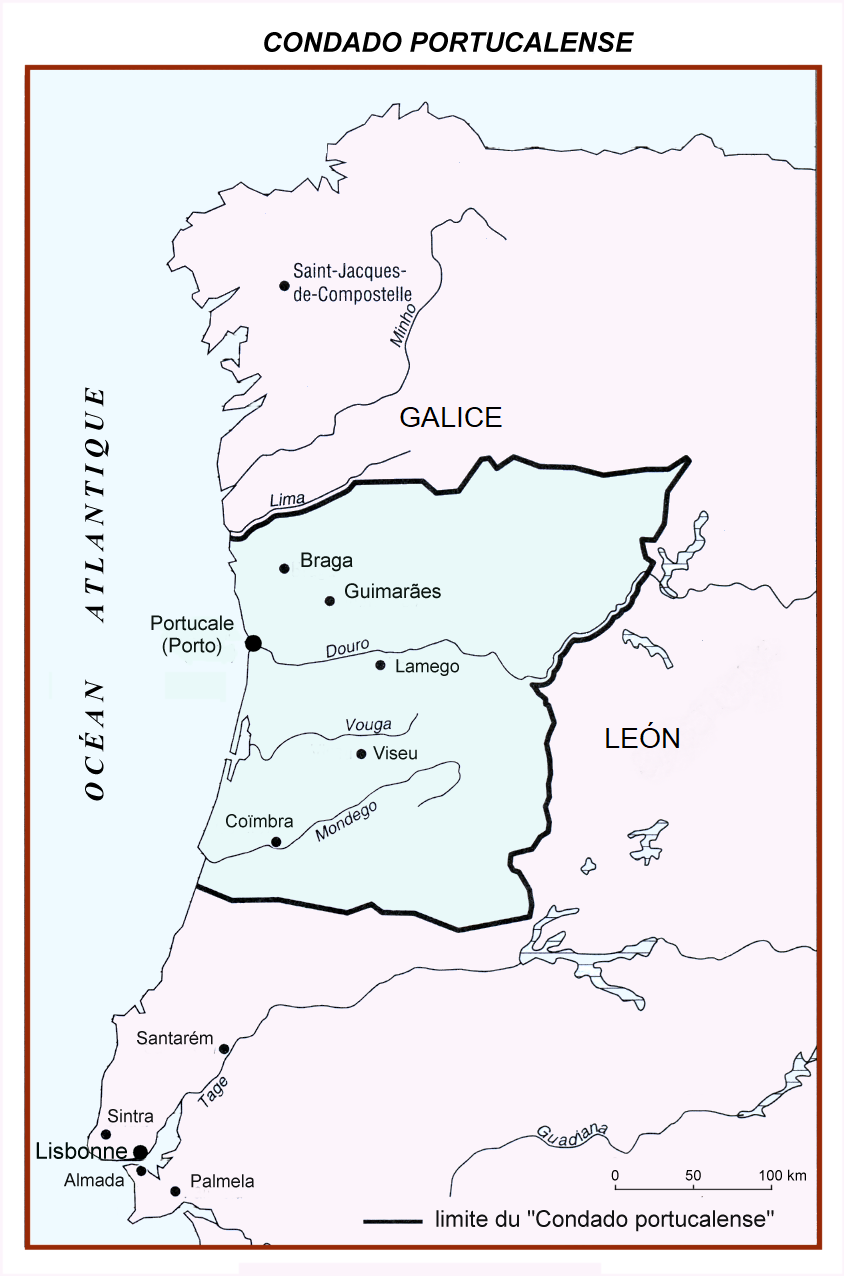
- Second County of Portugal
- Status: County within the Kingdoms of Asturias, Galicia, and León
- Capital: Guimarães (868–1131); Coimbra (1131–1139)
- Common languages: Galician–Portuguese; Mozarabic; Andalusian Arabic
- Religion: Chalcedonian Christianity (official, until 1054); Latin Catholicism (from 1054, official); Islam; Judaism
- Demonym: Portuguese
- Government: Feudal monarchy
- Count of Portucale
  - 868–873: Vímara Peres (first of the first county, from the House of Vímara)
  - 1050–1071: Nuno II Mendes (last of the first county, from the House of Vímara; Annexation to the Kingdom of Galicia)
  - 1096–1112: Henry (first of second county, from the house of Burgundy)
  - 1112–1139: Afonso Henriques (last of the second county)
- History
  - Established: 868
  - Battle of Ourique: 1139
Preceded by
Kingdom of Asturias
Kingdom of Galicia
Kingdom of León
County of Coimbra
Succeeded by
Kingdom of Portugal
Portugal in the Middle Ages
- Today part of: Portugal; Spain

The County of Portugal (Galician-Portuguese: Condado de Portugal; referred to as Portugalia in contemporary documents) refers to two successive medieval counties in the region around Guimarães and Porto, today corresponding to litoral northern Portugal, within which the identity of the Portuguese people formed. The first county existed from the mid-ninth to the mid-eleventh centuries as a vassalage of the Kingdom of Asturias and the Kingdom of Galicia and also a part of the Kingdom of León, before being abolished as a result of rebellion. A larger entity under the same name was then reestablished in the late 11th century and subsequently elevated by its count in the mid-12th century into an independent Kingdom of Portugal.

== First county ==
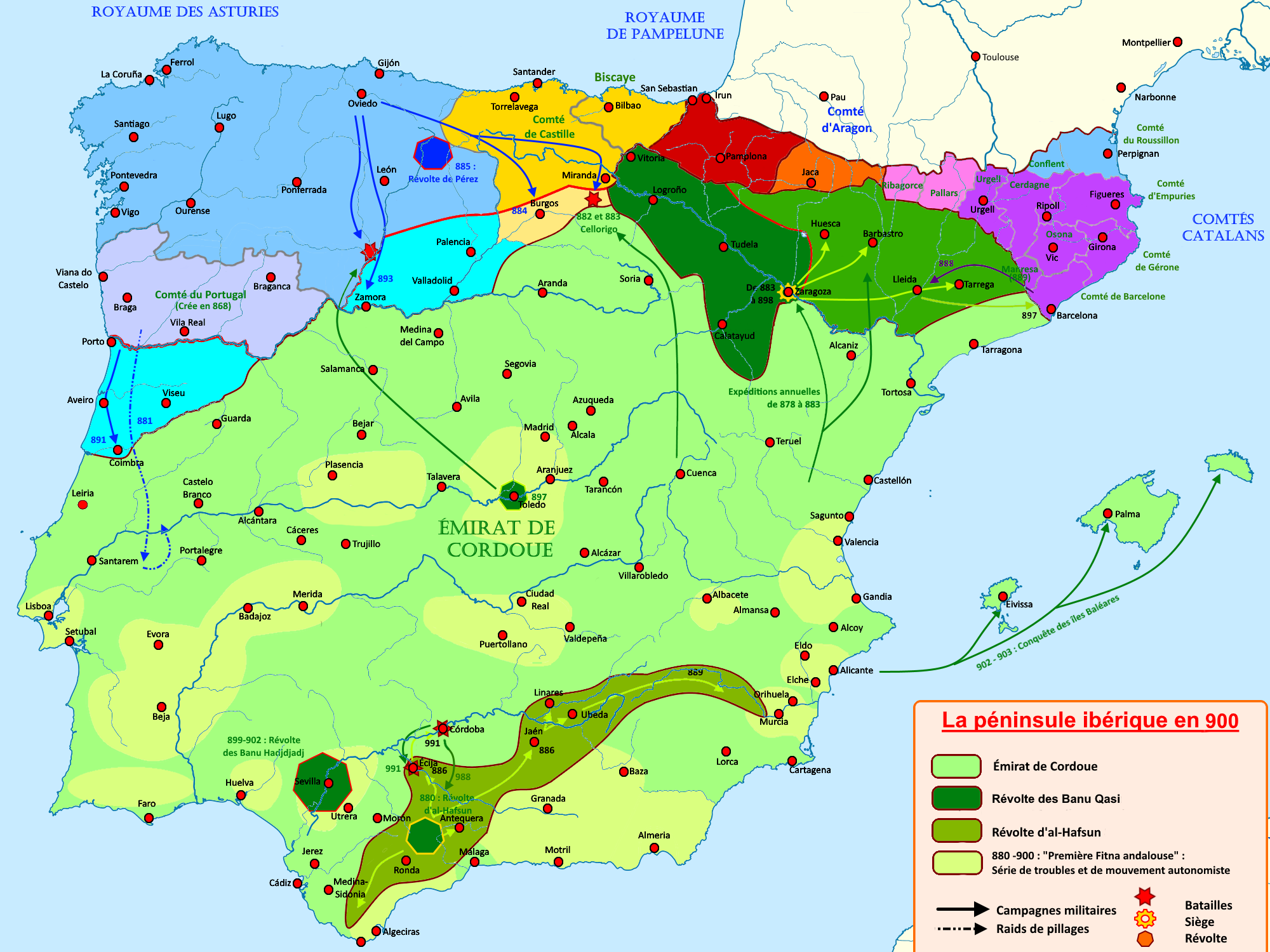
Iberian Peninsula around 900, First County of Portugal show in lavender blue.

The history of the county of Portugal is traditionally dated from the reconquest of Portus Cale (Porto) by Vímara Peres in 868. He was named a count and given control of the frontier region between the Limia and Douro rivers by Alfonso III of Asturias. South of the Douro, another border county would be formed decades later when what would become the County of Coimbra was conquered from the Moors by Hermenegildo Guterres. This moved the frontier away from the southern bounds of the county of Portugal, but it was still subject to repeated campaigns from the Caliphate of Córdoba. The recapture of Coimbra by Almanzor in 987 again placed the County of Portugal on the southern frontier of the Leonese state for most of the rest of the first county's existence. The regions to its south were only again conquered in the reign of Ferdinand I of León and Castile, with Lamego falling in 1057, Viseu in 1058 and finally Coimbra in 1064.

The leaders of the first county of Portugal reached the height of their power in the late 10th century, when Count Gonzalo Menéndez may have used the title magnus dux portucalensium ("grand duke of Portugal") and his son Menendo used the title dux magnus (grand duke). It could have been this Count Gonzalo who assassinated Sancho I of León after inviting the King to a banquet and offering him a poisoned apple. Not all historians, however, believe that Gonzalo Menéndez was responsible for the king's death and some attribute the regicide to a contemporary count named Gonzalo Muñoz.

In the late 960s Gonzalo's lands were ravaged by Vikings, and in 968, he fell out with king Ramiro III over the latter's refusal to fight the raiders. His son Menendo had close relations with Ramiro's rival and successor, Bermudo II, being made the king's alférez and tutor of his son, the future king Alfonso V. Following Alfonso's succession, Menendo would serve as regent for the boy king and married him to one of Menendo's daughters.

The county continued with varying degrees of autonomy within the Kingdom of León and, during brief periods of division, the Kingdom of Galicia until 1071, when Count Nuno Mendes, desiring greater autonomy for Portugal, was defeated and killed in the Battle of Pedroso by King García II of Galicia, who then proclaimed himself the King of Galicia and Portugal, the first time a royal title was used in reference to Portugal. The independent county was abolished, its territories remaining within the crown of Galicia, which was in turn subsumed within the larger kingdoms of García's brothers, Sancho II and Alfonso VI of León and Castile.

== Second county ==
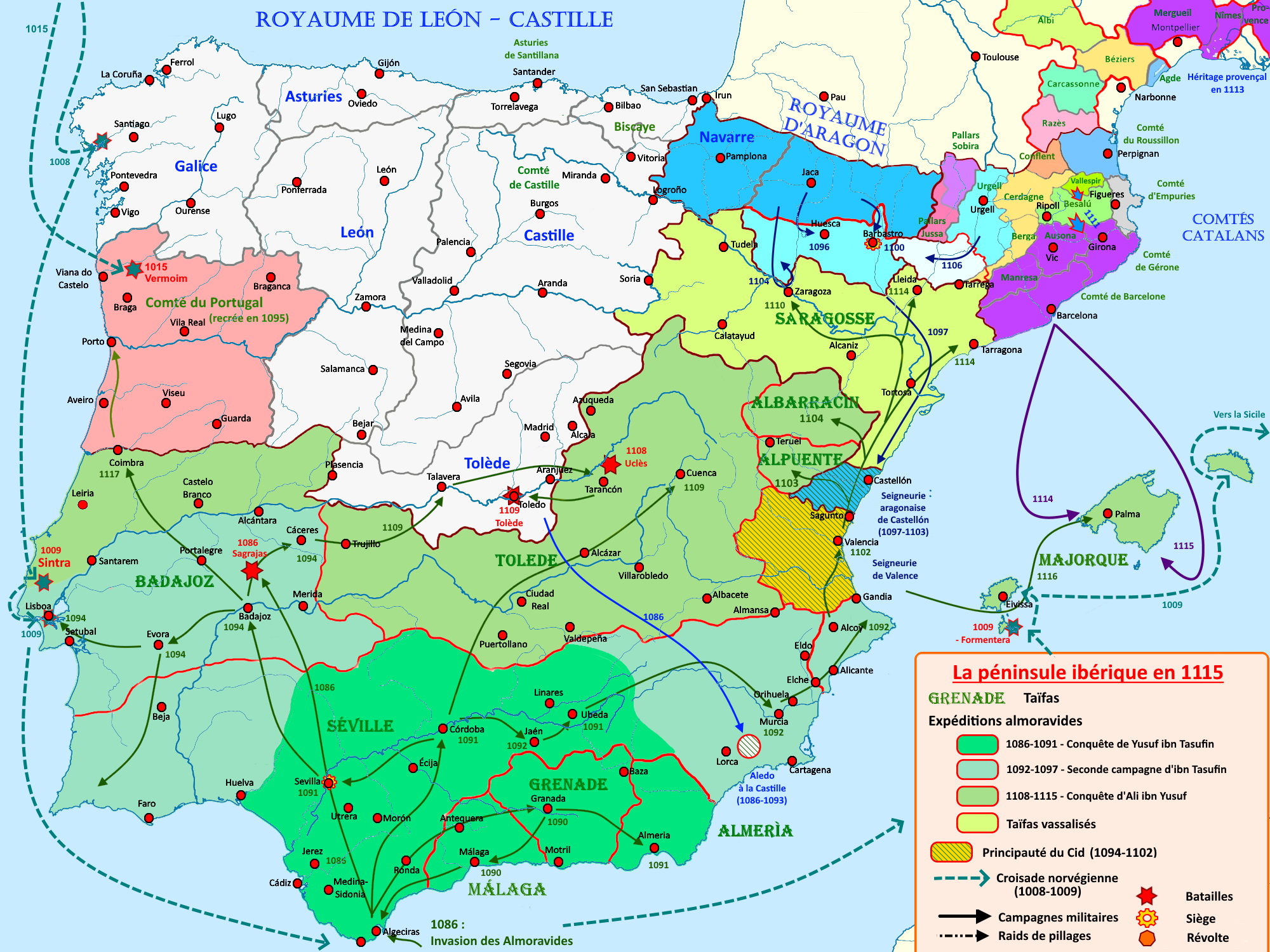
Iberian Peninsula around 1115, Second County of Portugal show in pale red.

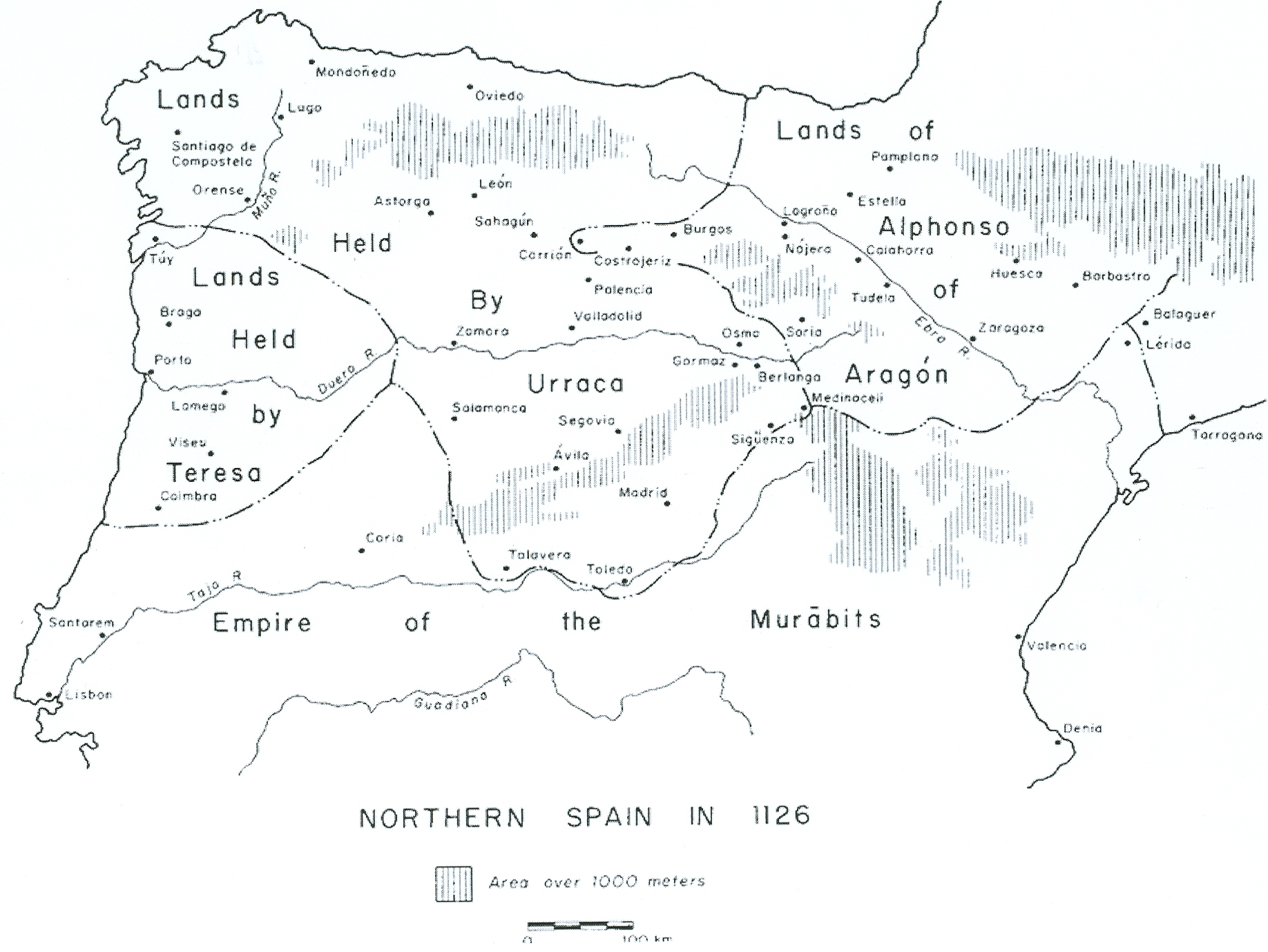
Political map of the north part of the Iberian peninsula in the year 1126

In 1093, Alfonso VI nominated his son-in-law Raymond of Burgundy as count of Galicia, then including modern Portugal as far south as Coimbra, though Alfonso himself retained the title of king over the same territory. However, concern for Raymond's growing power led Alfonso in 1096 to separate Portugal and Coimbra from Galicia and grant them to another son-in-law, Henry of Burgundy, wed to Alfonso VI's illegitimate daughter Theresa. Henry chose Guimarães as the base for this newly formed county, the Condado Portucalense, known at the time as Terra Portucalense or Província Portucalense, which would last until Portugal achieved its independence, recognized by the Kingdom of León in 1143. Its territory included much of the current Portuguese territory between the Minho River and the Tagus River.

Count Henry continued the Reconquista in western Iberia and expanded his county's dominions. He was also involved in several intrigues inside the Leonese court together with his cousin Raymond and sister-in-law Urraca of Castile, in which he supported Raymond's ascension in return for promises of autonomy or independence for Portugal. In 1111 the Muslims conquered Santarém. When Count Henry died in 1112, the population of the County of Portugal, including the powerful families, favored independence. Henry's widow, Theresa, took the reins on behalf of her young son, and allied herself with Galician nobility in order to challenge her sister queen Urraca's dominance and briefly used the title Queen. However, she was defeated by Urraca in 1121 and forced to accept a position of feudal subservience to the Leonese state. Her own son, Afonso Henriques, took the reins of the government in 1128 after routing his mother's forces in the Battle of São Mamede, near Guimarães. After this battle, he began to exhibit a seal with a cross and the word "Portugal", and he continued to win battles, supported by the nobles of Entre-Douro-e-Minho. Nevertheless:

Even then, between 1128 and 1139 he never used the title of king, but rather that of princeps or infante, which means, in fact, that he could not resolve on his own account, the issue of his political category; that is, he had to admit that it depended on the consent of Alfonso VII who was, in fact, the legitimate heir of Alfonso VI. Also, he never used the title of "count" which would place him in a clear position of dependence vis-à-vis the king of León and Castile. (translation)

It was his triumph in the Battle of Ourique in 1139, which led to his proclamation as King of Portugal by his troops. Finally in 1143, his nominal overlord Alfonso VII of León and Castile recognized the de facto independence of Portugal in the Treaty of Zamora.

== List of counts ==
=== First county ('House of Vímara') ===
- Vímara Peres (868–873)
- Lucídio Vimaranes (873–924)
- Hermenegildo González (c.924–c.950)
- Mumadona Dias (c.924–c.950)
- Gonzalo Menéndez (c.950–997), self-styled "Grand Duke of Portugal"
- Menendo González (997–1008)
- Alvito Nunes (1008–1015)
- Nuno Alvites (1017–1028)
- Ilduara Mendes (1017–1028, as regent for son)
- Mendo Nunes (1028–1050)
- Nuno Mendes (1050–1071)

Family tree

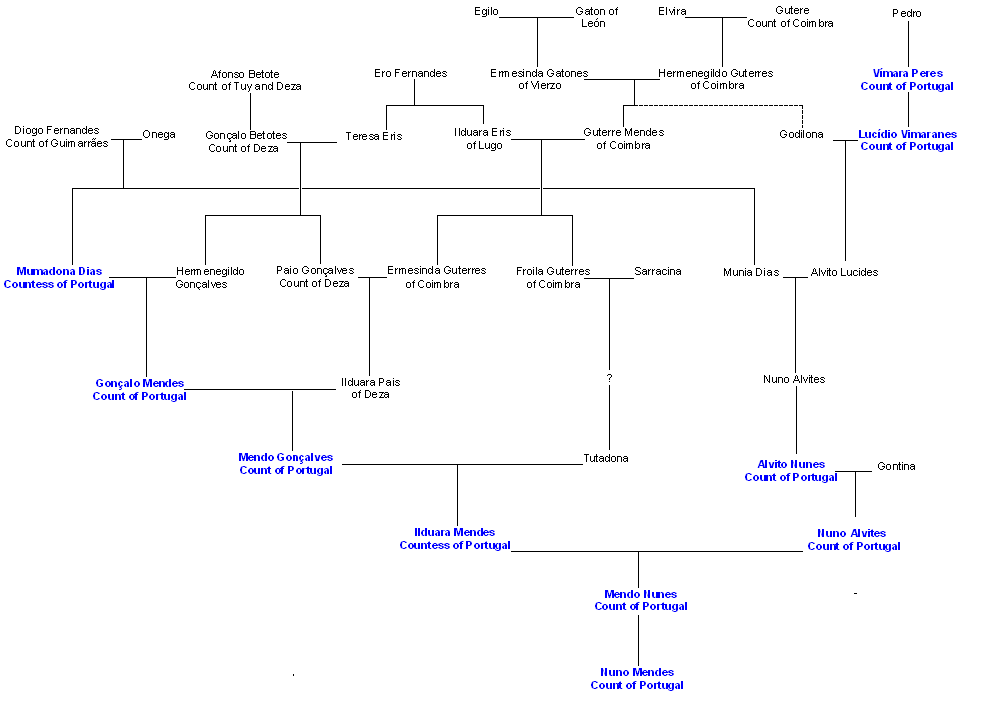

=== Second county ('House of Burgundy') ===
- Henry (1096–1112)
- Theresa (1096-1128) (Note: Recognized as "Queen of Portugal" in 1116 by Pope Paschal II, but forced to renounce the claimed independence in 1121, although she would continue to be styled "Queen" in later documents.)
- Afonso (1112/1128–1143) (Note: Proclaimed king by his troops in 1139, and recognized as independent by the king of León in 1143. Portugal was acknowledged as an independent kingdom by Pope Alexander III in 1179.)

== See also ==
- Portugal in the Middle Ages
  - Portugal in the Reconquista

== Bibliography ==
- Barton, Simon (1997). The Aristocracy in Twelfth-Century León and Castile. Cambridge, England: Cambridge University Press. ISBN 978-0521-4972-75.
- Ferreira, João (2010), Histórias Rocambolescas da História de Portugal [Fantastic Stories of the History of Portugal] (in Portuguese) (6 ed.), Lisbon, Portugal: A Esfera dos Livros, ISBN 9789896267681
- Mattoso, José (2014). D. Afonso Henriques (in Portuguese) (2nd ed.). Lisbon: Temas e Debates. ISBN 978-972-759-911-0.
- Mattoso, José (1982). Ricos-homens, infanções e cavaleiros: a nobreza medieval portuguesa nos séculos XI e XII (in Portuguese) (3rd ed.). Lisbon: Guimarães Editores. ISBN 9789726653035.
- Serrão, Joel (1990), Dicionário de História de Portugal (in Portuguese), vol. II Castanhoso-Fez, Porto, Portugal: Livraria Figueirinhas
