= Lucídio Vimaranes =

Count of Portugal (died c. 922)

Count of Portucale
- Tenure: 873-924
- Predecessor: Vímara Peres
- Successor: Hermenegildo González and Mumadona Dias
- Died: c. 922
- Spouse(s): Gudilona
- Issue: Tedón Lucídiz, Vermudo Lucídiz, Alvito Lucides, Rodrigo Lucídiz
- Father: Vímara Peres

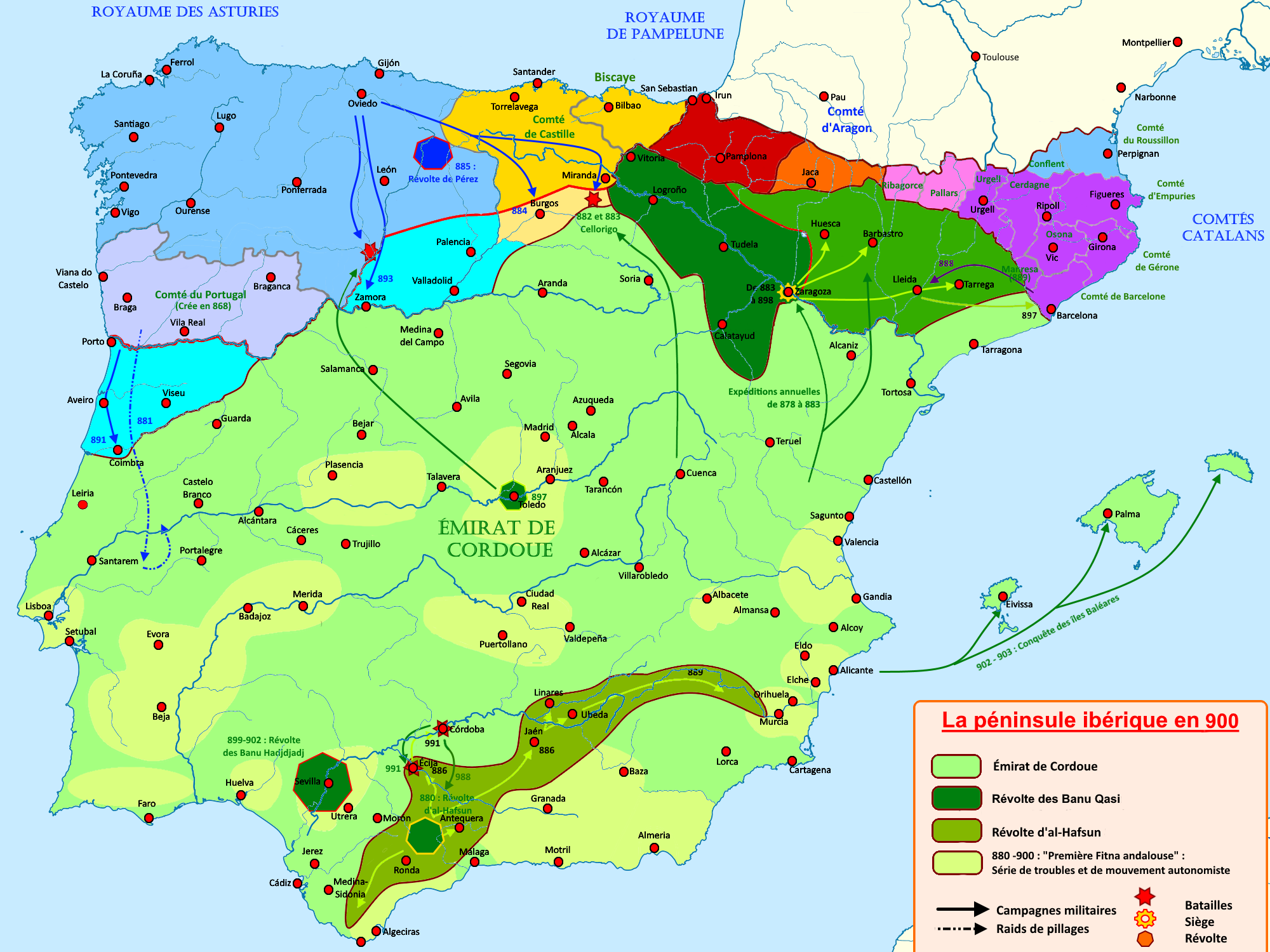
Iberian Peninsula in 900, showing the County of Portugal in lavender blue

Lucídio Vimaranes (died c. 922) was the second count of Portugal within the Kingdom of Asturias, which was divided internally into several provinces called "counties". Portus Cale was one of these counties which was incorporated in the Kingdom as a new land conquered from the moors. Although Lucídio's parentage is not confirmed in any source, all historians agree that based on his uncommon patronymic, he was most probably the son of Vímara Peres.

Upon the death of his father, King Alfonso III of Asturias entrusted him with the government of the County of Portugal jointly with Count Hermenegildo Gutiérrez.

He governed as tenant-in-chief part of the territory of Lugo in 910, and in the following year appears as a previsor in Dume. Lucídio was a member of the Curia Regis and as such, confirmed several royal charters between 887 and 917.

== Marriage and issue ==
He married Gudilona (d. after 915). Her parentage has not been confirmed and historian António Fernandes Almeida believes that she was probably the daughter of Hermenegildo Gutiérrez, although José Mattoso points out that there is no documentary proof sustaining this relationship. Both appear together in 915 donating Fermoselhe to the Cathedral of Coimbra. They were the parents of:

- Tedón Lucídiz
- Vermudo Lucídiz
- Alvito Lucides, (Note: He appears in 924 confirming a charter in the Cathedral of Coimbra after his brother Rodrigo as Aluitus luciti, in 926 in Guimarães as Aloitus lucidi, and in 928 in the Monastery of Lorvão as Aloytus lucidi.) married Munia Dias, daughter of Count Diogo Fernandes and sister of Mumadona Dias. Their son, Lucidio Alvites was the father of Onega Lucídiz, the second wife of Count Rodrigo Velázquez who was defeated by his rival, Count Gonzalo Menéndez in the Battle of Aguioncha. This Onega (also spelled Onneca) is often confused with her namesake, the wife of the aforementioned count Diogo Fernandes.
- Rodrigo Lucídiz

== Bibliography ==
- Herculano, Alexandre (1868). Academia de Ciencias de Lisboa (ed.). Portugaliae Monumenta Historica: Diplomata et chartae. Vol. I, Fasc. I. Lisbon: Olisipone. OCLC 504624362.
- Mattoso, José (1981). "As famílias condais portucalenses dos séculos X e XI". A nobreza medieval portuguesa, a família e o poder (in Portuguese). Lisbon: Editorial Estampa. OCLC 8242615.
- Sáez, Emilio (1947). "Los ascendientes de San Rosendo: notas para el estudio de la monarquía astur-leonesa durante los siglos IX y X". Hispania: revista española de Historia (in Spanish). No. XXX. Madrid: CSIC, Instituto Jerónimo Zurita. pp. 139–156. OCLC 682814356.

Lucídio Vimaranes family of Vímara Peres Born: ? Died: 922?
Titles of nobility
Preceded by Vímara	Count of Portugal; 873-922??	Succeeded by Mumadona Dias
