= Ilduara Mendes =

Countess of Portugal

Ilduara Mendes or Ilduara Menéndez (attested 1025 – 1058), was a Countess of Portugal, and regent of Portugal during the minority of her son.

== Life ==
Daughter of Count Menendo González and his wife Tutadomna Moniz, Ilduara had several brothers and sister, including Elvira Menéndez, wife of King Alfonso V of León. She governed the county jointly with her husband Count Nuno Alvites, son of Alvito Nunes and Gontina. Since their son Mendo Nunes was a minor in 1028 when his father died, he governed the county under the tutelage of his mother Ilduara.

== Bibliography ==
- Mattoso, José (1981). "As famílias condais portucalenses dos séculos X e XII". A nobreza medieval portuguesa: a família e o poder (in Portuguese). (Originally published in Studium Generale 12 (1968-1969) pp. 59–115). Lisbon: Editorial Estampa. pp. 101–157. OCLC 8242615.

Ilduara Mendes Betotez family Born: ? Died: 1058
Titles of nobility
Preceded by Alvito Nunes	Countess of Portugal; 1015–1028 with Nuno Alvites	Succeeded by Mendo Nunes
