= Velasco Sánchez =

Iberian nobleman

Velasco (or Blasco) Sánchez (floruit 1153–1181) was an Iberian nobleman who held various political and military offices in three different kingdoms, serving under Afonso I of Portugal, Alfonso VIII of Castile, and Ferdinand II of León. He held the rank of count from at least May 1159.

Velasco's family was from Galicia. He was a son of Sancho Núñez and Sancha Enríquez. Sancho was a son of Nuño Velázquez and brother of Alfonso Núñez. Sancha was a daughter of Henry of Burgundy and Teresa Alfonso, a daughter of Alfonso VI of León. In December 1166 two Portuguese royal charters referred to Velasco as filius sororis eius, "his sister's son", him being the king of Portugal, Afonso I, son of Henry. Velasco married Urraca Viegas, daughter of Egas Moniz. They had one recorded son, Rodrigo. Rodrigo was active in Portugal.

Velasco was the court steward (curiae dapifer) of Afonso of Portugal in August 1161. In that same year, just before going to war, and fearing that he might die without a chance to make a last confession, Velasco dictated his will, wherein he pledged the three villages he owned to three religious establishments: Barazas to the Hospitallers, Azarón to the Church of the Holy Sepulchre, and Coleo to the Cathedral of Santa María. This will (which was not in any case final) also gives indication of Velasco's movable wealth. He later served as majordomo (dapifer) between March 1169 and July 1172. In March 1171 he was the standard-bearer (signifer) of the infante Sancho. Late in 1172 he went into exile at the court of Alfonso of Castile, who made him the governor of Ávila in April 1173. He was present at court from February 1173 until August 1174. That same month he moved to the court of Ferdinand of León, where he stayed until June 1181, perhaps until his death.

Ferdinand immediately invested him with the government of Extremadura as a fief (tenencia) of the crown. Extremadura was a frontier tenencia in the south of the kingdom. By January 1176 he was also governing the Limia, a Galician tenencia in the north of the kingdom. In August 1177 he was governing Cubillas and Medina del Campo and in October Monforte de Lemos. Between February 1178 to February 1180 he was the governor of the Bierzo (and eventually Ulver), although his government may have been briefly interrupted by Alfonso Ramírez in July 1178, when he was briefly in charge of Toroño. In September 1178 he was governing Ciudad Rodrigo. Coinciding with this he lost the government of Extremadura, but gained that of Salamanca (until February 1179). The last post Velasco got was Zamora, which he governed from July 1180 until his death. Among the lesser fiefs governed by Velasco on behalf of the crown of León were Toro (March 1175) and Valdeorras (August 1180).
