= Mumadona Dias =

Countess of Portugal (died 968)

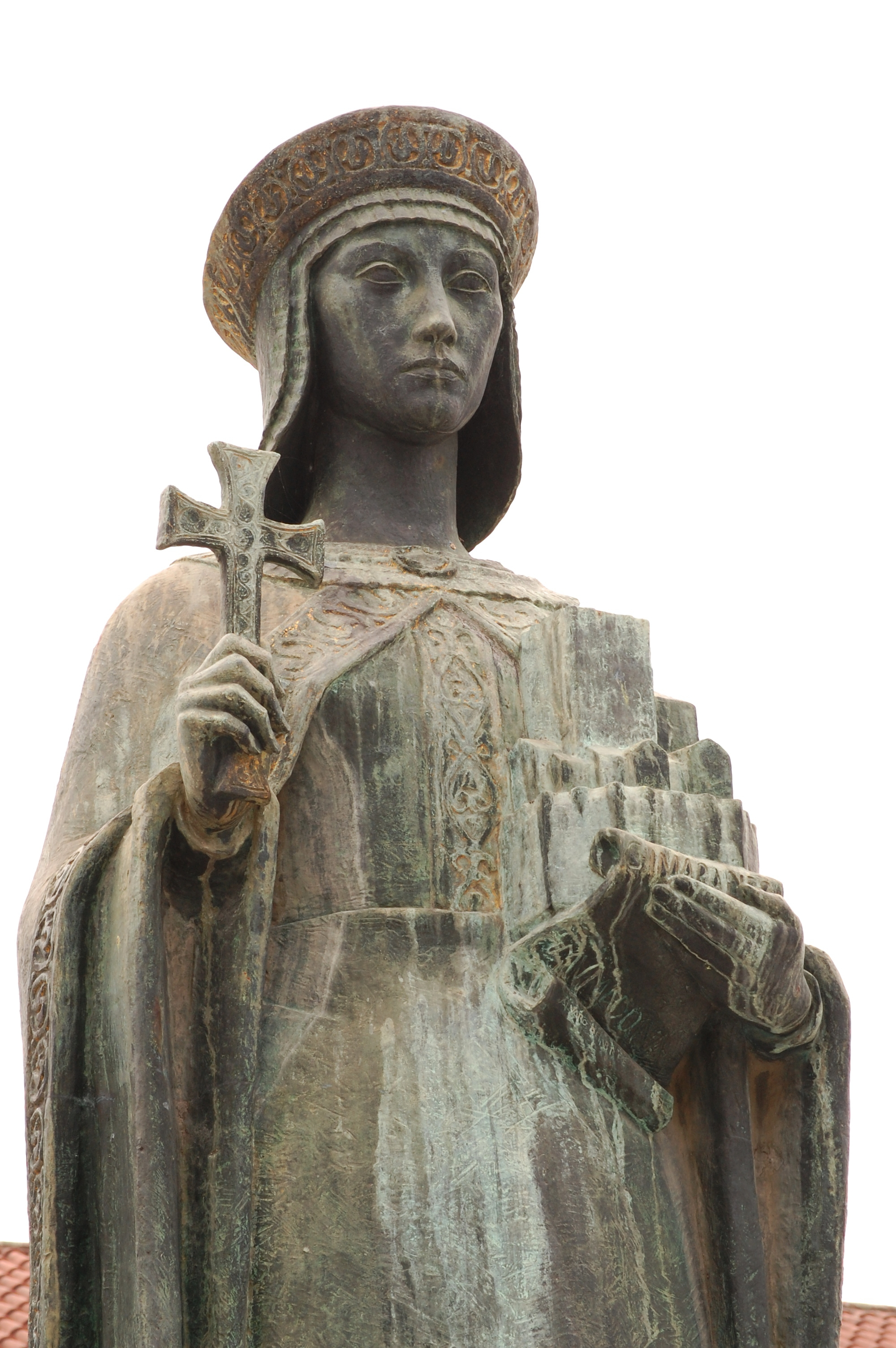
- Statue of Mumadona in Guimarães

Count of Portucale
- Tenure: c. 924-950
- Predecessor: Lucídio Vimaranes
- Successor: Gonzalo Menéndez
- Died: 968
- Spouse: Hermenegildo González
- Issue: Gonzalo Menéndez
- Father: Diogo Fernandes

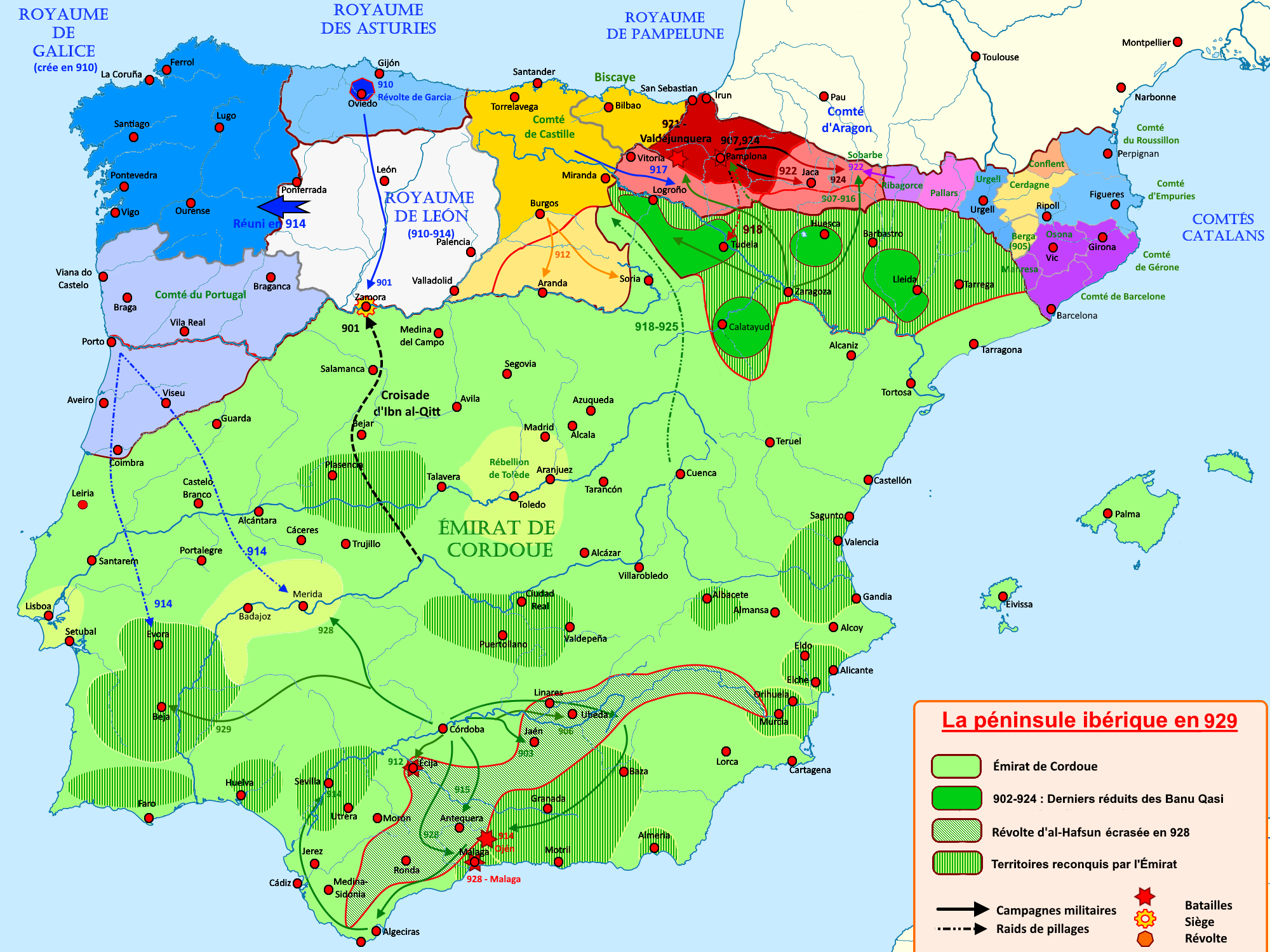
Iberian Peninsula in 929 showing the County of Portugal

Mumadona Dias, or Muniadomna Díaz (died 968), was a Galician noble and Countess of Portugal, who ruled the county jointly with her husband from about c. 920 and then on her own after her husband's death around 950 until her death in 968. Celebrated, rich and the most powerful woman in the Northwest of the Iberian Peninsula, she has been commemorated by several Portuguese cities.

== Life ==
She was one of the three daughters of Count Diogo Fernandes and of countess Onega (or Onecca) who had been the tutors of the future King Ramiro II of León. (Note: Her mother Onega could have been a member of the royal house of Pamplona due to the Basque-Navarrese origin of her name and that of her son Jimeno and other descendants. It has been suggested that she could have been the daughter of Leodegundia, a probable daughter of King Ordoño I of Asturias, married to an Infante or a member of the aristocracy of the Kingdom of Pamplona.In 928, she appears at the Monastery of Lorvão with her four children, all mentioned, Munia, Ledegundia, Ximeno and Mummadomna making a donation for the soul of Veremudo dive memorie, referring to Infante Bermudo Ordóñez, son of Ordoño I, who would have been the brother of Leodegundia, and therefore, Onega's uncle. This charter was also confirmed by Hermenegildo González, Mumadona's husband, and by Rodrigo Tedoniz, who was probably married to Onega's daughter Leodegundia. In 959, Mumadona ex regio sanguine orta (of royal blood), made a donation to the Monastery of Lorvão.) Between 915 and 920 and, most certainly by 926—the year in which they appear together for the first time when King Ramiro II gave the couple the villa of Creximir near Guimarães— she married Count Hermenegildo González.

Hermenegildo died between 943 and 950, and Mumadona governed the county alone after her husband's death. She left it in the ownership of countless domains, in an area that coincided reasonably with zones that would integrate the back counties of Portugal and of Coimbra.

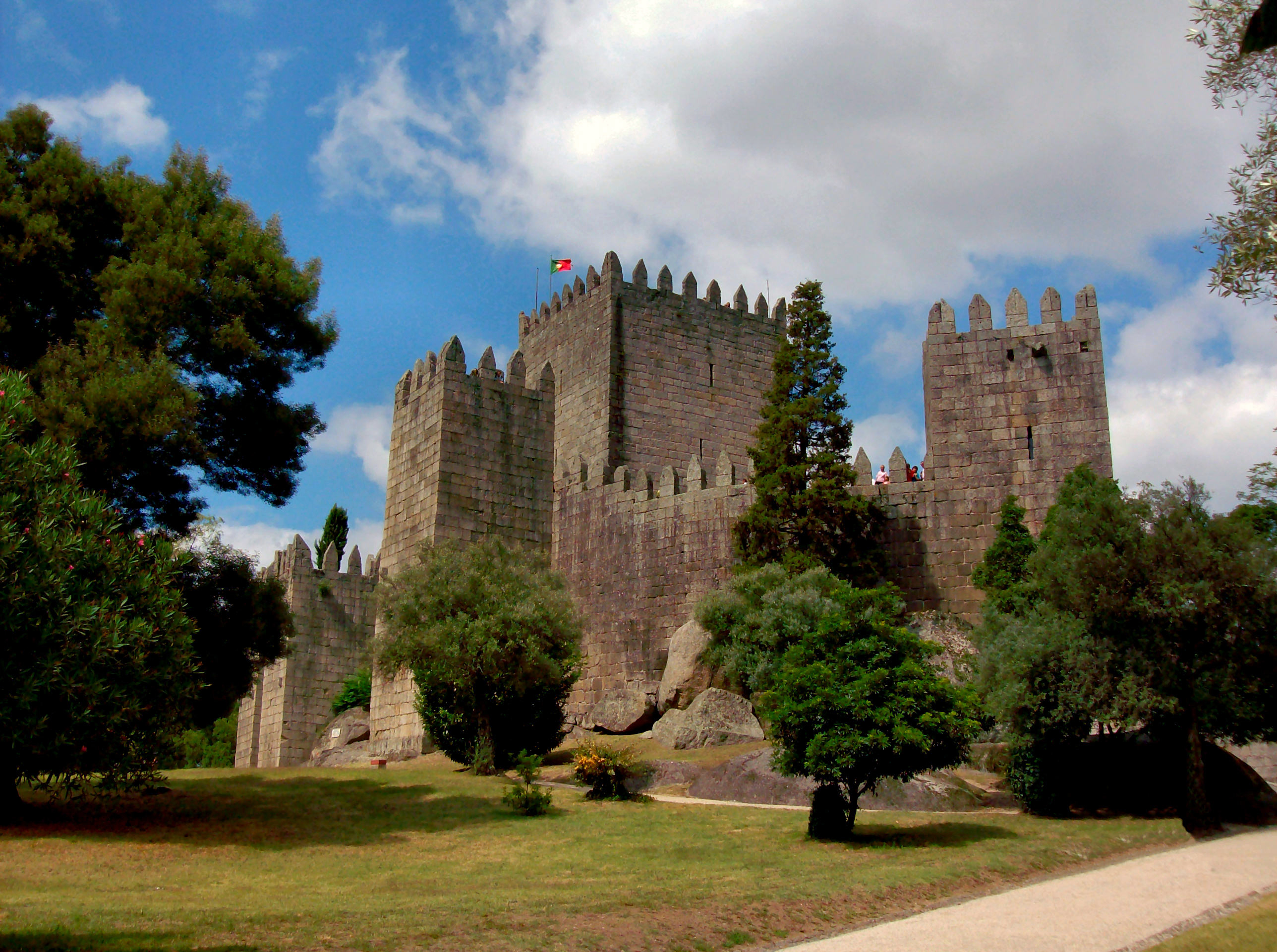
Guimarães Castle, built by Mumadona

Those domains were divided in July 950 among her six children, giving Gonzalo Menéndez the county of Portugal. In 950 or 951, with divine inspiration, she founded, on her property in Vimaranes, a monastery under São Mamede's invocation (Mosteiro of São Mamede or Mosteiro of Guimarães). Later she professed her vows there. To protect this monastery and its people from Viking raids, she initiated the construction of the Castle of Guimarães, in the shade of which Guimarães' burgh was developed, and due to the constant raids, in 968 she gave this castle to the monastery for its protection. Eventually this became the headquarters of the court of the counts of Portugal.

The testamentary document in which she makes the donation of her domains, cattle, incomes, religious objects and books to Guimarães monastery, dated 26 January 959, was important for verifying the existence of several castles and villages in the region.

== Bibliography ==
- Amaral, Luís Carlos (2009). "O povoamento da terra bracarense durante o século XIII" (PDF). Revista da Faculdade de Letras: História. Seríe III, vol. 10. Universidade do Porto: 113–127. ISSN 0871-164X.
- Cardozo, Mário (1962). "Sería Mumadona tia de Ramiro II, Rei de Leão?" (PDF). Revista de Guimarães (in Portuguese). Vol. 72, no. 2–3. Sociedade Martins Sarmento. pp. 376–391. Archived from the original (PDF) on 2015-09-23.
- Cardozo, Mário (1967). "O Testamento de Mumadona, fundadora do Mosteiro e Castelo de Guimarães na segunda metade do século X" (PDF). Revista de Guimarães (in Portuguese). 77 (3–4). Sociedade Martins Sarmento: 279–298.
- García Álvarez, Manuel Rubén (1960). "¿La Reina Velasquita, nieta de Muniadomna Díaz?" (PDF). Revista de Guimarães (in Spanish). No. 70. pp. 197–230. Archived from the original (PDF) on 2013-10-06.
- Herculano, Alexandre (1868). Academia de Ciencias de Lisboa (ed.). Portugaliae Monumenta Historica: Diplomata et chartae. Vol. I. Lisbon: Olisipone. OCLC 504624362.
- Mattoso, José (1970). "A nobreza portucalense dos séculos IX a XI" (PDF). Do tempo e da história (in Portuguese). No. III. Lisbon: Instituto de alta cultura. Centro de estudos históricos. pp. 35–50.
- Mattoso, José (1981). "As famílias condais portucalenses dos séculos X e XII". A nobreza medieval portuguesa: a família e o poder (in Portuguese). Originally published in Studium Generale 12 (1968-1969) pp. 59–115. Lisbon: Editorial Estampa. pp. 101–157. OCLC 8242615.
- Sáez, Emilio (1947). "Los ascendientes de San Rosendo: notas para el estudio de la monarquía astur-leonesa durante los siglos IX y X". Hispania: revista española de Historia (in Spanish). No. XXX. Madrid: CSIC, Instituto Jerónimo Zurita. pp. 139–156. OCLC 682814356.
- Torres Sevilla-Quiñones de León, Margarita Cecilia (1999). Linajes nobiliarios de León y Castilla: Siglos IX-XIII (in Spanish). Salamanca: Junta de Castilla y León, Consejería de educación y cultura. ISBN 84-7846-781-5.
