= Igreja de Nossa Senhora da Oliveira =

Collegiate church in Guimarães, Portugal

Coordinates: 41.44294°N 8.29255°W

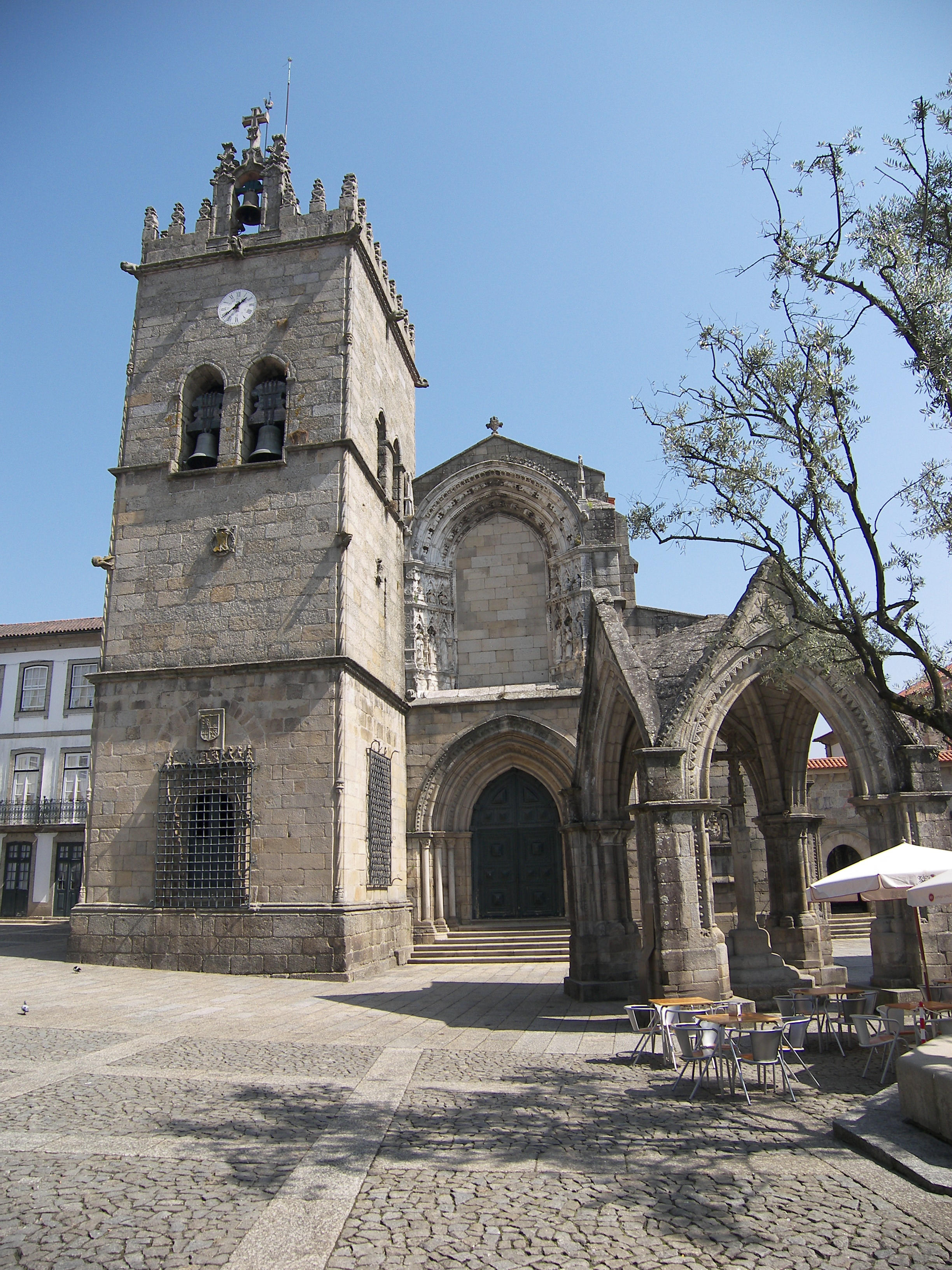
Exterior of Igreja de Nossa Senhora da Oliveira

Igreja de Nossa Senhora da Oliveira is a collegiate church in Guimarães, Portugal. It is classified as a National Monument and is part of the UNESCO World Heritage Site of Guimarães.

== History ==
The church was founded as a double monastery in about 949 by Countess Mumadona Dias, the widow of Count Hermenegildo González. It was donated to the Catholic Church by King Ramiro II. In 1074/1075, Pope Gregory VII prohibited double monasteries and by 1089 the monastery transitioned to a single monastery. Around 1139, the monastery was turned into the collegiate church Colegiada de Nossa Senhora da Oliveira. The collegiate church was shut down in 1911, but reopened in 1967.

== Gallery ==
Exterior of the bell tower and church facade

Detail of Gothic stone sculptures on the exterior niche of the church

Gothic-Romanesque entrance portal of the Igreja de Nossa Senhora da Oliveira

The pipe organ situated above the entrance loft of the church

Interior of the church

High altar
