= Chronicon Lusitanum =

Chronicle of the history of Portugal

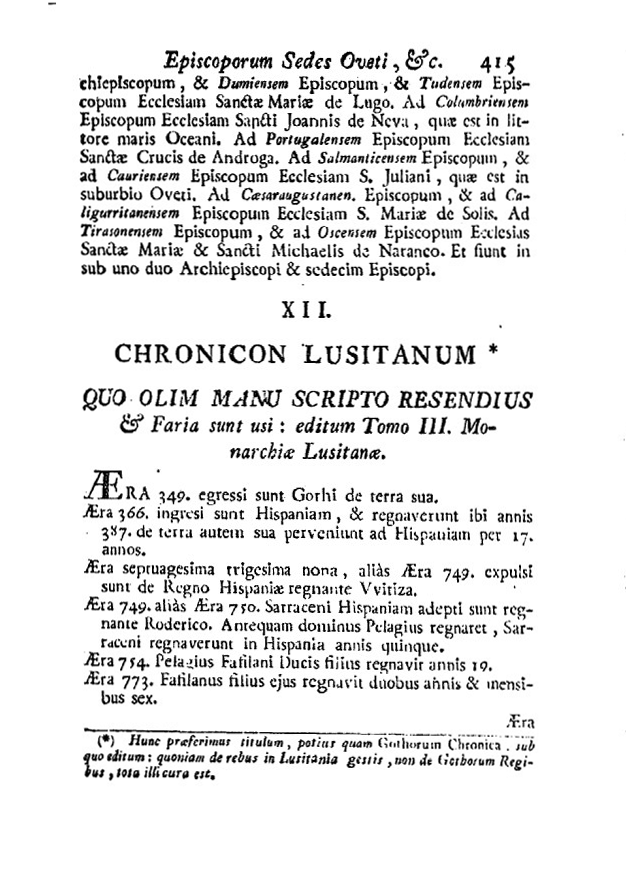
Chronicon Lusitanum

The Chronicon Lusitanum or Lusitano (also Chronica Lusitana or Chronica/Chronicon Gothorum) is a chronicle of the history of Portugal from the earliest migrations of the Visigoths (which it dates to 311) through the reign of Portugal's first king, Afonso Henriques (1139–85). The entries in the chronicle, ordered by year and dated by the Spanish Era, get increasingly longer and the majority of the text deals with the reign of Afonso. The conventional title of the chronicle means "Lusitanian (i.e. Portuguese) chronicle" or "chronicle of the Goths". It was first given by the editor Enrique Flórez, who rejected the title under which it had previously been edited (Gothorum Chronica) because of its subject matter. Flórez also claims that the manuscript of the Chronicon had previously been utilised by André de Resende, the first archaeologist of Portugal, and Manuel Severim de Faria, the first journalist of Portugal; it was also edited in the third volume of the Monarchia Lusitana by António Brandão (1632).

== Excerpts ==
311. The Goths left their homeland.

328. They entered Hispania, and they reigned there 387 years. From their own land to Spain took them seventeen years.

...

1008. On 6 October Count Menendo was killed.

1016. On 6 September the Northmen came to the "Castle of Vermudo", which is in the province of Braga. The count there was then Alvito Nunes.

1018. The lord king Alfonso [V of León] died at Viseu [1028 recte]. And in this year died the great count Nuño Álvarez.

1034. On 14 October Gonçalo Trastamires took Montemor-o-Velho and restored it to the Christians.

1039. On 1 September Gonçalo Trastamires was killed at Avenoso.

...

1128. As his father the lord Count Henry died while this child [Afonso Henriques] was only two or three years of age, certain undignified foreigners [led by Fernando Pérez de Traba] came to the kingdom of Portugal, with the consent of his mother Queen Dona Teresa, who desired to take the place of her husband and her son in the affairs of the realm. Since such a dishonorable injury he [Afonso] could never bear (being already grown up and well-formed), he invited his friends and the more noble men of Portugal, who much preferred his rule to that of his mother or of the ignoble foreigners who wished to dispossess him, and he met them to battle in the field of São Mamede, which is beside the castle of Guimarães, and they were fought and defeated by him, and they fled from his face, and he captured them. He [thus] obtained the government and the kingship of the realm of Portugal.

...

1162. On 30 November during the night of Saint Andrew the Apostle the men of the king of Portugal, Dom Afonso, led by Fernão Gonçalves and other cavaleiros vilões invested the city of Pace, that is, Beja at night, and bravely captured it, and the Christians possessed it in the thirty-fifth year of his [Afonso’s] reign.

1166. The city of Évora was captured and devastated and entered at night by Gerald, called ‘without fear’, and his fellow bandits, and he handed it over to the king Dom Afonso. Shortly after this king seized Moura and Serpa and Alconchel, and he ordered the castle of Coruche rebuilt in the thirty-ninth year of his reign.

1168. King Dom Afonso and his army were defeated at Badajoz in the forty-first year of his reign.

== Editions ==
- Enrique Flórez. España Sagrada (Madrid: 1796), XIV:415–32. (in Latin)
- Marc Szwajcer, trans. Chronique de Lusitanie. French translation based on Flórez's edition. (in French)
- A partial English translation can be found in Lucas Villegas-Aristizábal, "Revisiting the Anglo-Norman Crusaders' Failed Attempt to Conquer Lisbon c. 1142" Portuguese Studies 29:1 (2013): 7–20.
