= Vímara Peres =

Count of Portugal

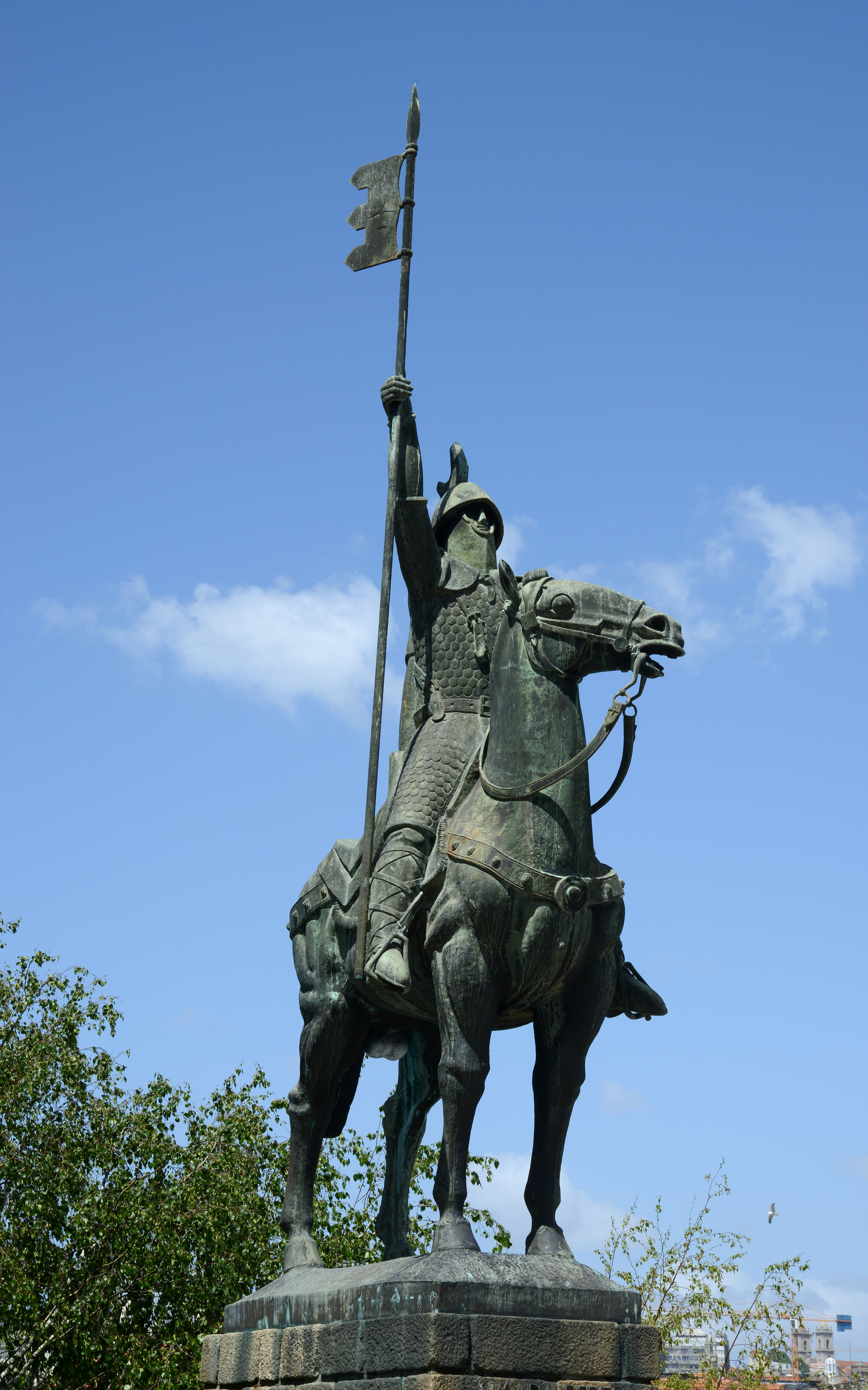
- Equestrian statue of Vímara Peres in Porto

Count of Portucale
- Tenure: 868–873
- Successor: Lucídio Vimaranes
- Died: 873; Vama (possibly Guimarães or Bama, A Coruña)
- Spouse: Trudildi
- Issue: Lucídio Vimaranes, Audivia Vimaranes
- Father: Pedro Theon

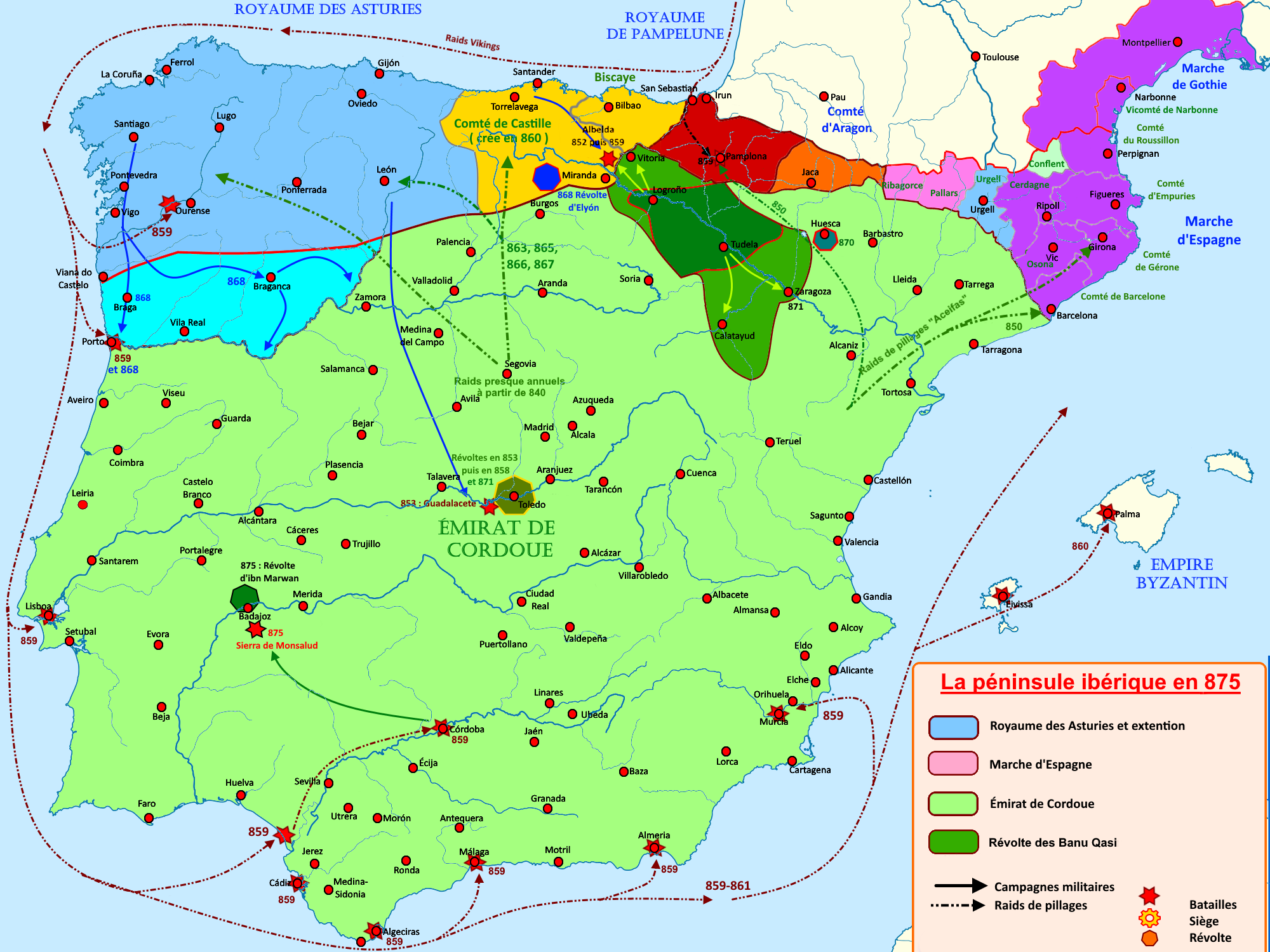
The Iberian Peninsula in 875, shortly after the reign of Vímara Peres

Vímara Peres (Note: Vímara is an originally Visigothic name of Germanic origin (cognate with Weimar or Guimar) and Peres is a patronymic, meaning son of Pedro or Peter. The name can therefore be equated with Weimar/Guimar Peterson.) (died in Galicia, 873) was a ninth-century nobleman who served as the first Count of Portugal.

== Life ==
=== Family ===
His father, Pedro Theon (d. after 867), sometimes called Pedro Theón of Pravia, and possibly the son of Bermudo I of Asturias, was a member of the Curia Regis of King Alfonso III and appears in January 867 confirming a royal charter jointly with other nobles, including Count Rodrigo of Castile. Pedro was actively involved in the Reconquista and was also responsible for ousting and defeating the Vikings when they invaded Galicia in 858. Besides Vímara, Pedro was also the father of Hermenegildo Peres. The old Christian version of ‘Vímara’ is believed to be derived from ‘Weimar’ a name from any of several places like one Weimar in Hesse and another in Thuringia, from Old High German wīh "holy" and mari "standing water". Although old-fashioned, it is still used in Portugal today as Guímaro.

=== Count ===
Vímara was a vassal of the King of Asturias, Alfonso III, and was sent to reconquer and secure from the Moors (Arabs and Berbers who had occupied Visigothic Hispania), in the west coastal fringe of Gallaecia, the area from the Minho River to the Douro River, including the city of Portus Cale, later Porto and Gaia, from where the name of Portugal emerged.

The Kingdom of Asturias was divided internally into several counties or royal provinces. Portus Cale was one of these Asturian counties. In 868, Vímara Peres was named Count of Portugal by King Alfonso III after the reconquest of the region north of the Douro river. Later Portuguese historians viewed this event as the earliest milestone in the history of the state of Portugal, although Portugal did not achieve independence until the 12th century.

He was able to expel the Moors and founded a fortified town under his own name Vimaranis (of Vimar) which later became Guimaranis, present-day Guimarães (the Portuguese call it "The Cradle City"). Vímara Peres died in 873 in Vama, possibly identified as Guimarães or Bama in the territory of Touro, A Coruña.

=== Issue ===
Most historians agree that he was the father of:

- Lucídio Vimaranes (Lucídio, son of Vímara), who succeeded Vímara as the governor of the county.

Although the identity of his wife was not recorded in any contemporary charters, her name could have been Trudildi. If that was the case, Vímara would have been the father of:

- Audivia Vimaranes who was married to Count Gutierre Aloítez. (Note: Count Gutierre Aloítez (died after 963) is recorded with a wife named Audivia, whose parents were named Vimara and Trudildi. Trudildi is a name quite frequent among the nobility of Portugal and Galicia in the middle of the 10th-century, but Vimara is not. For chronological reasons and because of this uncommon name, historian Margarita Torres Sevilla-Quiñones de León believes that Audivia was the daughter of Count Vímara Peres, and thus Vímara's wife was this Trudildi, Audivia's mother.)

== See also ==
- Portugal in the Middle Ages
  - Portugal in the Reconquista

== Bibliography ==
- Martínez Díez, Gonzalo (2005). El Condado de Castilla (711-1038): la historia frente a la leyenda (in Spanish). Valladolid. ISBN 84-9718-275-8.
- Mattoso, José (1981). "As famílias condais portucalenses dos séculos X e XI". A nobreza medieval portuguesa, a família e o poder (in Portuguese). Lisbon: Editorial Estampa. OCLC 8242615.
- Miguens Narvaiz, Silvia (2010). Breve historia de los piratas (in Spanish). Madrid: Ediciones Nowtilus, S.L. ISBN 9788497637091.
- Sáez, Emilio (1947). "Los ascendientes de San Rosendo: notas para el estudio de la monarquía astur-leonesa durante los siglos IX y X". Hispania: revista española de Historia (in Spanish). No. XXX. Madrid: CSIC, Instituto Jerónimo Zurita. pp. 139–156. OCLC 682814356.
- Torres Sevilla-Quiñones de León, Margarita Cecilia (1999). Linajes nobiliarios de León y Castilla: Siglos IX-XIII (in Spanish). Salamanca: Junta de Castilla y León, Consejería de educación y cultura. ISBN 84-7846-781-5.
- Torres Sevilla-Quiñones de León, Margarita Cecilia (1998). "Relaciones Fronterizas entre Portugal y León en tiempos de Alfonso VII: El ejemplo de la Casa de Traba" (PDF). Revista da Faculdade de Letras: História. Universidade do Porto (in Spanish). No. 15, 2. Porto. pp. 301–312. ISSN 0871-164X.

New title	Count of Portucale; 868–873	Succeeded by Lucídio Vimaranes
