= José Mattoso =

Portuguese historian (1933–2023)

José Mattoso GOSE
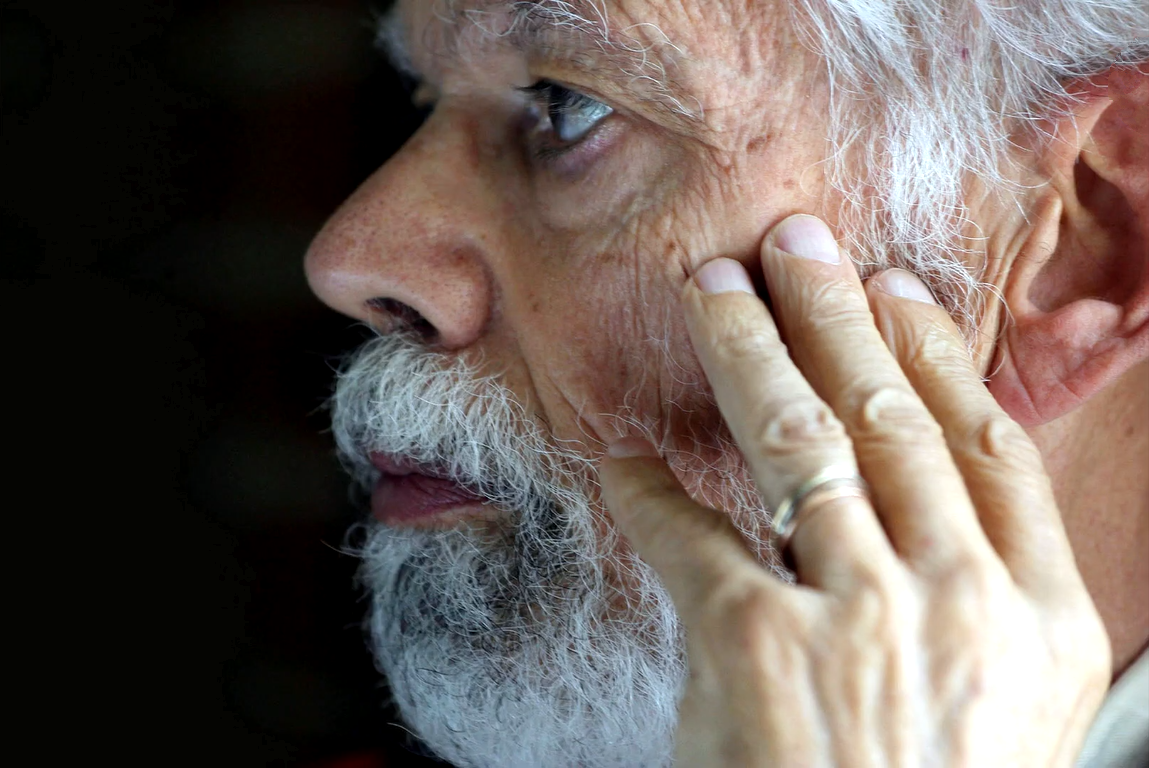
- Born: 22 January 1933; Leiria, Portugal
- Died: 8 July 2023 (aged 90)
- Occupations: Historian, author, professor, medievalist

José João da Conceição Gonçalves Mattoso GOSE (22 January 1933 – 8 July 2023) was a Portuguese medievalist and university professor.

== Biography ==
Mattoso was born on 22 January 1933. He earned his doctoral degree in medieval history from the Catholic University of Leuven, in Belgium, in 1966 (with a thesis on the abbey of Pendorada - "L'Abbaye de Pendorada : des Origines à 1160"), while he was Benedictine monk at the Abbey of Singeverga. He returned to secular life in 1970, and taught at the University of Lisbon and at the New University of Lisbon. He was also a director of National Archives / Torre do Tombo.

Mattoso was recognised in Portugal and internationally as one of the most distinguished scholars of the history of medieval Portugal, and much of his scholarly work is largely devoted to that period. His works include, among others, "Ricos homens, Infanções e Cavaleiros" (on the medieval society), "Fragments of a Medieval Composition" (in response to the arguments of Antonio Borges Coelho), and "Identification of A country Essay on the Origins of Portugal (1096–1325)" (Vol. I - 'Opposition' vol. II - 'Composition'), with five editions constantly revised and updated between 1985 and 1995. Mattoso was awarded the Alfredo Pimenta prize of Medieval History, and the non-fiction Prize of Pen club for this work. He was also awarded the Fernando Pessoa Prize in 1987, among other important distinctions.

Mattoso acted as the scientific editor of a History of Portugal (1993–1995) in eight volumes.

José Mattoso died on 8 July 2023, at the age of 90.

== Bibliography ==
- Le monarchisme ibérique et Cluny. Les monastères du diocése de Porto de l'an mille à 1200, 1968
- As famílias condais portucalenses dos séculos X e XI, 1970
- Beneditina Lusitana, 1974
- Livro de linhagens do Conde D. Pedro, ed. crítica, 1980
- Livros velhos de linhagens, ed. crítica por Joseph Piel e José Mattoso, 1980
- A nobreza medieval portuguesa. A família e o poder, 1981; 1994
- Ricos-Homens, infanções e cavaleiros. A nobreza medieval portuguesa nos sécs. XI e XII, 1982; 1998
- Religião e cultura na Idade Média portuguesa, 1982; 1997
- Narrativas dos Livros de Linhagens, selecção, introdução e comentários, 1983
- Portugal medieval. Novas interpretações, 1985; 1992
- O essencial sobre a formação da nacionalidade, 1985; 1986
- Identificação de um país. Ensaio sobre as origens de Portugal, 1096–1325, 1985; 1995
- O essencial sobre a cultura medieval portuguesa, 1985; 1993
- A escrita da história, 1986
- Fragmentos de uma composição medieval, 1987; 1990
- O essencial sobre os provérbios medievais portugueses, 1987
- A escrita da História. Teoria e métodos, 1988; 1997
- O castelo e a feira. A Terra de Santa Maria nos séculos XI a XIII, em colab. com Amélia Andrade, Luís Krus, 1989
- Almada no tempo de D. Sancho I (Comunicação), 1991
- Os primeiros reis (História de Portugal - Vol. I) (Infanto-juvenil), com Ana Maria Magalhães, Isabel Alçada, 1993; 2001
- A Terra de Santa Maria no século XIII. Problemas e documentos, em colab. com Amélia Andrade, Luís Krus, 1993
- No Reino de Portugal (História de Portugal - Vol. II) (Infanto-juvenil), com Ana Maria Magalhães, Isabel Alçada, 1994; 2003 Coja, 1995
- Tempos de revolução (História de Portugal - Vol. III) (Infanto-juvenil), com Ana Maria Magalhães, Isabel Alçada, 1995
- O reino dos mortos na Idade Média peninsular, ed. lit., 1996
- A Identidade Nacional, 1998; 2003
- A função social da História no mundo de hoje, 1999
- A dignidade. Konis Santana e a resistência timorense, 2005
- D. Afonso Henriques, 2007
- Levantar o Céu. Os labirintos da sabedoria, 2012
- Naquele Tempo. Ensaios de História Medieval; 2009;2014

== Distinctions ==
=== National orders ===
- Grand Officer of the Order of Saint James of the Sword (10 June 1992)
