= Battle of Trancoso (1140) =

1140 battle in Portugal

- Part of Portuguese Reconquista
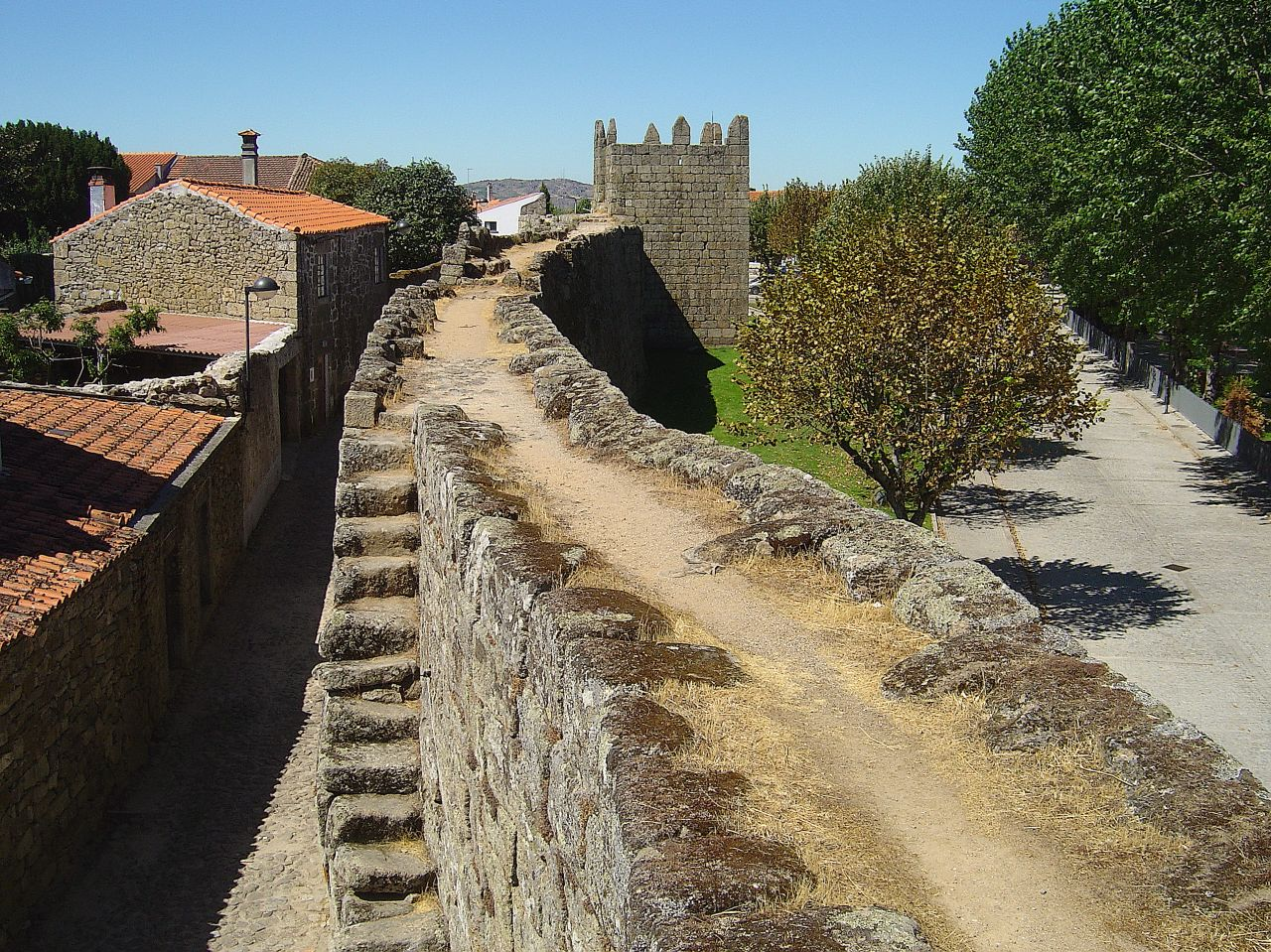
Date	1140
Location	Trancoso, Portugal
Result	Portuguese victory

Belligerents
Kingdom of Portugal	Almoravids

Commanders and leaders
Afonso I of Portugal	Esmar

The Battle of Trancoso occurred in 1140 during the Reconquista when Afonso I of Portugal defeated a contingent of Almoravid raiders near Trancoso in Portuguese territory.

== Background ==
In December 1135, Afonso began the construction of a defensive fort at Leiria, south of the Mondego River in the unstable territory approximately halfway between Coimbra and the powerful Muslim fortress at Santarém. Leiria would serve Afonso as a defensive outpost to protect Coimbra and as a forward base by which the Portuguese could strike out and raid Santarém.

In 1137, while the newly built Castle of Leiria was under the command of Paio Guterres, a large force of Almoravids and Andalusians launched an attack on the fortress. The fortress was captured by the Muslims and razed, but rebuilt by the Portuguese in subsequent years.

In 1139, at the Battle of Ourique, the Portuguese defeated Almoravid troops commanded by a certain "Esmar." The following year, Afonso renewed hostilities against his cousin Afonso VII, the King of León and Castile and invaded Galicia. Aware that Afonso was in Galicia suffering setbacks, Esmar assembled his troops and attacked the rebuilt Castle of Leiria; captured the garrison and took captives; and razed the fortress in a manner strikingly similar to the attack of the Almoravids and Andalusians three years earlier. Esmar then advanced deeper into Portuguese territory until reaching the town of Trancoso, which he attacked and captured.

== The Battle ==
After Esmar attacked and captured Trancoso, the Almoravids occupied the town for a length of time before they razed the structures and began their journey back south to Santarém.

After Afonso learned of the attacks on Leiria and Trancoso, however, he quickly signed a truce with his cousin and traveled with his army from Galicia to the northern portion of his kingdom. Near Trancoso, Afonso’s forces caught up with Esmar and the Almoravids. In the battle that ensued, Afonso and the Portuguese decimated the Muslim force that had raided and destroyed Trancoso.

== Aftermath ==
Following the victory at Trancoso, Afonso and his army pursued the remaining Almoravid force that fled from the first battle; caught them near the town of Tarouca; clashed with them a second time; and largely eliminated the last of the raiders.

In the aftermath of the battle, Afonso founded the Monastery of Tarouca in the presence of his troops.

== See also ==
- Portugal in the Middle Ages
- Military history of Portugal
- Reconquista
- Portugal in the Reconquista
- Battle of Trancoso (1384)
