= Capture of Leiria (1137) =

- Part of Reconquista
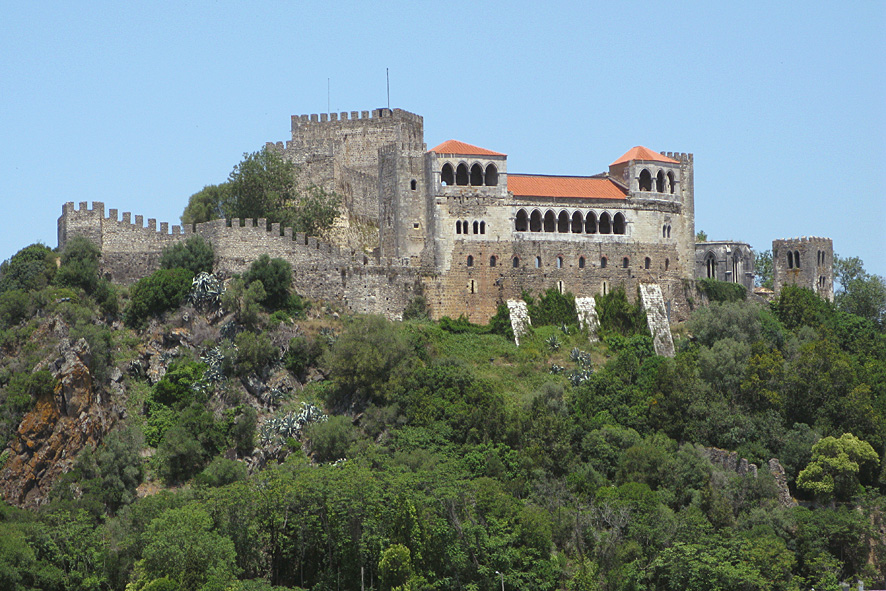
- Leiria castle
Date	1137
Location	Leiria
Result	Almoravid victory

Belligerents
Almoravids	County of Portugal

Commanders and leaders
Unknown	Paio Guterres

Strength
Unknown	Unknown

Casualties and losses
Unknown	250 killed (Leiria); Unknown at Nabão River

The Capture of Leiria was a military engagement between the Almoravids and the Portuguese at the fortress of Leiria. The Almoravids were victorious and sacked Leiria.

== Background ==
After the siege of Coimbra in 1117, both the Portuguese and the Almoravids decreased their major campaigns against each other and entered into a somewhat “silent period” for two decades. Ali ibn Yusuf, the Almoravid Emir, withdrew his forces to Seville to guard against the growing threat of the Almohad movement in North Africa. Countess Teresa of Portugal, serving as regent for her son Afonso Henriques, concerned herself with succession issues.

During this time, the border between the County of Portugal and the Almoravids fell back to the Mondego River, a natural division between the two polities. Conflict between the two powers consisted exclusively of small-scale, rapid strike, frontier raids conducted in the spring and summer by both parties. The raids were generally designed to destroy defensive outposts; ambush caravans; steal livestock and grain; take captives; and generally disrupt each other’s economy and resolve. The territory surrounding Coimbra was often the subject of attack due to the city’s location on the Mondego River.

In 1128, Afonso Henriques took control of Portugal from his mother. In the following years, Afonso increased the frequency of the raids on the Muslims and organized the raids into a “weapon of the state.” In December 1135, Afonso began the construction of a defensive fort at Leiria, south of the Mondego River in the unstable territory approximately halfway between Coimbra and the powerful Muslim fortress at Santarém. Leiria would serve Afonso as a defensive outpost to protect Coimbra and as a forward base by which the Portuguese could strike out at Santarém.

After the completion of Leiria, Afonso put Paio Guterres, a dedicated knight known for his exploits, in charge of the outpost. During his tenure, Paio made many daring raids into Muslim territory, causing a great amount of destruction and unsettling the Almoravids. The raids launched from Leiria were so effective at harassing the Muslims that the Almoravids felt compelled to launch an attack on the outpost of Leiria in 1137 while Afonso was preoccupied in Galicia campaigning against his cousin, Alfonso VII of León.

== The Battle ==
In 1137, a large Muslim force composed of both Almoravids and Andalusians launched an attack on the Leiria fortress as a direct response to the successful raids conducted by the Portuguese from that outpost.

The Muslims besieged the Christian fortress at the outset, but quickly began to directly attack the walls of the outpost. The Portuguese garrison fought bravely, however, they weren't able to defend themselves against the attackers who had numerical superiority. Eventually the Muslims were able to enter the city, overwhelm the Portuguese, and capture the fortress.

Over 250 Portuguese knights and men-at-arms were killed. Paio was able to escape the fortress and make his way back to Portugal. The fortress was sacked and destroyed. As soon as the news of the attack reached local Portuguese commanders, a relief force was assembled and attempted to reach Leiria. The relief force, however, seemed to have been stopped and forced to retreat at the Nabão River approximately 30 kilometers from Leiria.

== Aftermath ==
Reports of the loss of Leiria created a shock in Portugal. In time, Afonso was forced to abandon his campaign in Galicia, make peace with the Leonese, and return to the south to avenge the defeat at Leiria. The fortress was rebuilt later, but in 1140, it was destroyed once again by the Almoravids.
