= Fernando Yáñez =

Galician nobleman

Fernando Yáñez (flourished 1112–1157) was a minor Galician nobleman—a miles, or mere knight—who rose in rank in the service of Queen Urraca (1109–26) and King Alfonso VII (1126–57). (Note: Alfonso was proclaimed king in Galicia in opposition to Urraca in 1111. After inheriting the whole kingdom in 1126, he generally preferred the title of "emperor" to that of "king". Fernando Yáñez was a partisan of Urraca until her death.) He eventually became the royal military commander charged with the defence of the Limia on the border between Galicia and Portugal. Contemporary sources call him the "prince" and "duke" of Limia.

== Parentage ==
Yáñez (or Eanes) is a patronymic meaning "son of John". Fernando's father was Juan Ramírez, a vicar (vicarius) of Count Raymond of Galicia. In 1095 he was charged, as Raymond's merino, with delimiting the estate of the bishopric of Tui. In August 1097 he, as vicar, was helping Raymond secure his authority over the region of Toroño, since the county of Portugal just south of Toroño had recently been taken from Raymond and bestowed on Henry of Burgundy. In 1099 Juan was acting in Jallas at the same time as he was serving as villicus in Salnés. He had a sister, Mayor, who was married to Luzo Arias, and perhaps also a brother named Alfonso. He can be traced in the records of the monastery of San Lorenzo de Carboeiro from 1095 to 1102. Between 1105 and 1123 he signed nine royal charters. Through his sister's marriage, Juan was related to the Galician knight Arias Pérez.

Although Fernando is much praised in the Chronica Adefonsi imperatoris (Chronicle of Emperor Alfonso") and the Prefatio de Almaria ("Poem of Almería"), nothing is known of his parents with certainty and he was probably born into the lower class of nobility. His mother may have been Toda Raimúndez, according to a document of the monastery of San Pedro de Rocas. He initially rose to prominence as one of the only Galician nobles to support Urraca when her influence there was at low ebb. Despite his royal preferment, Fernando is never recorded with the title of count (Latin comes), the highest rank attainable in León. (Note: Reilly 1982, p. 163, believes that the "Count Fernando" who confirmed a charter of Countess Theresa of Portugal to Bishop Diego III and the people of Ourense on 17 February 1122 was Fernando Yáñez.)

== Early service under Urraca ==
Fernando is first recorded in a document emanating from the royal court on 9 March 1112. In 1120, or perhaps as early as 1115/6, in order to break the power of Pedro Fróilaz de Traba, count of Galicia since 1109, Urraca gave Diego Gelmírez, the archbishop of Santiago de Compostela, the "lordship of all Galicia" (totius Gallaeciae dominium) and ordered the leading men (principes) of Galicia to do homage to him. Fernando Yáñez was among the named princes, along with Arias Pérez, Bermudo Suárez and Juan Díaz. Urraca herself pledge to be Diego's "faithful ally" (fidelis amica). This agreement is reported in the Historia compostellana, a contemporary account of Diego's episcopate. It was apparently mediated by two foreigners, Abbot Henry of Saint-Jean d'Angély and Stephen, chamberlain of the abbey of Cluny. This strange agreement between queen, archbishop and some Galician leaders does not seem to have prejudiced the rights of either Pedro Fróilaz or his charge, the future Alfonso VII, already crowned king of Galicia, but merely to have counterbalanced them. In 1121 on the orders of Queen Urraca, Fernando and his father, Juan Ramírez, in collaboration with Arias Pérez and Juan Díaz, arrested Diego for refusing to participate in the war against Theresa, Countess of Portugal.

In 1126, "incited," according to the Historia, "by tyrannical ferocity and stimulated by avarice," Fernando imprisoned some citizens of Santiago. The archbishop, who claimed secular jurisdiction in the city, thereupon excommunicated him and pillaged his lordship of Puente Sampayo, which lay on the border between the dioceses of Tui and Santiago de Compostela. In April 1127, with the other Galician and Extremaduran nobles, made formal submission to Alfonso as Urraca's successor at Zamora. In the long list of men who came to Zamora in the Chronica Adefonsi imperatoris, the last two names are those of Fernando and his father-in-law, Count Gómez Núñez: "... and Count Gómez Núñez and Fernando Yáñez ... came to the king in Zamora and with humble devotion placed themselves under his authority." Together Gómez and Fernando dominated the south Galician borderlands.

== Military service to Alfonso ==
Fernando was one of the Galicians most trusted by the crown, and he attended court frequently under Alfonso VII, confirming roughly one hundred of Alfonso's over nine hundred charters, or ten percent. Nevertheless, he was not a courtier, but a military man and the majority of royal charters he witnessed were issued while the king was on campaign. In 1133 Alfonso used Fernando as a go-between during negotiations with Diego Gelmírez, when the latter wanted to dismiss his chancellor. When Alfonso visited Galicia in 1137, Fernando's presence with him is attested by his witnessing the royal charters of 26–7 June at Tuy and 17 and 29 July at Santiago.

In royal service he was primarily a soldier. In the 1130s he resisted the Portuguese invasion of Galicia. About 1139, Fernando was in command of the Limia and in that capacity leading the defence against Portugal. According to the Chronica Adefonsi:

Fernando Juanes, the commander at Limia [Ferdinandus Joannis princeps Limiae], accompanied by other followers of the Emperor, waged war daily against the King of Portugal. He engaged him in battle and fought bravely. In fact, the King himself was wounded by a spear which one of Fernando's soldiers daringly hurled at him. He suffered for several days, but his physicians healed him. In the campaign Count Fernando took many spoils from the King's nobles.

In 1139 Fernando was at the siege of Oreja, where he witnessed a royal charter on 25 July along with several other Galician noblemen. In 1141 Fernando joined the royal court at Zamora, simultaneous with Alfonso's grant of the castle of Sandi to the abbey of Celanova. This grant was intended to ensure the loyalty of the abbey, since it was near the Portuguese border at a time when Count Afonso Henriques of Portugal had begun his royal pretensions. Fernando's visit was probably likewise related to the defence of Galicia from Portuguese invasion.

In 1144, after rebellion broke out in the Almoravid Emirate, Fernando took part in Alfonso's expedition south to take advantage of the discord. In 1146 he was sent with reinforcements to shore up Ibn Ḥamdīn's resistance to the Almoravids at the siege of Andújar. According to the Chronica Adefonsi:

After hearing [that Ibn Ḥamdīn could not resist much longer], Alfonso called for his faithful friend, Fernando Juanes[,] commander of Limia [fidelem amicum et ducem Limiae] and the same individual who had aided the Emperor in Limia in his war with the king of Portugal. Fernando was ordered to take as many of the Emperor's knights as he wished and go to Andújar. He and Aben Hamdin [Ibn Ḥamdīn] were to defend the city until Alfonso could arrive there. Fernando departed immediately with a large force of knights. When Aben Hamdin and the citizens of Andújar saw him entering the city, they were overjoyed. Fernando ard Aben Hamdin joined forces and fought several battles with Abengania [Ibn Gāniya]. Some of this combat took place outside the city walls. Many soldiers from both sides were killed.

Fernando's intervention ultimately forced Ibn Gāniya lifted the siege. Later that year he joined the siege of Córdoba and on 17 July 1147 was with the royal army at Andújar when he witnessed a charter of Alfonso VII. In 1147 he was present at the siege of Almería. The anonymous author of the Prefatio de Almaria, a heroic roll-call (dénombrement épique) of the participants at Almería, claims that Fernando Yáñez was never defeated in battle. Fernando witnessed the last royal charter issued at Baeza before the army set out on 19 August 1147, and again witnessed the royal charter issued on the army's victorious return on 25 November, demonstrating that he was with the army throughout the campaign. In 1151 he was at the siege of Jaén and in 1152 at that of Guadix. He thus played a conspicuous role in the Christian reconquista of the mid-twelfth century.

== Fiefs and lands ==
Fernando's reward for his service to the crown was fiefs (tenencias): the Limia in his homeland; Maqueda and Talavera, which defended the approaches to the primatial city of Toledo; and the castle of Montoro on the river Guadalquivir in the far south of the realm. These, save Limia, were frontier fiefs of utmost military importance. His most prominent post was Montoro, and he is cited as holding that fief in twenty-nine documents (two of them private charters). He held it from no later than 22 May 1150, although charters as early as 1148 and 1 December 1149 cite him as holding it. These are false, however, since Montoro had not yet been captured. (Note: The charter in which Nuño first appears as lord of Montoro is incorrectly dated to 1155 in the cartulary of the monastery of Sobrado.) Fernando held Talavera from 1143 to 1149, as three documents attest, and Maqueda from at least 1146, as one royal charters shows, until at least 1153, according to one private document.

Fernando is recorded in several suspect charters as holding other fiefs in Galicia. A spurious royal charter of 1129 makes him lord of San Pelayo de Lado, in the extreme south of the realm. This tenancy is possible, as is that of Ginzo de Limia, also in the extreme south of Galicia, which he is recorded as holding in a private charter of 8 June 1136. A private document dated 19 April 1145 cites him as sharing the lordship of Toroño (roughly coterminous with the diocese of Tui) with Count Gómez Núñez, (Note: Reilly translates comite domno Gomes as "Count Domingo Gómez".) but this charter is highly suspect. It records the grant of the church of San Martín de Loureza to an abbot named Pedro Initiense, who was forming a monastic community with some companions. Bishop Pelayo Menéndez of Tui granted the monks the church buildings as well as a tithe of the produce of the land there and in the village of Oya. This act must have occurred, not in 1145, but prior to 17 April 1139, when the king subjected the monastery of Loureza to that of Oya, which did not yet exist when Pelayo ceded his rights in the village to the nascent monastery of Loureza. Nonetheless, Fernando's co-lordship of this region is probable, since Gómez Núñez was his father-in-law.

Having secured a heightened status by his deeds on behalf of the crown, Fernando was able to marry Teresa Gómez, the daughter of a man of much higher rank than he. By her he had at least two sons, Pelayo Curvo, who continued in the service of the Leonese crown under Alfonso and Alfonso's successor, Ferdinand II (1157–88), and Varela, who was captured by the Portuguese at the Battle of Valdevez in 1140. (Note: Alfonso divided his kingdom between his sons, Ferdinand, the younger, receiving León, which included Galicia, and Sancho III, the elder, receiving Castile. Fernando Yáñez's career was spent almost entirely in Galicia and León.) He may also have had a daughter, María, who donated her lands at Cameselle, San Félix and San Pedro de Felgueiras to the Order of Saint John of Jerusalem on 4 September 1188. In the charter of donation she describes herself as a daughter of Fernandianez de Montoro.

From 1149 Fernando gave up his fiefs around Tuy to his son, and in November 1152 his son was ruling Toroño, probably having succeeded his father. Fernando is last recorded as holding Montoro on 6 February 1154. That month he had to give it up. The king had bestowed it on Nuño Pérez de Lara by 24 December 1154. On 9 June 1147, at Calatrava, while he was leading his army south to attack Almería, Alfonso VII judged a property dispute between Fernando and Bishop Martin I of Ourense (1132–56). The last recorded action of Fernando Yáñez was to donate his estate at Oliveira to the cathedral of Tui for the good of his soul and that of Queen Urraca. He had a charter drawn up to this effect on 24 August 1154. He recorded that he had received Oliveira through the generosity of the queen, and he also praised the generosity of Alfonso. Although the donation is not a will, it may have been issued at the end of his life or even on his deathbed. (In the opinion of Luis Sánchez Belda, it was probably a "death-bed testament".) The original of this charter is preserved. Archbishop Juan de Segovia and the canons of the cathedral of Toledo confirmed it.

Fernando was last at the royal court on 26 April 1157, shortly before Alfonso VII's death. He is not recorded in any document thereafter, but the exact date of his death is unknown.

== Sources ==
- Barón Faraldo, Andrés (2011). "Magnates y nobiles en la curia del conde Raimundo de Borgoña, Totius Gallecie Princeps (c. 1091–1107)" (PDF). Estudios Mindonienses. 27: 531–74. Archived from the original (PDF) on 2014-08-08.
- Barton, Simon (1997). The Aristocracy in Twelfth-century León and Castile. Cambridge: Cambridge University Press.
- Barton, Simon (2000). "From Tyrants to Soldiers of Christ: The Nobility of Twelfth-century León-Castile and the Struggle Against Islam". Nottingham Medieval Studies. 44: 28–48. doi:10.1484/J.NMS.3.305. Archived from the original on 2009-10-11.
- Barton, Simon (2006). "The 'Discovery of Aristocracy' in Twelfth-century Spain: Portraits of the Secular Élite in the Poem of Almería". Bulletin of Hispanic Studies. 83 (6): 453–68. doi:10.3828/bhs.83.6.1.
- Falque Rey, Emma (1994). Historian compostelana. Madrid: Ediciones Akal.
- Fernández Rodríguez, Manuel (2004). Toronium: Aproximación a la Historia de una Tierra Medieval: Galicia y Portugal en la Edad Media. Madrid: Consejo Superior de Investigaciones Científicas. ISBN 84-00082613.
- Fletcher, Richard A. (1984). Saint James's Catapult: The Life and Times of Diego Gelmírez of Santiago de Compostela. Oxford: Oxford University Press.
- García Tato, Isidro (2004). Las encomiendas gallegas de la Orden Militar de San Juan de Jerusalén: Estudio y edición documental. Vol. I. Santiago de Compostela: Instituto de Estudios Gallegos «Padre Sarmiento». hdl:10261/49926. ISBN 8400082508.
- Lipskey, Glenn Edward (1972). The Chronicle of Alfonso the Emperor: A Translation of the Chronica Adefonsi imperatoris, with Study and Notes (PhD dissertation). Northwestern University.
- Reilly, Bernard F. (1982). The Kingdom of León-Castilla under Queen Urraca, 1109–1126. Princeton, NJ: Princeton University Press.
- Reilly, Bernard F. (1998). The Kingdom of León-Castilla Under King Alfonso VII, 1126–1157. Philadelphia: University of Pennsylvania Press.
- Reilly, Bernard F. (2001). "Alfonso VII of Leon-Castilla, the House of Trastámara, and the Emergence of the Kingdom of Portugal". Mediaeval Studies. 63 (1): 193–221. doi:10.1484/J.MS.2.306483.
- Sánchez Belda, Luis, ed. (1950). Chronica Adefonsi Imperatoris. Madrid. pp. 229–30.
