= Gutierre Vermúdez =

Nobleman

Gutierre Vermúdez (or Gutier Bermúdez) (died 1130) was a nobleman of the Kingdom of León, with interests primarily in Galicia, mainly in the northeast, around Lugo. He was a strong and loyal supporter of both Queen Urraca (1109–26) and the Emperor Alfonso VII (1126–57).

Gutierre was a son of Vermudo Ovéquiz, a son of Count Oveco Vermúdez. His mother was Jimena Peláez, daughter of Pelayo Fróilaz and Aldonza Ordóñez. (At that time it was customary for children to have a given name and a patronymic; Ovéquiz is son or daughter of Oveco, Peláez of Pelayo, Pérez of Pedro, etc.) Gutierre was a relative of the Vela family and a brother of Suero Vermúdez. He married Toda Pérez, daughter of Pedro Fróilaz de Traba and Mayor Rodríguez de Bárcena, some time before 18 January 1117. In 1125 she made a donation to the monastery of Carboeiro. After her husband's death, on 1 March 1143 she joined her brother Rodrigo Pérez and her son Vela Gutiérrez in making a donation to Sobrado dos Monxes, which had been founded by her brothers Fernando and Vermudo in 1118. The trio did the same again on 20 March 1155, the last time Toda is recorded alive.

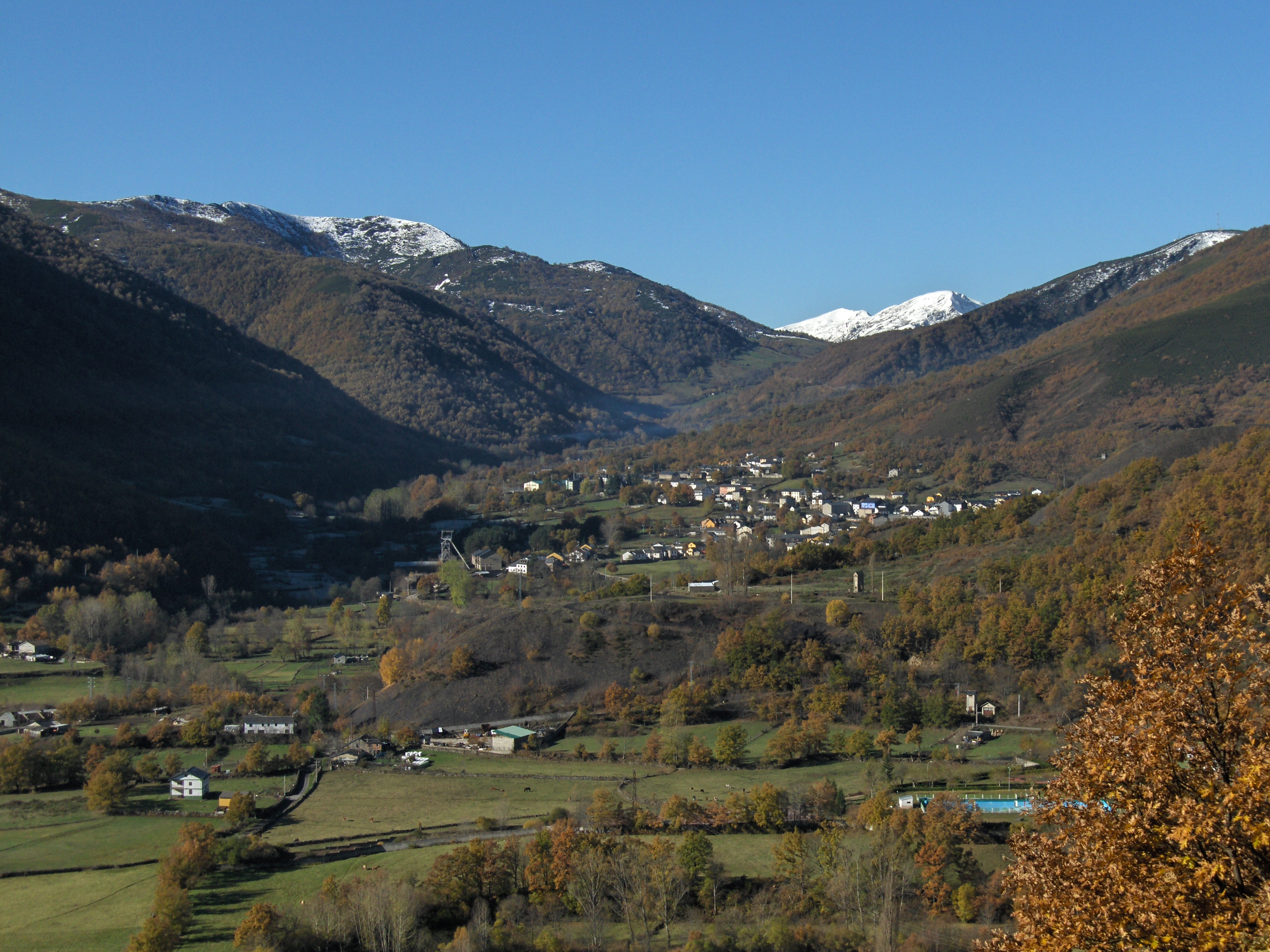
The region (comarca) of Laciana today, which was under the lordship of Gutierre c.1100

Gutierre is first recorded in a document of 18 January 1086. In the time of Alfonso VI, Gutierre got in a dispute with the Benedictine monks of San Juan de Corias over the payment of tolls (portazgo) on the movement of goods through the lordship of Laciana. The king exempted the abbey from tolls in Laciana. In May 1112 Gutierre was raised to the rank of Count (Latin comes) and granted the tenencias (fiefs) of Montenegro (which he retained until at least 1115 and perhaps until the end of Urraca's reign) and Monterroso. In 1117 he and his wife purchased land in Vigo. In 1122 he made endowments to the regular clergy of San Juan de Caabeiro and to San Juan de Corias. In 1126 he made peace with the new king, Alfonso VII, immediately, while he was still in Galicia. He later came to Zamora in April to make the oath of fealty, according to the Chronica Adefonsi imperatoris. Later that spring Arias Pérez led a rebellion in Galicia. According to the Historia compostellana, Alfonso charged a certain "Count G" and the prelate Diego Gelmírez per litteras suas (i.e. in writing) with putting it down. This anonymous count may have been Gutierre or perhaps Gómez Núñez. Sometime between 1127 and 1129 he made a further donation to the Benedictines of Lourenzá, and in 1128 to the military order of the Templars. In February 1129 Gutierre exchanged all his estates in the Asturias with his brother Suero for all of the latter's lands in Galicia.

By a charter dated 30 October 1130, his last known public act, Gutierre made a donation of the monastery of San Salvador de Villafrío to the Cathedral of Saint Mary in Lugo, then under construction under the master builder Raimundo de Monforte. There is a discrepancy, however, between this and a diploma dated to 23 September that same year by which his wife made a donation to Lourenzá for the good of her late husband's soul; one of the documents is dated incorrectly. Toda made a donation to Lourenzá again in May 1131. Gutierre was buried at Lourenzá, although it was located in western Galicia, a zone dominated by the House of Traba. Gutierre's son Vela never attained the same rank as his father; he served as a knight (miles) in the military household of Alfonso VII and was rewarded with the villa of San Esteban de Nogales in May 1149. Vela's son, Ponce Vela de Cabrera, married to Aldonza Alfonso de León, illegitimate daughter of King Alfonso IX, is the ancestor of the Ponce de León.
