= Froila Arias =

Froila Arias (flourished 1056–72) was a Galician count who governed the fortress of Traba and the region of Trastámara during a tumultuous period.

Froila was the son of Arias Tedóniz (flourished 1044–47), related apparently to the family of Rudesind, founder of the monastery of Celanova, with which Froila was connected as early a 1056. Froila was married to Ardio Díaz. As her dowry, she brought him the tenancy of Aranga. They had a daughter, Urraca Fróilaz, who married Count Pedro Fróilaz de Traba. The tenancies of Traba and Trastámara passed to Pedro after Froila's death. Froila may have had another daughter who was the mother of Arias Pérez.

In early 1071, King García II defeated the rebellious count of Portugal, Nuno Mendes and was then defeated in turn and expelled from Galicia by Sancho II of Castile and Alfonso VI of León. Froila appears to have gone quickly to over to the side of Alfonso, confirming his loyalty by confirming a charter of Alfonso issued in Galicia in November 1071. In early 1072, Sancho forced Alfonso into exile and annexed his kingdom, but he was assassinated shortly after. Alfonso returned to León and summoned the nobility of all three realms. Froila was in the city of León during Alfonso's great court of 17–19 November 1072, where the king abolished a toll and reformed judicial procedures. He may have received a competing summons from García, also returning from exile, but he apparently moved rapidly to reassert his loyalty to Alfonso.

Froila Arias may be the "Count Froila" who, according to the Historia Compostellana assassinated his nephew, Bishop Gudesteus of Iria Flavia in 1069. If true, this would make Froila a brother of Bishop Cresconius and another unnamed sibling.

== Sources ==
- Barton, Simon F. (1997). The Aristocracy in Twelfth-century León and Castile. Cambridge: Cambridge University Press.
- Carriedo Tejedo, Manuel (2007). "La familia de San Rosendo". Estudios Mindonienses. 23.
- Crespo del Pozo, José Santiago (1985). Blasones y linajes de Galicia: tomo V (S–Z) (2nd ed.). Publicaciones del Monasterio de San Juan de Poyo.
- Fletcher, Richard A. (1984). Saint James's Catapult: The Life and Times of Diego Gelmírez of Santiago de Compostela. Oxford: Oxford University Press.
- González López, Emilio (1978). Grandeza e decadencia do reino de Galicia. Editorial Galaxia.
- Martínez Díez, Gonzalo (1999). El Cid histórico: un estudio exhaustivo sobre el verdadero Rodrigo Díaz de Vivar. Barcelona: Editorial Planeta.
- Reilly, Bernard F. (1988). The Kingdom of León-Castilla Under King Alfonso VI, 1065–1109. Princeton, NJ: Princeton University Press.
