= Pelayo Menéndez =

Pelayo Menéndez (died 1155/56) was the bishop of Tui (Túy) from 1131 until his death. He was the fourth bishop after the restoration of the diocese (1070), which had fallen into abeyance in the tenth century as a result of Viking and Moorish raids.

Pelayo was a Galician nobleman of middling rank, a great-nephew of Count Pedro Fróilaz de Traba. He introduced the Augustinian rule to the cathedral of Tui in 1138 and was a patron of monasteries. He had a hand in the founding of the monastery of San Martín de Loureza before 1139, when he granted the church and some tithes to Abbot Pedro Initiense. He may also have helped start the monastery at nearby Oia, but the large number of forged documents make disentangling this monastery's early history difficult. In 1148 he donated his part of the church at Franza to the monastery of Xuvia, partially as payment for some livestock. With the help of his brother Suero, he tried to restore the monastery of Barrantes in 1151. On 31 August 1152, Pelayo was at the royal court, where he employed a royal scribe to write up a donation of land at Pesegueiro to two brothers, Pedro and Lucio, who promised in return to render annually two solidi to the canons of Tui. There is evidence that Pelayo provided military service to the king, but there is little evidence from this time about what episcopal military service compassed.

== Sources ==
- Barton, Simon (1997). The Aristocracy in Twelfth-century León and Castile. Cambridge: Cambridge University Press.
- Fernández Rodríguez, Manuel (2004). Toronium: Aproximación a la Historia de una Tierra Medieval: Galicia y Portugal en la Edad Media. Madrid: Consejo Superior de Investigaciones Científicas. ISBN 84-00082613.,
- Fletcher, Richard (1978). The Episcopate in the Kingdom of León in the Twelfth Century. Oxford: Oxford University Press.
