= Pedro Fróilaz de Traba =

11/12th-century Galician military, political, and religious figure

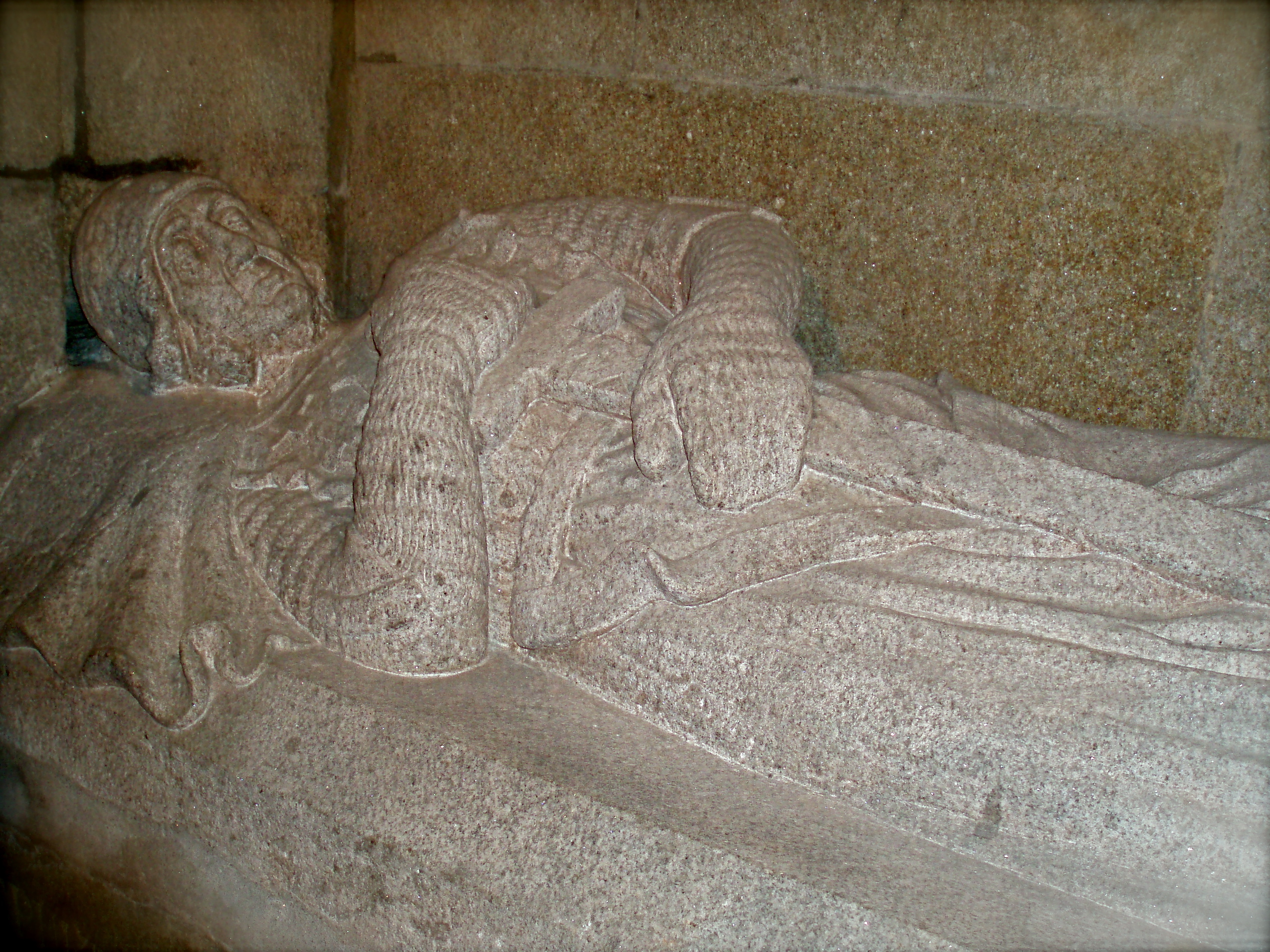
Pedro's tomb effigy in the Capela das Reliquias of the cathedral of Compostela

Pedro Fróilaz de Traba (fl. 1086–1126) was the most powerful secular magnate in the Kingdom of Galicia during the first quarter of the twelfth century. According to the Historia compostelana, he was "spirited ... warlike ... of great power ... a man who feared God and hated iniquity," for Diego Gelmírez himself had "fed him, like a spiritual son, with the nutriment of holy teaching." Brought up at the court of the Emperor Alfonso VI, Pedro raised the future Emperor Alfonso VII in his household. Around the latter he and Diego formed a "Galician party" that dominated that region during the turbulent reign of Urraca (1109–26). In September 1111 they even had the child Alfonso crowned king at Santiago de Compostela, but it was Pedro who was imperator in orbe Galletiae ("emperor in the ambit of Galicia").

Widely travelled and well-connected, especially through the prestigious marriages of his many daughters—he had at least sixteen legitimate children by his two wives—Pedro was, besides a political and military figure, a religious one. Sometime before 1109 he founded the first religious house for women in Galicia. As a result of his generosity to the Cathedral of Saint James in Compostela, Pedro is the best known Spanish nobleman of his era. One modern historian has written that he "needs a modern biography, and the materials are adequate for one." Most existing coverage is outdated or too heavily reliant on the Historia compostelana.

== Family ==
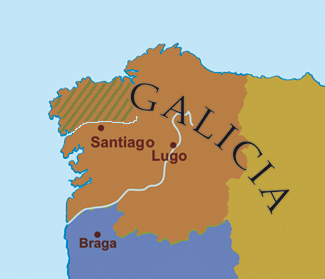
The territory ruled by Pedro Fróilaz directly was the Trastámara, that is, the land beyond the river Tambre, just north of Santiago (hatched).

Pedro was the son of Froila Vermúdez de Traba and his wife, Elvira de Faro. The first reference to Pedro is from 9 November 1086, when he subscribed to his father's donation to the monastery of San Martín de Jubia, now Couto. According to the Historia compostelana, Pedro was raised from childhood at the court of Alfonso VI of León. His first wife was Urraca Fróilaz, daughter of Froila Arias and Ardio Díaz. They were married sometime before 12 August 1088, although a document surviving only in an eighteenth-century copy records their marriage on 11 August 1102. By 6 May 1105 Pedro had remarried to Mayor (Guntroda) Rodríguez (de Bárcena), daughter of Rodrigo Muñoz. Mayor was a major benefactress of Lugo Cathedral (14 June 1112) and the monasteries of Jubia (26 December 1114) and Sahagún (26 March 1125). She is last recorded alive on 6 January 1129 and probably died not long afterwards.

By his first wife Pedro had three sons and two daughters. The eldest son, Bermudo, would eventually be overshadowed, politically, by the second, Fernando. His other son was Froila and his daughters Jimena and Lupa (married Munio Peláez). By his second wife Pedro had six daughters—Elvira (married Gómez Núñez), Estefanía, Ilduara (married Arias Pérez and, as her second husband, the Portuguese nobleman Afonso Egas), Sancha, Toda (married Gutierre Vermúdez), and Urraca—and five sons—Rodrigo, García, Martín, Sancho, and Velasco. The assignment of any one of Pedro's children to one of his two wives is in many cases uncertain. The record of the cartulary of the monastery of Sobrado lists only five sons and a daughter without naming a mother, for instance.

There may have been a second daughter named Toda who married Gutierre Osorio, from the province of León, as well as a daughter named Eva, wife of García Garcés de Aza. The historian Enrique Flórez named Gómez Núñez as another son-in-law by at the latest 1117. Pedro's son García may have married Elvira, illegitimate daughter of Queen Urraca and her lover Pedro González de Lara. This marriage would have taken place, if at all, between 1120 and 1126, and would have been designed to reconcile the Galician faction and the court faction.

== Political career ==
=== Follower of Raymond of Galicia (1090–1107) ===
In January 1090 Pedro was governing Ferreira in Galicia and is described in a royal charter as dominator Ferrarie (lord of Ferreira, today part of Coristanco). The only contemporary reference to Pedro which names him in the way by which he is now generally known is an undated fragment of a charter of Alfonso VI, which calls him Petro Froillaz de Traua. It was the thirteenth-century historian Rodrigo Jiménez de Rada some hundred years later who initiated the historiographic tradition, still followed today, which names Pedro and his descendants "de Traba". His wording—Comes Petrus de Trava in Gallecia—may be derived from the corresponding passage in the Historio compostelana, where Pedro is named Petrus Froylaz Comes de Trava.

By 11 January 1096 Pedro had received the title of "count" (comes in Latin), the highest title bestowed in the kingdoms of León and Castile. In that year he appealed to the king to intervene to settle a dispute he had with the Abbey of Samos, which the king did. By March 1098 he was governing Traba, from which his family was to derive its recurring toponym. In royal charters he is sometimes called comes de Ferraria (count of Ferreira) and sometimes comes de Traba (count of Traba). Pedro was a supporter and vassal of Raymond of Galicia and his wife, Urraca, whom he probably knew from his time in the household of her father, Alfonso VI. Shortly after his birth in 1105, Raymond and Urraca's son, Alfonso Raimúndez, was placed in the care of Count Pedro. It was not uncommon for the scions of noble houses to be raised in others, commonly in those of higher standing.

=== Formation of a "Raimundist party" (1107–1109) ===
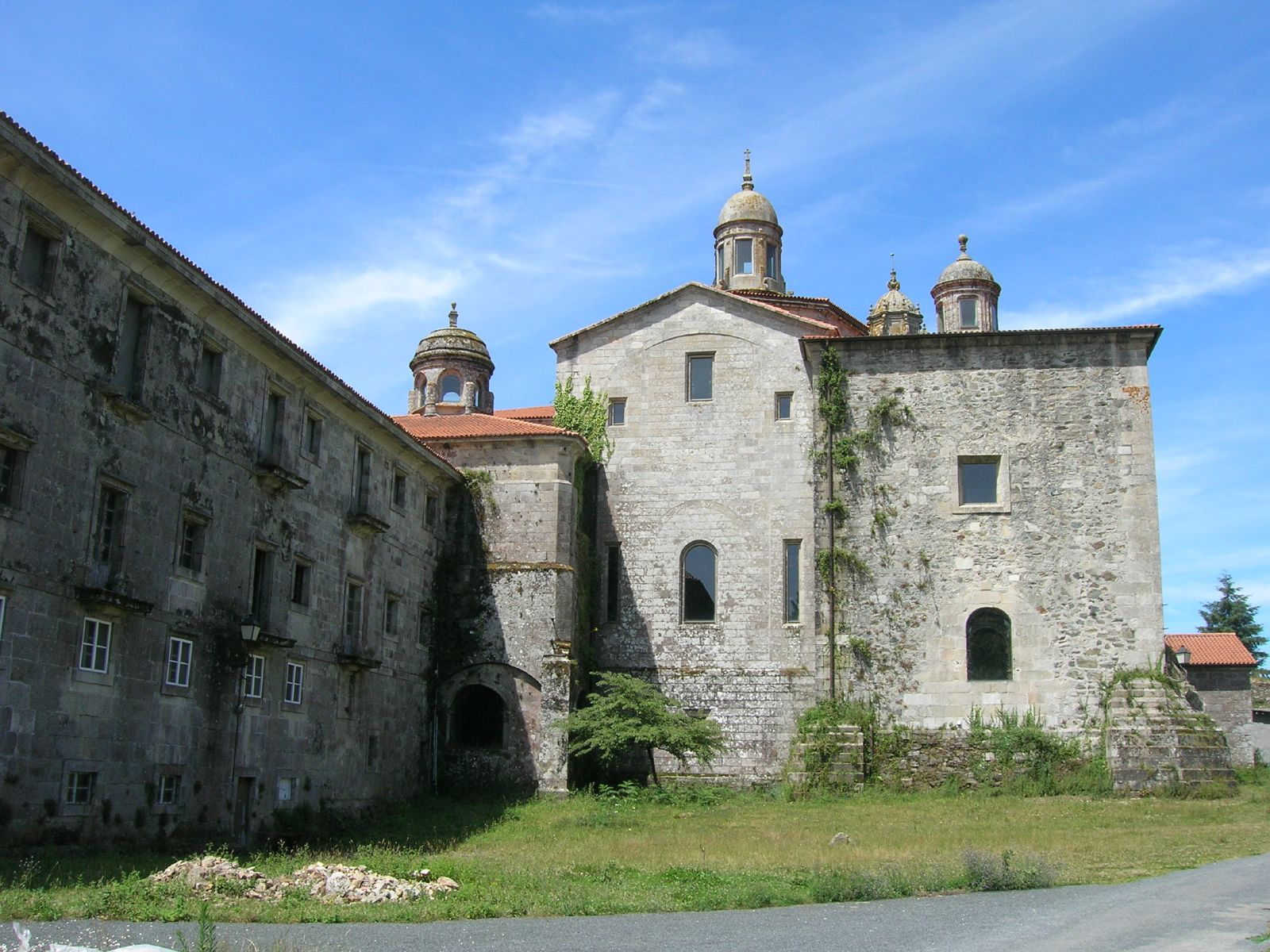
The monastery of Sobrado was granted to Pedro's eldest two sons in 1118, although already in 1109 Pedro's territory had been defined by it.

After the death of Raymond, his widow Urraca donated a Galician monastery to the Archdiocese of Santiago de Compostela, signing the charter, dated 13 December 1107, as imperatoris filia et totius gallecie domina. The important Galician bishops of Lugo, Mondoñedo, Tui, and Ourense, along with Pedro Fróilaz and the Asturian magnate Suero Vermúdez were present to confirm the donation, which was probably designed to secure the support of Diego Gelmírez for Urraca's rule in Galicia. In 1107 Pedro also confirmed a royal donation to the monastery of Caabeiro, signing as "Count Pedro of Galicia", with his two eldest sons beside him, although the comital title (count) and the territorial designation (Galicia) were not directly connected. It is not clear whether he was named as Raymond's successor in Galicia by Alfonso VI. The authors of the Historia compostelana certainly did not recognise it, but perhaps for partisan reasons. Beginning in 1109, however, Pedro's power and influence in Galicia was such that he was calling himself "Count of Galicia" (Gallecie comes), although he did not control the entire province. This had occurred by 22 July, shortly after the death of Alfonso VI and the succession of Urraca, who was his heiress after the death of Sancho Alfónsez at the Battle of Uclés (1108). He continued using this title until 1122. A judicial document, and thus one not having royal approval in its particulars, dated 1 November 1109 refers to "duke Don Pedro Fróilaz who [is] ruling the nearby territory of Sobrado". A royal charter dated 23 May 1121 and calling Pedro a count in maritimis ("in the maritime province") is probably an accurate description of the realm of his public authority: the Atlantic coastlands of Galicia, specifically those north of the river Tambre and encompassing A Coruña. It is a sign of his fame that he was referred to as Petro Galliciensi comite ("Pedro, Galician count") in a letter from William IX, Duke of Aquitaine, to Diego Gelmírez on the occasion of his pilgrimage to Santiago.

=== War with Alfonso the Battler (1110–1112) ===
“Galicia, behind its mountain shield, had become almost a third power rather than a province, ruled in uneasy alliance by the bishop of Compostela and Count Pedro Fróilaz. [The queen's] son, Alfonso Raimúndez, was the ward of those two and the ultimate basis of their practical ability to govern there in near independence of her.”

When, in the autumn of 1109, Urraca married Alfonso the Battler, the King of Aragon and Navarre, Pedro opposed the marriage, which might have interfered with the succession of Urraca's son by Raymond. Within months of the wedding Pedro had rebelled in Galicia against Urraca's authority. Early in May 1110 Alfonso the Battler entered Galicia with an army. At some point before early July he ravaged the lands of Pedro Fróilaz, but without much effect. Late that summer, a faction of Galicians, led by Pedro with the young Alfonso in tow, visited Urraca at Castrojeriz and there became convinced that she was making peace with her estranged husband. This prompted Pedro to seek the advice of Henry, Count of Portugal, a relative of Raymond of Galicia and the most powerful man in the west of the kingdom. On Henry's advice Pedro arrested the partisans of the queen who had journeyed with him and returned to Galicia, where he opened negotiations with the queen. In exchange for the freedom of her supporters she surrendered the castle of Santa María de Castrelo on the Galician border with Portugal. This acquisition secured communication with Henry for the future.

In the fall of 1110 Pedro placed his wife, Mayor Rodríguez, and his ward, Alfonso, in his newly acquired castle. One of the queen's supporters, a minor nobleman named Arias Pérez, attacked suddenly and forced Pedro to retreat, leaving his wife and charge besieged in the castle. Pedro pleaded with Diego Gelmírez to negotiate terms, but no sooner had he done so and the siege had been lifted than Urraca imprisoned Pedro, Diego, Alfonso, and Mayor. The bishop was soon released so that negotiations could begin with Count Pedro directly. He was released probably in January 1111.

On 19 September 1111, Diego and Pedro had the young Alfonso crowned king in Santiago de Compostela. According to the Historia compostelana, Pedro acted as steward (dapifer) at the coronation festivities. After the coronation, Pedro and Diego gathered an army to subject Galicia to his rule, first attacking Lugo, which was still loyal to Alfonso the Battler. They captured it and probably left a detachment there before crossing the mountains in the direction of the capital, León. They were ambushed about twenty miles from the city by Alfonso and defeated in the Battle of Viadangos, whereat Pedro was captured. Diego escaped with the young Alfonso Raimúndez and brought the boy to Urraca in Galicia, marking the first time the queen had physical custody of her son since she began ruling in 1109.

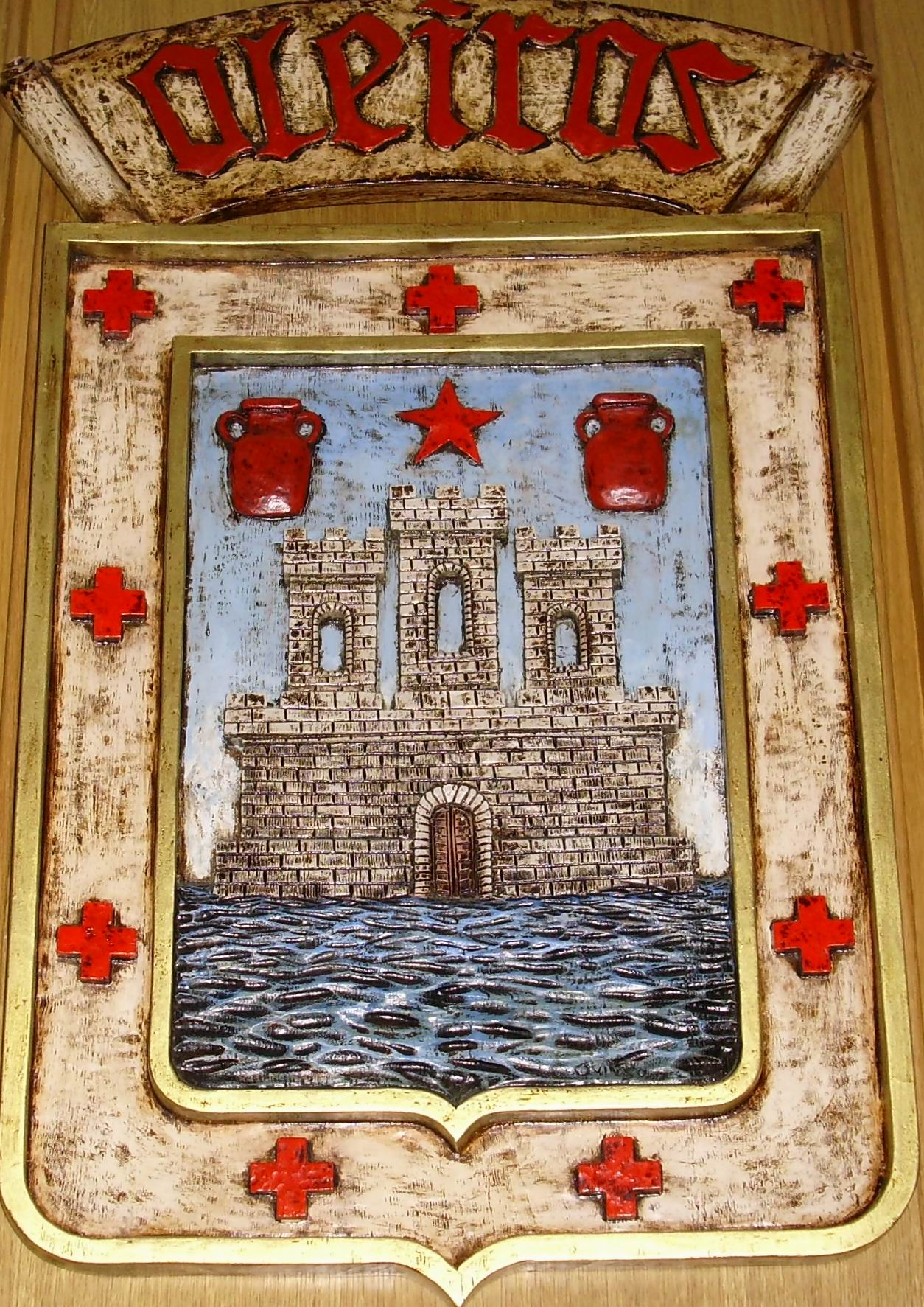
Coat-of-arms of Oleiros, showing a castle on the sea. The castle at Oleiros was probably originally built as protection against Vikings and it was granted to Pedro Fróilaz in 1112.

By May 1112 Pedro had been released, possibly in order to cause division among the Galicians, who had gone over to Urraca after Viadangos. Urraca was soon forced to recognise Alfonso as her heir and co-ruler, although he was then too young to possess any real power, making the effect of such a concession the increase in power of Pedro and Diego. At about this time, the young Alfonso was put once again in the physical custody of Diego and Pedro in return for their support against Alfonso the Battler. In May 1112, a royal castle at Leyro (perhaps Oleiros) in the north of Nendos was granted to Pedro. For the duration of the year 1112, however, no divisions appear among the followers of Urraca, united in their opposition to Alfonso the Battler.

=== Guardian of Alfonso Raimúndez (1112–1122) ===
Between 1112 and 1122 Pedro served Alfonso Raimúndez in various capacities as a tutor. In the earliest instance, May 1112, he is described by Alfonso's mother, Queen Urraca, as he "who raised and nourished my son the lord king Alfonso", a fact justified by his being raised at the court of her father, the previous lord king Alfonso. On 5 July 1118, in a document from Celanova, Alfonso is called a clientulus ("little dependent") of Pedro. As late as 22 March 1122 Alfonso was still referring to Pedro as regis altor (royal protector). It was around this time, in 1121 or 1122, that Pedro made a final peace with his old enemy, Arias Pérez, by marrying to him his own daughter Ildaria. By 1121 Pedro's second son, Fernando, was already a count, because of his influence at the court of Theresa, Countess of Portugal. On 25 July 1122, Pedro's eldest son, Vermudo, made over the bridewealth to his wife Urraca Enríquez, daughter of Theresa of Portugal. This marriage was contracted through Fernando and the bridewealth was given to Vermudo by his father for that express purpose. At some point early in the century Pedro gave a Moorish cook named Martín to Fernando. This has been taken to indicate Pedro's "taste for Moorish cooking".

In July 1114 Urraca ventured into Galicia with the intention of depriving Diego of his secular powers. In this she was joined by Pedro Fróilaz, Munio Peláez, Suero Vermúdez, Guter Vermúdez, and Rodrigo Vélaz, but not by her son. A contemporary charter records that "the queen Doña Urraca reigning with her son Don Alfonso in the kingdom of Spain [and] discord also remaining between them." The conspiracy against Diego is mentioned in a royal charter of 23 July, in the Historia compostelana, and in a private document of the Cathedral of León (26 July). Diego and Pedro were not always on good terms, with the Historia compostelana accusing of Pedro of depredating the Galician church and at times even robbing the poor. In July 1114, however, Pedro changed his mind and supported Diego. After Diego successfully defended himself from Urraca's charges, the queen left Compostela for Salnes, planning to kidnap Diego at Iria Flavia. The archbishop was warned in a secret message from Pedro and evaded the queen's men. Negotiations were then opened and the queen, Pedro, Muño, and Rodrigo all swore oaths to respect the rights of the archdiocese to its tenancies.

=== Pedro and Alfonso against Diego and Urraca (1116–1118) ===
In March or April 1116 Pedro was fighting along with Alfonso Raimúndez in the region around Toledo on behalf of Urraca. Through this he learned of a plot by the queen to have the archbishop seized and for a second time duly forewarned him. Pedro and Alfonso promptly returned to Galicia and raised the standard of revolt. Urraca marched via Triacastela and Mellid, the route usually taken by pilgrims to Compostela, into Galicia, gaining many supporters on the way. Surprisingly, the citizens of Compostela were prepared to fight for her against their lord, Diego, and his allies. The rebels were forced to abandon the capital of Galicia to Urraca, who hastily arranged a new alliance with Diego.

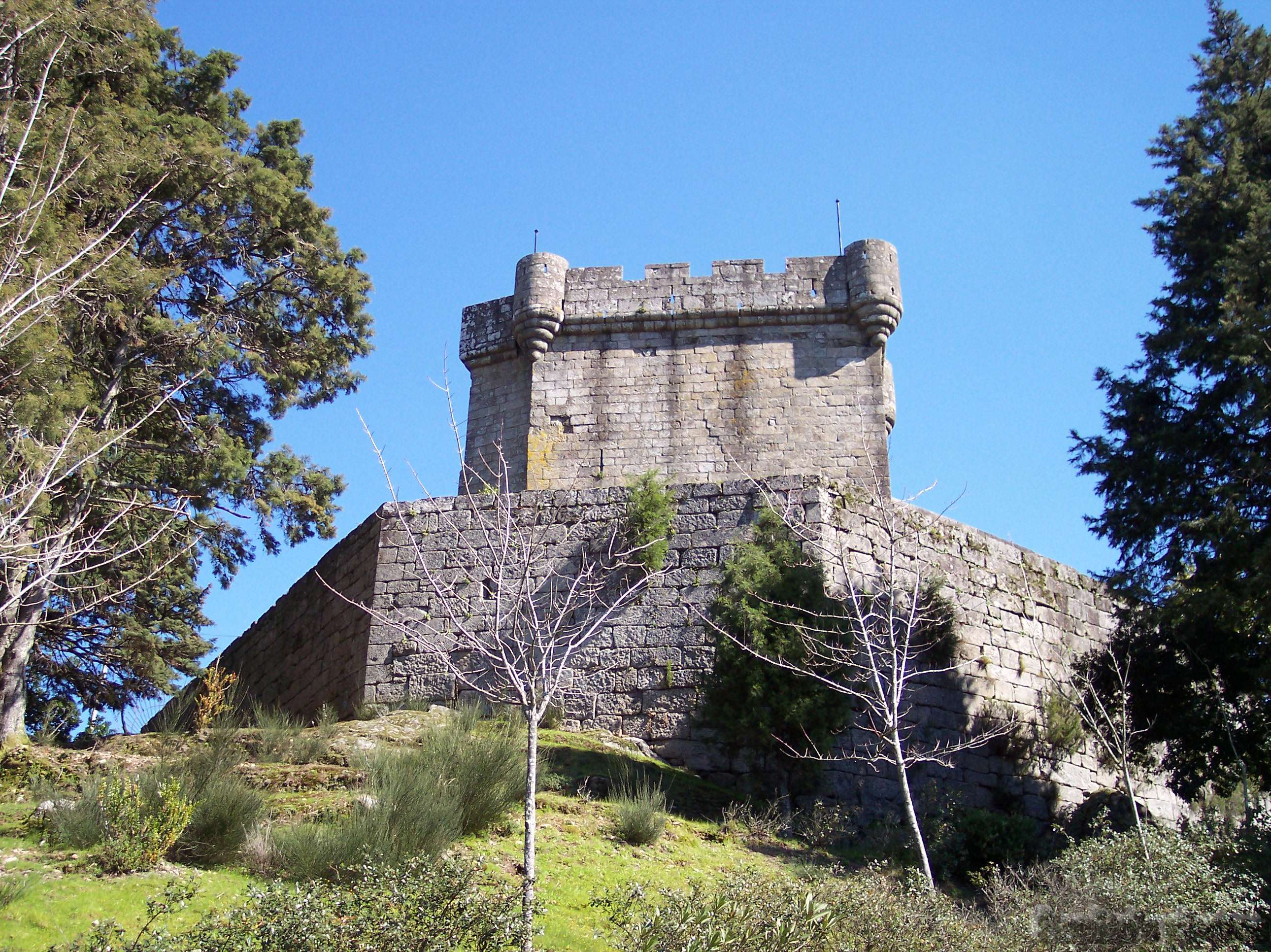
Castle of Sobroso, where Pedro surprised and besieged Queen Urraca.

On 18 May 1116 Urraca granted Diego a charter that was subscribed by Pedro, indicating that at least initially he too was drawn into the alliance with the queen. But when Urraca campaigned against Gómez Núñez, whose lands guarded the roads into Portugal from Galicia, she was surprised and besieged in Sobroso by Pedro in alliance with the Countess Theresa. The queen was forced to retreat to Compostela and thence to León. Pedro's breach with Urraca mirrored a temporary change in his relations with Diego. Not perfectly respecting his oath to the archbishop, in 1116 Pedro was chased by Diego from the territories of his archiepiscopal lordship into the mountains around Deza. The Historia also records that he led raids to scoff serfs and cattle.

In the autumn of 1116 Urraca held court at Sahagún and there opened negotiations with the party of her son Alfonso, led by Diego and Pedro. The only secure date for these negotiations comes from a charter of 15 October, which the queen issued from Sahagún. Urraca was able to draw her son Alfonso at least temporarily out of the orbit of Pedro Fróilaz and Diego Gelmírez by granting him the Kingdom of Toledo as an appanage. By November, when Alfonso was twelve years old, he had entered Toledo to rule it. The Historia compostelana also claims that Urraca conceded to her son, and by implication to his guardians, the rule of Galicia, although there is no documentary evidence of this. It seems especially unlikely in light of the apparent weakness of Diego and Pedro's alliance at the time, and the lack of support for them in Santiago de Compostela itself.

In the spring of 1117, probably in June, Urraca, after campaigning against Theresa in southern Galicia, came to Santiago to mediate between Diego and the council (concejo), which had been ruling the town de facto for the past year. During a private meeting between Urraca and Diego in the episcopal palace, the townspeople revolted and forced the two to take refuge in a cathedral tower then under construction, which they promptly lit on fire. When the queen came out she was seized by the mob, stripped, and pelted with stones before certain moderates rescued her. Extracting from her promises of amnesty, they freed her to leave the city. She and Diego—who had managed to escape unscathed—then joined the army that had assembled under Pedro Fróilaz and Alfonso. On seeing the approach of Pedro's forces the town surrendered. Its leaders were exiled and their properties confiscated. The town was assessed an indemnity and the rule of the archbishop was restored.

=== Final war with Urraca (1120–1123) ===
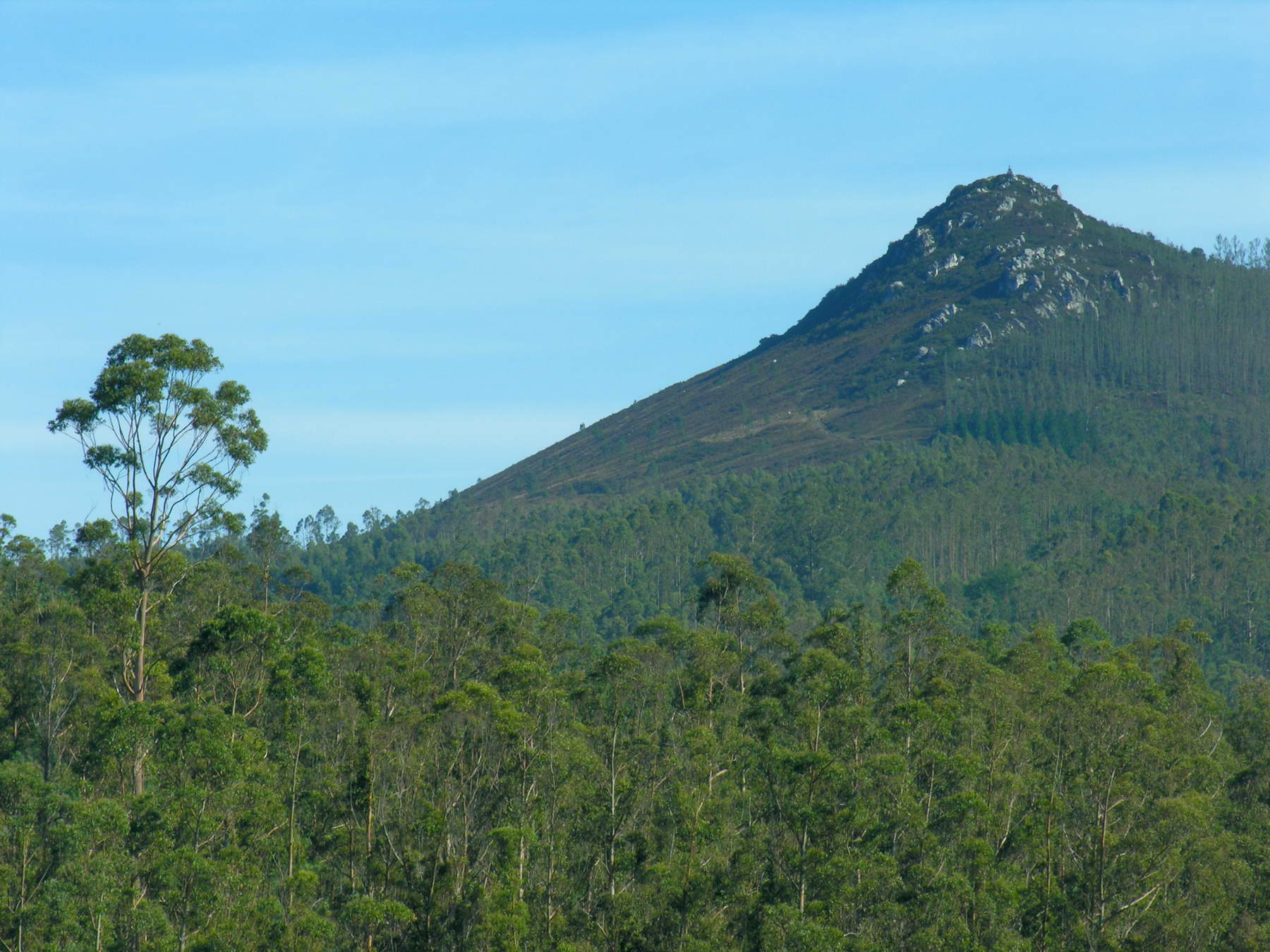
Pico Sacro ("sacred peak"), where Urraca camped her army to threaten Santiago

In the years 1118–19, Pedro Fróilaz is revealed in the surviving documents of the period to have been the most important lay supporter of the royal prerogative and the imperial pretensions of Alfonso Raimúndez. In the spring of 1120 Urraca returned to Galicia and formed a tenuous military alliance with Diego against certain supporters of Pedro Fróilaz. The local campaigning was a success. During the subsequent campaign against Theresa of Portugal, however, Urraca had imprisoned Diego and attempted to assert her authority in his lordship directly. At that juncture her son left her camp and joined that of Pedro in the vicinity of Santiago. This incited some citizens to riot in support of Diego, and Urraca was forced to release him on 28 July 1120, although she would not restore his secular authority. The archbishop then enlisted the aid of Pedro, Alfonso, and Theresa. In the fall the queen was forced to concede the fiscal lands around Sahagún to her son's direct rule.

In 1121 Urraca confiscated the secular lordship of the archbishop of Santiago, including his fortresses and castles. This led to a dispute with the papacy, and Pope Calixtus II sent letters to the queen threatening excommunication. Negotiations between the monarch and the bishop were reopened, but they were soon broken off and Urraca gathered an army and invaded Galicia. She marched to the castle of Cira, thence to Tabeiros and Salnes, and finally camped at the mount of Picosacro, close by Santiago de Compostela. Archbishop Diego and Count Pedro raised an army and fought a few skirmishes, but the prelate soon arranged a peace. A royal document of 23 May records Urraca in obsidione super Acromonte ("in siege above Acromonte"), probably a reference to Picosacro. It indicates that, contrary to the testimony of the Historia compostelana, Alfonso Raimúndez was then with his mother's forces, not those of Pedro Fróilaz. Diego was able ultimately to force the return of his church's lands, and probably Pedro received an equally favourable settlement from the queen. He was with the queen on 22 March 1122, when she confirmed Alfonso's donation of the monastery of San Martín de Pinario to the church of Compostela, and was with her again on 8 March 1123 at Lugo, with most of the Galician high nobility. Sometime after this, and perhaps before she came to an understanding with Diego on 27 March, Queen Urraca had Pedro arrested and imprisoned along with his sons. Her exact motive is unclear, although his fiefs were confiscated. Pedro remained a royal prisoner at least until Urraca's death, and his sons continued to support her enemy, Theresa of Portugal. The Chronicon iriense, a history of the diocese of Santiago de Compostela, may have been written between the years 1121, when Pedro and the Galician magnates were forced to swear oaths to Bishop Diego, and 1123, when Pedro and his sons were imprisoned by the queen. On this account, the Chronicon was designed to bolster Diego's claims by a recourse to the history.

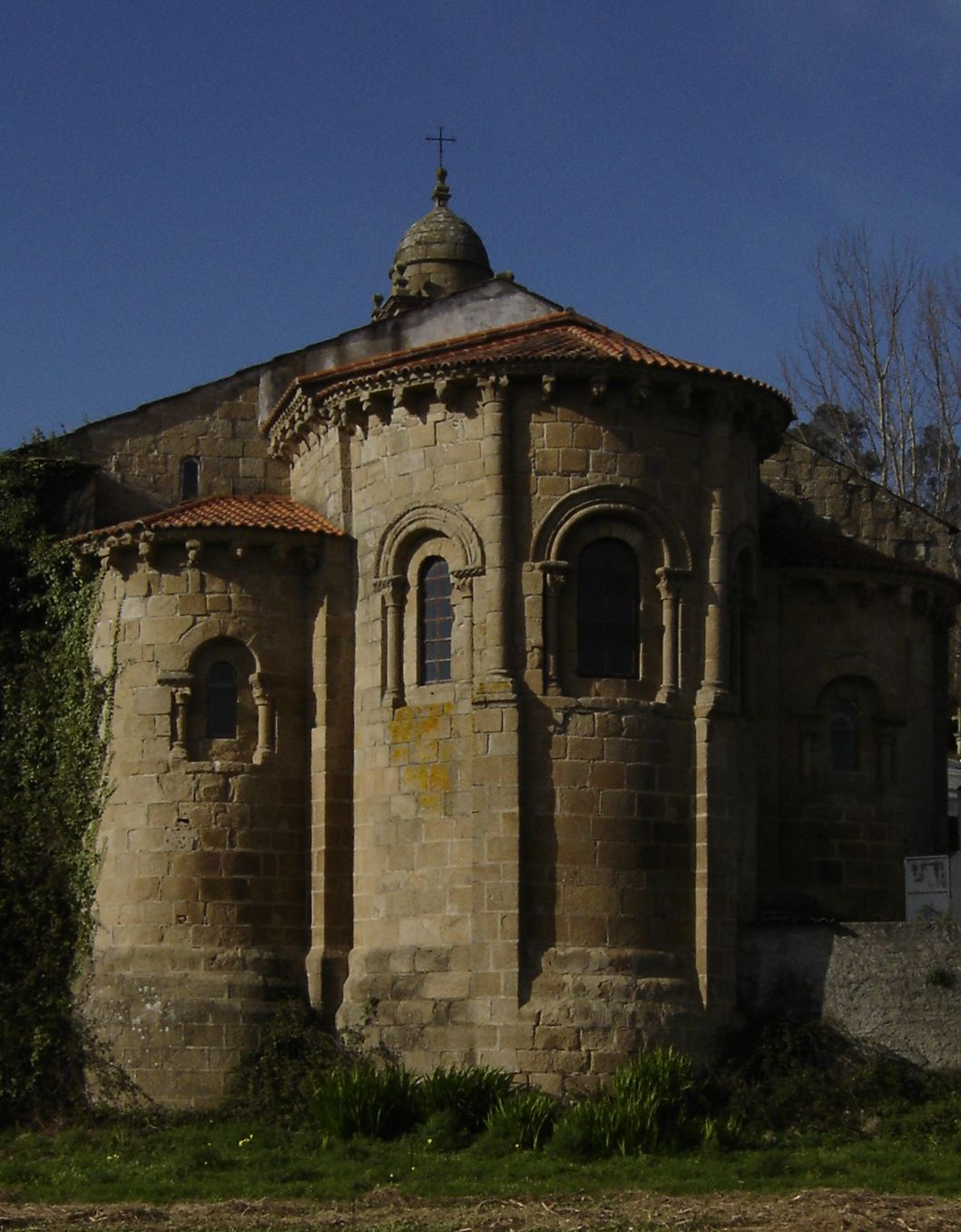
Apse of the monastery of Jubia, a major beneficiary of Pedro's religious patronage and which he eventually gave to Cluny.

== Religious patronage ==
Pedro was a major patron of Benedictine monasticism and of the Cluniac reform. He made donations to Jubia, Nemeño, and Pedroso. On 14 December 1113 Pedro and his siblings granted Jubia to the Abbey of Cluny. There are also three suspicious donations recorded to the regular clergy of Caabeiro. Sometime in the early 1120s, persuaded by Diego Gelmírez, Pedro granted the church a Cospindo near Traba to the archdiocese of Santiago de Compostela. His other benefactions to the see were so numerous that the author of the Historia compostelana refused to list them all. The motive behind this generosity was Pedro and his second wife's desire to be buried in the Cathedral of Santiago de Compostela. Pedro is also known to have made donations to the diocese of Mondoñedo, to the immediate east of his domains.

The Historia compostelana records that there were no nunneries in Galicia around the year 1100. This was rectified by Pedro Fróilaz sometime before 1108. The monastery of Cines (Cinis), long abandoned, he had recently resurrected as a community of nuns. Early in 1108, with papal and episcopal support, a certain Abbot Nuño (Munio), with a community of monks, expelled the ladies and re-established a monastery there. Pedro in turn removed the men and in their place re-installed the women. These may have included two of his three known sisters. Visclavara, who never married and was a prolific religious donor—to Jubia, Cines, Carboeiro, and the cathedral of Santiago—was still in secular life in 1097, but was described as a "handmaid of the handmaids of God" (ancillarum Dei ancilla) in 1114. The other sister, Munia, is consistently called "vowed to God" (Deo vota) in the sources. She lived until 1145 and was also a donor to Jubia.

The removal of the monks of Cines provoked a controversy which was eventually brought before Pope Paschal II. Initially he was persuaded by the expelled monks and sent a letter dated 1 May 1109 to the bishops of Compostela, Mondoñedo, and Lugo ordering them to protest Count Pedro's actions. A second letter was sent to Bernard de Sedirac, the apostolic legate, at the same time. Pedro responded by making a pilgrimate to Rome with the archives of the monastery of Cines to plead his case before the curia Romana. There he persuaded Paschal that the monastery was a family possession. Paschal sent a new letter to Bernard and Diego, dated 11 April 1110, ordering them to re-establish the women at Cines.

== Death ==
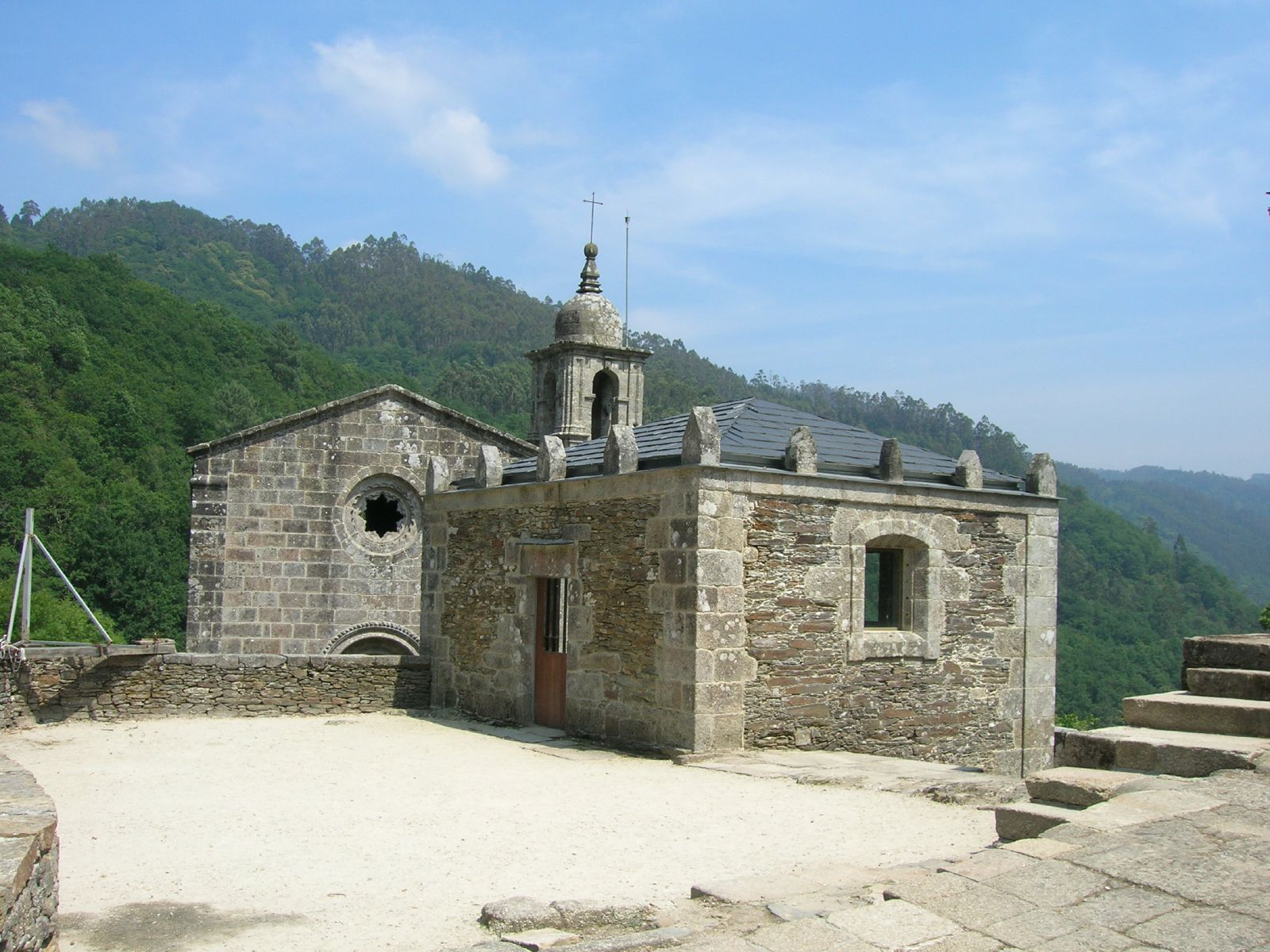
Pedro's relationship to the monastery of Caabeiro is perhaps somewhat falsified in the surviving documents, but a document from here is one of the last records of Pedro (1125) and the only one that names his countship as Trastámara, that is, the lands beyond (tras) the Tambre (Támara).

Pedro is not recorded in any royal document after his imprisonment in 1123. His wife does name him as co-donor of the Tresancos and Némitos to Jubia on 27 February 1125. A document of Caabeiro, dated 1125, refers to Pedro as count in Trastámara, a title his descendants would frequently bear. Pedro is last recorded in a document dated 25 March 1126. On 3 May his widow made a donation to the monastery of Sahagún for the sake of his soul, possibly indicating that he had died in the interim. The Historia compostelana records that Pedro made a division of his properties amongst his heirs on his deathbed, with the consent of his wife and children, although no written record of this division has survived. Several modern sources date Pedro's death to 1128, but few give reasons. The deathbed munificence of Pedro in favour of the see of Compostela, which is recorded in the Historia compostelana, has been dated to 1128.

The historian Richard A. Fletcher has noted how well-travelled and well-connected Pedro was for a nobleman of his time: "His upbringing at the peripatetic court of Alfonso VI must have familiarized him with most corners of the kingdom of León-Castile; he had spent some time in captivity in Aragon; [and] he numbered among his acquaintances the princes of southern France." He was buried in the cathedral of Compostela, where his tomb, surmounted by an effigy carved in stone, still lies in the "Chapel of Relics". In the central plaza of Compostela, he had once had an iron statue of himself put up, which does not survive.

== Bibliography ==
- R. ALONSO ÁLVAREZ. "Los promotores de la orden del Císter en los reinos de Castilla y León: Familias aristocráticas y damas nobles." Anuario de estudios medievales, 37 (2007), 653–710.
- S. BARTON. The Aristocracy in Twelfth-century León and Castile. Cambridge: Cambridge University Press, 1997.
- S. BARTON. "From Tyrants to Soldiers of Christ: The Nobility of Twelfth-century León-Castile and the Struggle Against Islam." Nottingham Medieval Studies, 44 (2000), 28–48.
- A. G. BIGGS. Diego Gelmírez, First Archbishop of Compostela. Washington, D.C.: 1949.
- C. J. BISHKO. "Fernando I and the Origins of the Leonese–Castilian Alliance With Cluny." Studies in Medieval Spanish Frontier History. London: Variorum, 1980. Originally published in Cuadernos de Historia de España, 47 (1968), 31–135, and 48 (1969), 30–116.
- C. J. BISHKO. "Count Henrique of Portugal, Cluny, and the Antecedents of the Pacto Sucessório." Spanish and Portuguese Monastic History, 600–1300. London: Variorum, 1983. Originally published in Revista Portuguesa de História, 13 (1971), 155–90.
- J. M. CANAL SÁNCHEZ-PAGÍN. "Don Pedro Fernández, primer maestre de la Orden Militar de Santiago: Su familia, su vida." Anuario de estudios medievales, 14 (1984), 33–71.
- J. M. CANAL SÁNCHEZ-PAGÍN. "Casamientos de los condes de Urgel en Castilla." Anuario de estudios medievales, 19 (1989), 119–35.
- J. M. CANAL SÁNCHEZ-PAGÍN. "Jimena Muñoz, amiga de Alfonso VI." Anuario de estudios medievales, 21 (1991), 11–40.
- R. A. FLETCHER. Saint James's Catapult: The Life and Times of Diego Gelmírez of Santiago de Compostela. Oxford: Oxford University Press, 1984.
- A. X. GARRIGÓS. "La actuación del Arzobispo Gelmírez a través de los documentos de la Historia Compostelana." Hispania, 3:12 (1943), 355–408.
- A. ISLA FREZ. "Ensayo de historiografía medieval: El Cronicón Iriense." En la España medieval, 5 (1984), 413–31.
- A. LÓPEZ FERREIRO. Don Alfonso VII, Rey de Galicia, y su ayo el Conde de Traba. Santiago de Compostela: 1885.
- J. L. LÓPEZ SANGIL. La nobleza altomedieval gallega: La familia Froilaz–Traba. A Coruña: 2002. Originally published in Estudios Mindonienses, 12 (1996), 275–403.
- J. L. LÓPEZ SANGIL. "La fundación del monasterio de san Salvador de Cines." Asociación de Estudios Históricos de Galicia.
- L. MONTEAGUDO GARCÍA. "Carta de Coruña romana." Emerita, 20 (1952), 466–90.
- M. C. PALLARÉS MÉNDEZ and E. PORTELA SILVA. "Aristocracia y sistema de parentesco en la Galicia de los siglos centrales de la Edad Media: El grupo de los Traba." Hispania, 53:185 (1993), 823–40.
- E. PASCUA. "South of the Pyrenees: Kings, Magnates and Political Bargaining in Twelfth-century Spain." Journal of Medieval History, 27 (2001), 101–20.
- R. PASTOR DE TOGNERI. "Diego Gelmírez, une mentalité à la page: A propos du rôle de certaines élites de pouvoir." Mélanges offerts à René Crozet, 1 (1966), 597–608.
- A. PENA GRAÑA. Narón, un Concello con Historia de Seu, II (1992), 54–192.
- E. PORTELA SILVA. "La explicación sociopolítica del éxito cirterciense en Galicia." En la España medieval, 3 (1982), 319–30.
- B. F. REILLY. "Santiago and Saint Denis: The French Presence in Eleventh-century Spain." Catholic Historical Review, 54:3 (1968), 467–83.
- B. F. REILLY. The Kingdom of León-Castilla under Queen Urraca, 1109–1126. Princeton: Princeton University Press, 1982.
- B. F. REILLY. The Kingdom of León-Castilla under King Alfonso VI, 1065–1109. Princeton: Princeton University Press, 1989.
- E. S. SÁNCHEZ. "El monasterio de Santa María de Ribeira." Hispania, 4:15 (1944), 163–210.
- L. SÁNCHEZ BELDA. "Pedro Fróilaz, Conde de Traba." Diccionario de Historia de España. Madrid: 1979.
- M. C. TORRES SEVILLA-QUIÑONES DE LEÓN. "Relaciones fronterizas entre Portugal y León en tiempos de Alfonso VII: El ejemplo de la casa de Traba." Revista da Faculdade de Letras: Historia, 15:1 (1998), 301–12.
- T. M. VANN. "Fróilaz, Pedro, Count of Trava." Medieval Iberia: An Encyclopedia. E. Michael Gerli and Samuel G. Armistead, edd. Taylor & Francis, 2003, 341.
