= Ancilla =

Ancilla may refer to:

- Maid (Latin: ancilla); see also Ancillae
- Ancilla College, US
- Ancilla bit, a bit used in quantum computing
- Ancilla (gastropod), a genus of olive snails
- Ancilla van de Leest, a Dutch model, politician, and activist

== See also ==
- Ancilla Dei, a title given to a deceased woman in early Christian inscriptions
