= Arias Pérez =

Galician knight

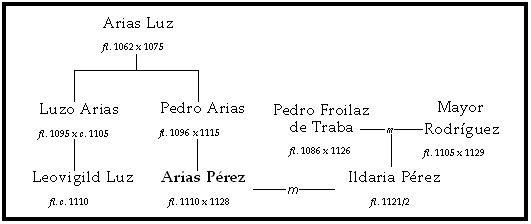
Arias's proposed family tree.

Arias Pérez or Peres (fl. 1110–1129) was a Galician knight and military leader in the Kingdom of León. According to modern scholar Richard Fletcher, he was "active, resourceful, spirited and persuasive", and the contemporary Historia compostellana says that he was "so eloquent that he could turn black into white and white into black", although he "was not of the great nobility" (non fuit tamen magnae nobilitatis).

== Family ==
Arias's father, Pedro Arias, was described as a "knight of Deza" (miles de Deza) in a document of 1115. Arias first met Diego Gelmírez, future Archbishop of Santiago de Compostela, in childhood. Diego's father Gelmirio was also a Galician knight. At some point Pedro granted an estate, a portion of a certain Villa nova, probably Vilanova de Arousa in Deza, to the church of nearby Compostela. His brother Luzo (Lucius) Arias made a similar donation. On 11 January 1096 Pedro and his brother subscribed a charter whereby Raymond of Galicia gave the village of Pastoriza in the parish of Brandariz in Deza to the monastery of Carboeiro (or Deza); they also signed side by side a document of 24 October 1102. Arias's origins among the lesser nobility is further confirmed by the description of his uncle in the Historia compostellan as of the milites (knights) and not the consules et comites ("consuls and counts", synonymous titles). Arias had a cousin named Leovigildo Luz, mentioned in the Historia, who was the son of his uncle. Arias's paternal grandfather, after whom he was named, was most likely the Arias Luzu who undersigned certain royal documents between 1066 and 1075, including a grant to Carboeiro. In 1062 he witnessed and possibly conducted the survey of an estate at Pastoriza later included in Raymond's 1096 grant to Carboeiro. Between 1095 and 1101 he became villicus terrae of Deza. His wife, Mayor, held land in the Salnés, as did Arias Pérez, who tried several times to acquire more.

== The Brotherhood ==
In 1107 Pedro Fróilaz de Traba, the guardian of the heir, Alfonso Raimúndez, rebelled against Queen Urraca and her new husband, Alfonso the Battler. According to the Historia, he was opposed by a "brotherhood" (germanitas) led by Arias Pérez (from 1110). It is possible that Pedro's rebellion represented a "Galician separatism" and Arias's brotherhood a "Leonese loyalism", but it is more probable that Pedro simply had the support of northwestern Galicia and Arias of the south. Arias got Diego Gelmírez, the most powerful churchman in Galicia, to accept the leadership of the brotherhood late in 1109 or early in 1110. In 1110 a truce between Pedro and the brotherhood was broken when the former took over the south Galician fortress of Castrelo de Miño and installed a garrison there under his wife Urraca and the young Alfonso. Arias promptly besieged it, and Pedro came to defend it. The besieged called on Diego to negotiate terms of surrender, which he did, but the brotherhood had grown suspicious of him and when a deal was struck Arias had Diego, Pedro, and Alfonso all arrested. In exchange for the castles of Oeste and A Lanzada, they were all soon released and Diego went over to the separatists. After the coronation of Alfonso and reconciliation of the Galicians with the queen in 1111, Arias was besieged in Lobeira with the aid of royal forces, and there he was captured in April 1112.

== Conflict with Diego Gelmírez ==
Late in 1113, when the royal court was in Galicia, Arias was inciting Urraca against Diego. She tried to confiscate the property of the three Bodán brothers from Deza, including the monastery of Bodaño or Budiño in Arias's area of interest. In 1120, according to the Historia, Urraca ordered the leading men (principes) of Galicia, including Arias Pérez, Fernando Yáñez, Bermudo Suárez, Juan Díaz, and others, to do homage (hominium) to Diego Gelmírez as "their lord, their patron, their king and their prince, saving their fealty to the queen" and recognise his rule (dominio). In 1121, however, after Diego had renewed his alliance with the Pedro Fróilaz de Traba, his power appeared to threaten that of the queen. In the summer of 1121 she had him arrested at Castrelo by Arias in collaboration with Fernando Yáñez and the former merino Juan Ramírez. Diego was imprisoned in Juan Díaz's castle at Orcellón. Around this time (1121/2) Arias patched up his feud with Pedro by marrying the latter's daughter Ildaria (Ilduara).

In the spring of 1126, shortly after Urraca's death and the accession of Alfonso, Arias led a rebellion in Galicia. Diego Gelmírez and Gómez Núñez of Toroño or perhaps Gutierre Vermúdez were charged per litteras ("by letter") with putting it down. Diego besieged Arias in Lobeiro and, with siege engines, in Tabeirós, forcing him to surrender. Shortly after 6 January 1129, at the funeral of Arias's mother-in-law, Mayor Rodríguez de Bárcena, Diego persuaded Arias to give up his half of the church/monastery at Arcos da Condesa in the Salnés. Diego's opinion of Arias was such that he said to him: "I fear, therefore, that if such that you are you leave this world, you will lose eternal life and incur the perpetual condemnation of your soul."
