= Gudesteus =

Gudesteus or Godesteus (Spanish: Gudesteo or Godesteo; Galician: Gudesteo or Gusteu) is a given name of Germanic origin, composed of the roots God- (God) and -þius, Gothic 𐌸𐌹𐌿𐍃, meaning 'servant'. It was common in the northwest of the Iberia peninsula in the tenth and eleventh centuries. In one document from 1001 it was given the spelling Gaudesteo. It may refer to:

- Gudesteus (bishop of Oviedo) (died 1069)
- Gudesteus (bishop of Iria) (died 1008 or 1012)
- Gudesteo González, captured at the Battle of Morella
