= Gudesteus (bishop of Iria) =

Gudesteus (Galician: Gudesteo) was the bishop of Iria Flavia from 1067, when he succeeded his uncle Cresconius, until his assassination in 1069. He was asleep with some of his clerics when the soldiers of "Count Froila Iliam" (perhaps Froila Arias), another of his uncles, murdered him, a crime which the Historia compostellana calls "the contrivance and treachery of the princes of Galicia", implicating the entire noble class.
