= Peter González =

Spanish Dominican friar and priest

Blessed Peter González OP
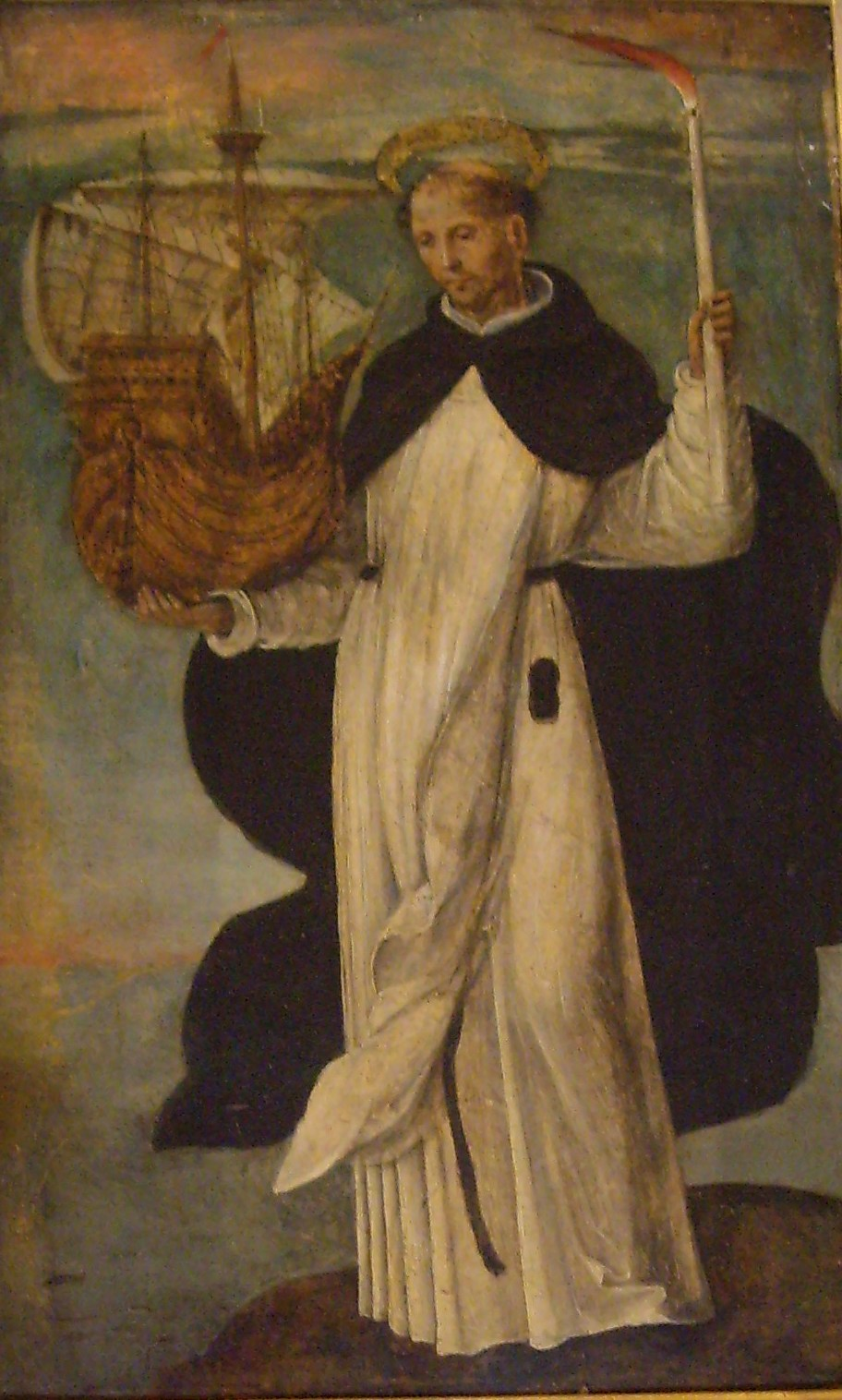
- 16th-century painting of the Blessed Peter González, by Alejo Fernández, in the Alcázar of Seville

Religious, priest and confessor
- Born: Pedro González; October 14, 1190; Frómista, Kingdom of Castile and Leon
- Died: 14 April 1246 (aged 55–56); Tui, Galicia, Kingdom of Castile and Leon
- Venerated in: Roman Catholic Church (Dominican Order)
- Beatified: 1254, Rome, Papal States, Pope Innocent IV; 13 December 1741, Rome, Papal States, Pope Benedict XIV (cultus confirmed)
- Feast: 14 April
- Attributes: Dominican holding a blue candle or a candle with a blue flame; Dominican lying on his cloak which is spread over hot coals; Dominican holding fire in his bare hands; Dominican catching fish with his bare hands; Dominican beside the ocean, often holding or otherwise protecting a ship
- Patronage: Sailors

Peter González Telmo (born Pedro González; 1190 – 15 April 1246), also known as Saint Elmo, was a Castilian Dominican friar and priest, born in 1190 in Frómista, Palencia, Kingdom of Castile and Leon.

== Biography ==
González was born in Castile, Spain, in 1190. González was educated by his uncle, the Bishop of Astorga, who gave him a canonry when he was very young.

On one occasion, he was riding triumphantly into the city, his horse stumbled, dumping him into the mud to the amusement of onlookers. Humbled, the canon reevaluated his vocation and later resigned his position to enter the Dominican Order. González became a renowned preacher; crowds gathered to hear him and numberless conversions were the result of his efforts.

He spent much of his time as a court preacher. After King Ferdinand III of Castile and Leon captured Córdoba, González was successful in restraining the soldiers from pillaging the city. He also worked for the humane treatment of Moorish prisoners.

After retiring from the court, González devoted the remainder of his life to preaching in northwest Spain, and developed a special mission to Spanish and Portuguese seamen. He died on 15 April 1246 at Tui and is buried in the local cathedral.

== Veneration ==
González was beatified in 1254 by Pope Innocent IV. Although he was never formally canonized, his cultus was confirmed in 1741 by Pope Benedict XIV.

The diminutive "Elmo" (or "Telmo") belongs properly to the martyr-bishop Erasmus of Formia (died c. 303), one of the Fourteen Holy Helpers. However, as Erasmus is the patron saint of sailors generally, and Peter González of Spanish and Portuguese sailors specifically, they have both been popularly invoked as "Saint Elmo." He is thus called “Saint Peter Thelmo” and is the patron of a parish in Aparri, Cagayan, Philippines. The San Telmo barrio in Buenos Aires also takes its name from him.
