= Diego Gelmírez =

11/12th-century Galician bishop and historiographer

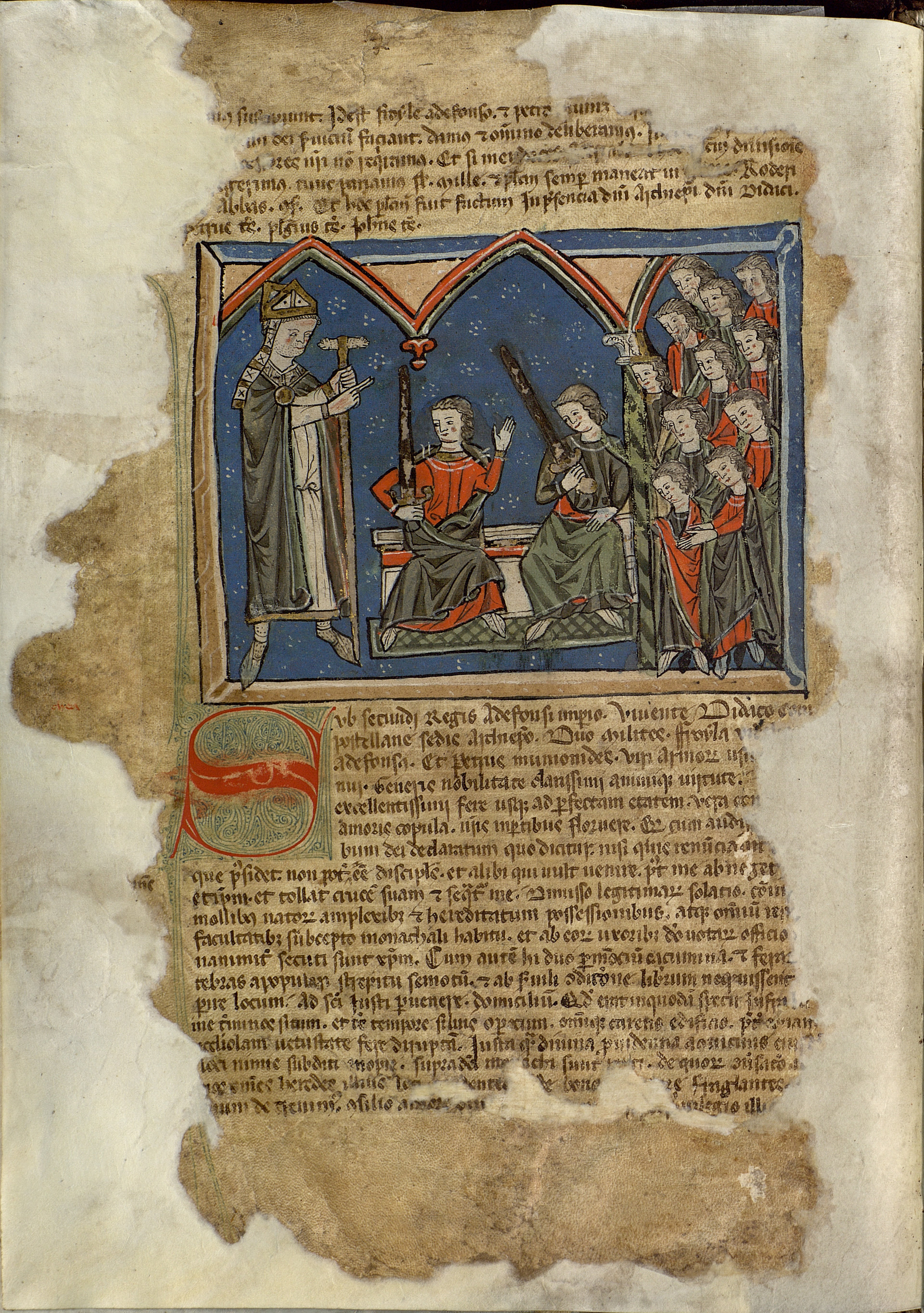
Diego Gelmirez in the 13th century manuscript Tumbo de Touxos Outos

Diego Gelmírez or Xelmírez (Latin: Didacus Gelmirici; c. 1069 – c. 1140) was the second bishop (from 1100) and first archbishop (from 1120) of the Catholic Archdiocese of Santiago de Compostela in Galicia, modern Spain. He is a prominent figure in the history of Galicia and an important historiographer of the Iberia of his day. Diego involved himself in many quarrels, ecclesiastical and secular, which were recounted in the Historia Compostelana, which covered his episcopacy from 1100 to 1139 and serves as a sort of gesta of the bishop's life.

== Background ==
He was probably born at Catoira, where his father, Gelmiro or Xelmirio, was the custodian of the castle. He received an education at the court of Alfonso VI, king of León, Galicia and Castile. In 1092, Raymond, count of Galicia, named him his notary and secretary and in 1093 he was the administrator of the Compostelan church. In 1094, Dalmatius was appointed the first bishop of Compostela. Dalmatius died the next year (1095), shortly after returning from the Council of Clermont in which the authority of the see of Iria Flavia was transferred to Compostela, and the people of the see requested the king nominate Diego administrator again during the vacancy.

== Episcopacy ==
In 1099, the pope authorised a new episcopal election and Diego was elected in 1100. He was anointed the second bishop of Compostela at Easter, 1101, and was granted a pallium by Pope Paschal II the following year, despite not yet being the head of a metropolitan see. During his tenure, he was given secular rule of the city by Alfonso and he strove to make Compostela a major pilgrimage destination. He increased the prestige of his see and the volume of pilgrims on the road to Compostela.

In 1107 Pedro Fróilaz de Traba, the guardian of the heir, Alfonso Raimúndez, rebelled against Queen Urraca and her new husband, Alfonso the Battler. According to the Historia, he was opposed by a "brotherhood" (germanitas) led by the knight Arias Pérez and Diego Gelmírez, who had known each other since childhood. Diego Gelmírez had accepted the leadership of the brotherhood late in 1109 or early in 1110. In 1110 a truce between Pedro and the brotherhood was broken when the former took over the south Galician fortress of Castrelo de Miño and installed a garrison there under his wife Urraca and the young Alfonso. Arias promptly besieged it, and Pedro came to defend it. The besieged called on Diego to negotiate terms of surrender, which he did, but the brotherhood had grown suspicious of him and when a deal was struck Arias had Diego, Pedro, and Alfonso all arrested. In exchange for the castles of Oeste and Lanzada, they were all soon released and Diego went over to the separatists. In 1111, Diego crowned Alfonso Raimúndez King of Galicia in opposition to Urraca and her husband.

Late in 1113, when the royal court was in Galicia, Arias was inciting Urraca against Diego. Urraca deprived him of his secular authority at the request of the people, who agitated for communal rights, but she reinstated him in his temporal powers within a year and even exempted him from all military service to the crown and extended his charge over the whole diocese.

In 1120, Pope Callixtus II elevated Diego and his see to archiepiscopal rank and appointed him papal legate to Spain. That same year, according to the Historia, Urraca ordered the leading men (principes) of Galicia, including Arias Pérez, to do homage (hominium) to Diego Gelmírez as "their lord, their patron, their king and their prince, saving their fealty to the queen" and recognise his rule (dominio). In 1121, however, after Diego had renewed his alliance with Pedro Fróilaz de Traba, his power appeared to threaten that of the queen. In the summer of 1121 she had Diego arrested at Castrelo in collaboration with Arias Pérez. Diego was imprisoned for a while, but the support of the people, which he had been cultivating, compelled his release. Sometime in 1121 Munio Peláez built an "adulterine" (i.e. illegal) castle on the river Iso near Compostela. The Historia Compostelana calls it a "den of robbers and bandits", and Diego managed to raze it to the ground soon after it was built.

In the spring of 1126, shortly after Urraca's death and the accession of Alfonso, Arias led a rebellion in Galicia. Diego Gelmírez and Gómez Núñez of Toroño or perhaps Gutierre Vermúdez were charged per litteras ("by letter") with putting it down. Diego besieged Arias in Lobeiro and, with siege engines, in Tabeirós, forcing him to surrender. Diego's opinion of Arias was such that he said to him: "I fear, therefore, that if such that you are you leave this world, you will lose eternal life and incur the perpetual condemnation of your soul."

== Sources ==
- Biggs, Anselm Gordon. Diego Xelmírez. Xerais, 1983. ISBN 84-7507-100-7
- Reilly, Bernard F. The Kingdom of León-Castilla under Queen Urraca.
- Reilly, Bernard F. "The Historia Compostelana: The Genesis and Composition of a Twelfth-Century Spanish Gesta," in Speculum 44 (1969): pp 78–85
- Vones, Ludwig, Die 'Historia Compostelana und die Kirchenpolitik des nordwestspanischen Raumes (Cologne, 1980)
- Falque, Emma, "The Manuscript Transmission of the 'Historia Compostellana," in Manuscripta (1985): pp 80–90
- Richard A. Fletcher (1984), Saint James's Catapult: The Life and Times of Diego Gelmírez of Santiago de Compostela (Oxford: Oxford University Press)
- Saunders, Tracy, St. James' Rooster (El Báculo de Santiago) offers a fictionalised version of the early days of the cathedral of Santiago, and the machinations of its first archbishop, Diego Gelmirez. iUniverse, 2011, Bóveda/Algaida, 2012.
