= Ribadumia =

Coordinates: 42°31′N 8°45′W

Concello de Ribadumia
- Coat of arms

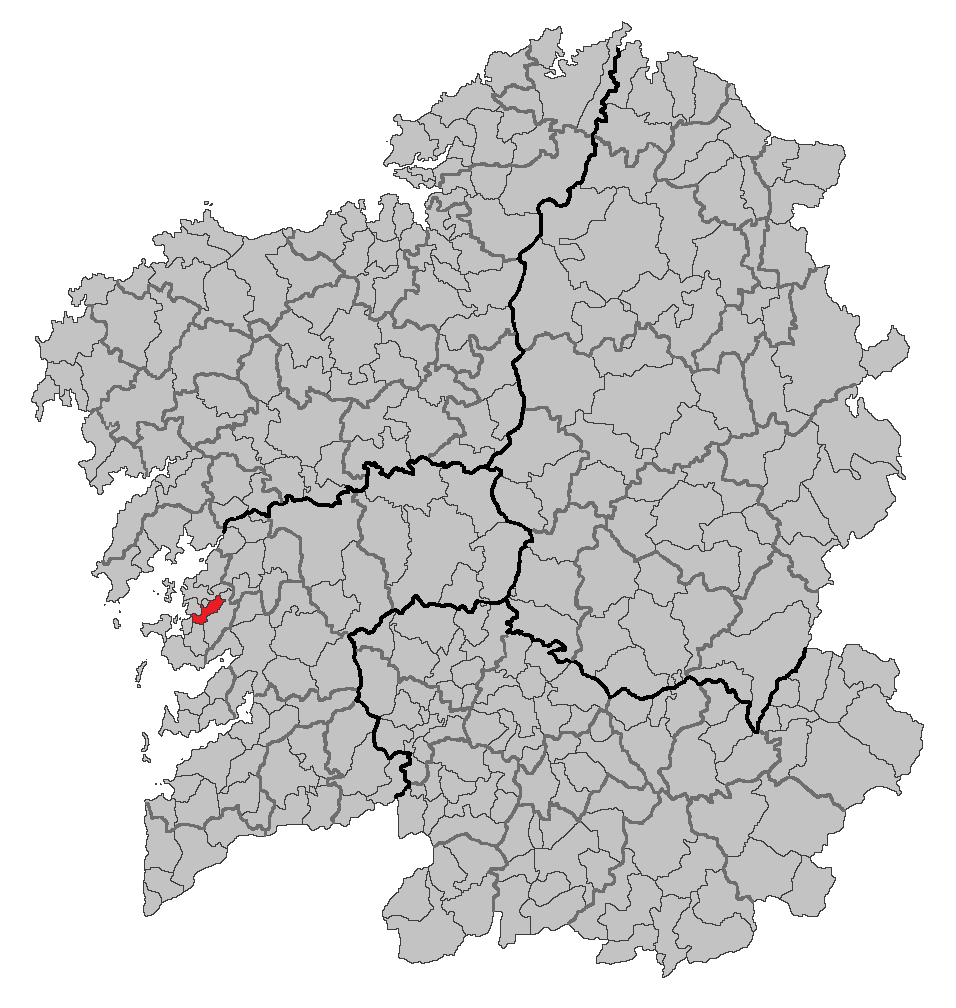
- Situation of Ribadumia within Galicia

Population (2025-01-01)
  - Total: 5,171
- Time zone: UTC+1 (CET)
  - Summer (DST): UTC+2 (CET)

Ribadumia is a municipality in Galicia, Spain in the province of Pontevedra.

In 1151, in the parroquia of Barrantes now in Ribadumia, a group tried to found a monastery with the help of the local magnate Gómez Núñez, but their efforts came to nothing.

== See also ==
- List of municipalities in Pontevedra
