= Gómez Núñez =

Galician and Portuguese military and political leader

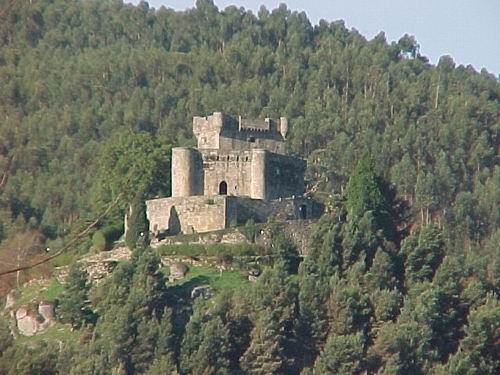
Castle of Sobroso, one of a string along the Galician–Portuguese border held by Gómez. This one was taken by Urraca during her punitive expedition against Gómez in 1116, but she herself ended up besieged and defeated in it.

Gómez Núñez (or Gomes Nunes in Portuguese; floruit 1071–1141) was a Galician and Portuguese political and military leader in the Kingdom of León. His power lay in the valley of the Minho, mainly on the north side, bounded by the Atlantic on the west and corresponding approximately with the Diocese of Tui. There, according to a contemporary source, he had "a strong site, a fence of castles and a multitude of knights and infantry."

In the civil wars of the reign of Urraca (1109–26), he favoured her son, the future Alfonso VII (1126–57), and is counted among the Galician leaders of the latter's cause, with Diego Gelmírez and Pedro Fróilaz de Traba. In the early 1120s, after peace had been made between Urraca and Alfonso, he was an ally of Theresa, Countess of Portugal, and her lover, Fernando Pérez. He initially supported Alfonso against Theresa's son, Afonso Henriques, but his last public act was to throw his support behind Afonso's incipient Kingdom of Portugal. He died in exile.

== Civil wars of Urraca's reign ==
Portuguese historians have usually considered Gómez a brother of Alfonso Núñez, who was the eldest son of Nuño Velázquez and Fronilde Sánchez. In a charter of the monastery of Sahagún dated 1104, however, Alfonso is named alongside his siblings Menendo, Elvira, and Sancho, with no mention of a Gómez. In other sources Gómez's brother is named Fernando. In a document of 1127 this Fernando names his father as Nuño Menéndez, probably a cousin of Nuño Velázquez. According to one Portuguese historian, Gómez's mother was Sancha Viegas, daughter of Egas Gómez, but she is not recorded as the wife of either Nuño Velázquez or Nuño Menéndez, whose wife, who appears with her husband in a charter a few days before his death in 1071, was Goncinha (Goncina). Nuño Menéndez rebelled against García II of Galicia in 1071 and was defeated and killed.

Gómez married Elvira Pérez, daughter of Pedro Fróilaz de Traba and Mayor Rodríguez de Bárcena, by 1117 at the latest. His children were Fernando and María, who married Fernando Yáñez. This marriage alliance introduced Fernando into the highest circle of Spanish politics.

The first record of Gómez dates from March 1110, when he held the fortress of São Cristóvão (Felgueiras) on behalf of Henry, Count of Portugal. He was still holding it the next year (1111). By April 1112 he held the office of majordomo, the highest at court, and he remained with Portuguese court even after Henry's death, until 1114. By November 1115 he held the rank of count (comes), the highest title in the kingdom, and was back in Galicia. where he swore an oath to defend Diego Gelmírez's rights under a recent treaty with the queen. In 1116 Urraca launched an attack on Gómez's Galician lands, but it was repulsed with the aid of Pedro Fróilaz and Theresa, who besieged her in Sobroso.

In 1117 Gómez aided in the suppression of the revolt of the citizens of Santiago de Compostela. In 1118 he was serving Alfonso, still in opposition to his mother, as alcalde of Talavera de la Reina. That year he was with the army that he forced Alfonso the Battler out of Castile and subsequently declared Alfonso VII rex Hispaniae ("King of Spain") at Toledo. In 1121 he rejoined the other defenders of Diego Gelmírez in Compostela to reaffirm the pact of 1115.

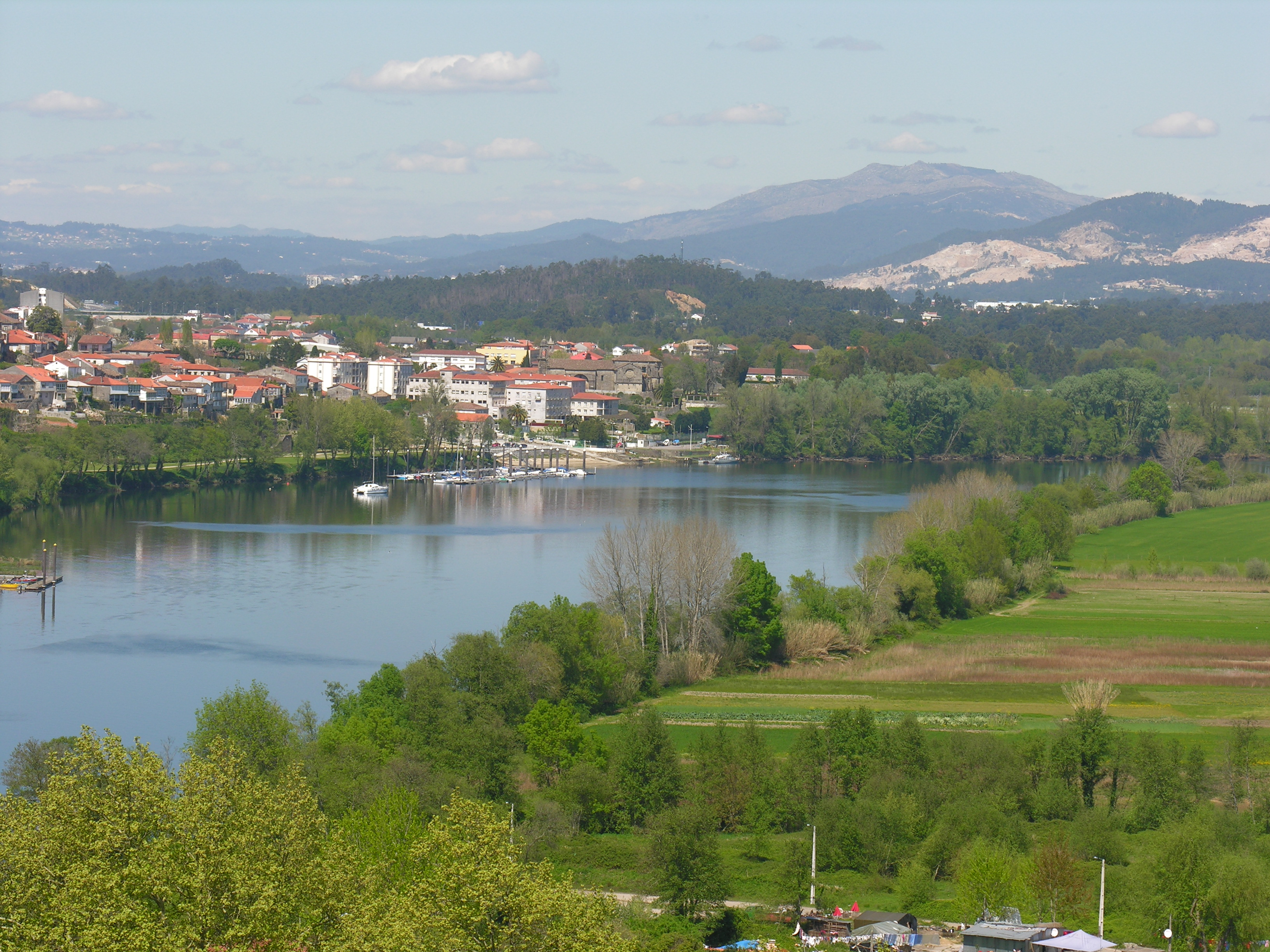
The Minho as it flows by Tui, the mountainous power base of Gómez Núñez, guarded, in his time, by a string of castles.

== Service to Alfonso VII ==
By April 1120 Gómez was at the Portuguese court again, where he remained until at least September 1125. During this period he enabled Theresa and Fernando to hold Tui and Ourense north of the Minho. In March 1126, after the Treaty of Ricobayo was signed between the Portugal rulers and the new Leonese king, Alfonso VII, Gómez and his son-in-law, along with most of the Galician nobility swore an oath of fealty to Alfonso at Zamora. It is unknown if Gómez was present at Ricobayo for the negotiations with the Portuguese, but by the resultant treaty Theresa and Fernando lost control of Tui, Ourense, and other districts north of the Minho. Later that spring, there was a rebellion in Galicia under Arias Pérez, and Gómez Núñez and Diego Gelmírez were charged with putting it down. They besieged Lobeira and Arias' other castles, and forced his surrender.

When Gómez's uncle, a certain Count Fernando died sometime before 1126, half of the monastery of San Salvador de Budiño (Botinio), which had belonged to their family since its foundation at an unknown date, escheated to the crown in accordance with a judicial ruling. In 1126, shortly after his succession and after Gómez's displays of loyalty, Alfonso VII donated his half of the monastery to Gómez and his brother Fernando. On 26 July the brothers—with Gómez owning three quarters—donated the whole monastery, with all the churches and lands it possessed, to the Benedictine Abbey of Cluny, a longtime ally of the Leonese monarchy. Although the charter by which Alfonso restored half of the monastery to the Núñez brothers is lost, the king confirmed the donation by a royal privilege of August 1142, at the request of Peter the Venerable, the Cluniac abbot then visiting Spain. This surviving charter records that the boundaries of the monastery's estate were surveyed by royal order at the insistence of Gómez in 1126.

Between February 1129 and March 1131 Gómez was entrusted with the tenencia (fief) of Toroño in Galicia. While the Chronica Adefonsi imperatoris (book I, §74) reports that he joined Rodrigo Pérez de Traba in revolt against Alfonso in 1136, in support of the Portuguese and Navarrese, who contrived to invade León–Castile simultaneously from both sides. This is probably a mistake, conflating Gómez's actual participation in Rodrigo's revolt of c.1140 with an earlier revolt in which Rodrigo played a part.

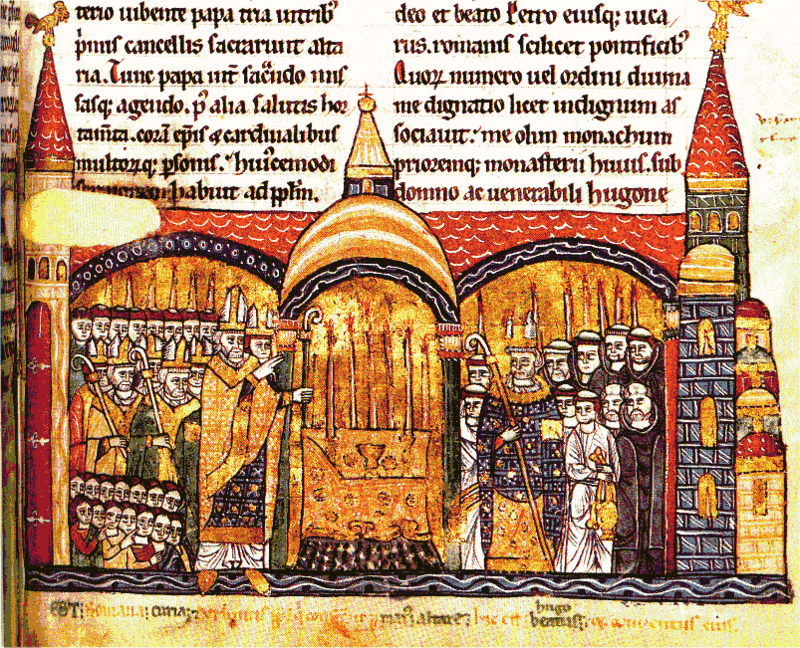
Twelfth-century depiction of Cluny and its monks. Gómez became one after he supported the failed Portuguese invasion of 1141. He had forged ties with the monastery with a large donation in 1126.

== Final rebellion and exile ==
In 1138 Gómez held the government of Tui, also in Galicia. He is called comes Tudensis (Count of Tui) in contemporary documents of Alfonso VII, although his countship was jurisdictional only. It is not clear how long it lasted. A document of 1151 reports a failed attempt to establish a Benedictine monastery at Barrantes in the region Tui and how the lay patrons of the new foundation were supported by the lord of the region (dominus terrae), Gómez at the time. Also in 1138 Gómez made a donation to Celanova, a large and influential Benedictine house in Galicia, and his wealth and power at the time are indicated by the presence of three clerici (clerics) at his court, serving as chaplains and secretaries.

Gómez had been a loyal supporter, though only an occasional courtier, of Alfonso VII from 1126, but sometime between 1138 and 1140 he changed his allegiance to Afonso Henriques, the son of Henry of Portugal. In 1141 Gómez supported the Portuguese invasion of Galicia and was forced into exile, taking refuge in Cluny. A partiality for Benedictine monasticism seems evident, although in 1128 Gómez had made a donation to the Knights Templar, whose rule and organisation was based on that of the Cistercians.
