= Turonio =

Turonio (Galician Toronho, Spanish Toroño, Latin Turonium or Toronium) was the only part of the Conventus Bracarensis which did not join Afonso Henriques when he proclaimed the independence of Portugal in 1139. At the time it was a fief held by Gómez Núñez, who supported a Portuguese invasion of Galicia, but was defeated and exiled by Alfonso VII of León.

Turonio lies south of the Ria de Vigo and the river Verdugo and north and west of the river Minho. As a placename it is rarely used today, but is in the process of recovery. Today most of the territory is a part of the city of Vigo.
