= Tui Cathedral =

Catholic church in Galicia, Spain

Coordinates: 42.0461°N 8.6447°W

- Catedral de Santa María de Tui
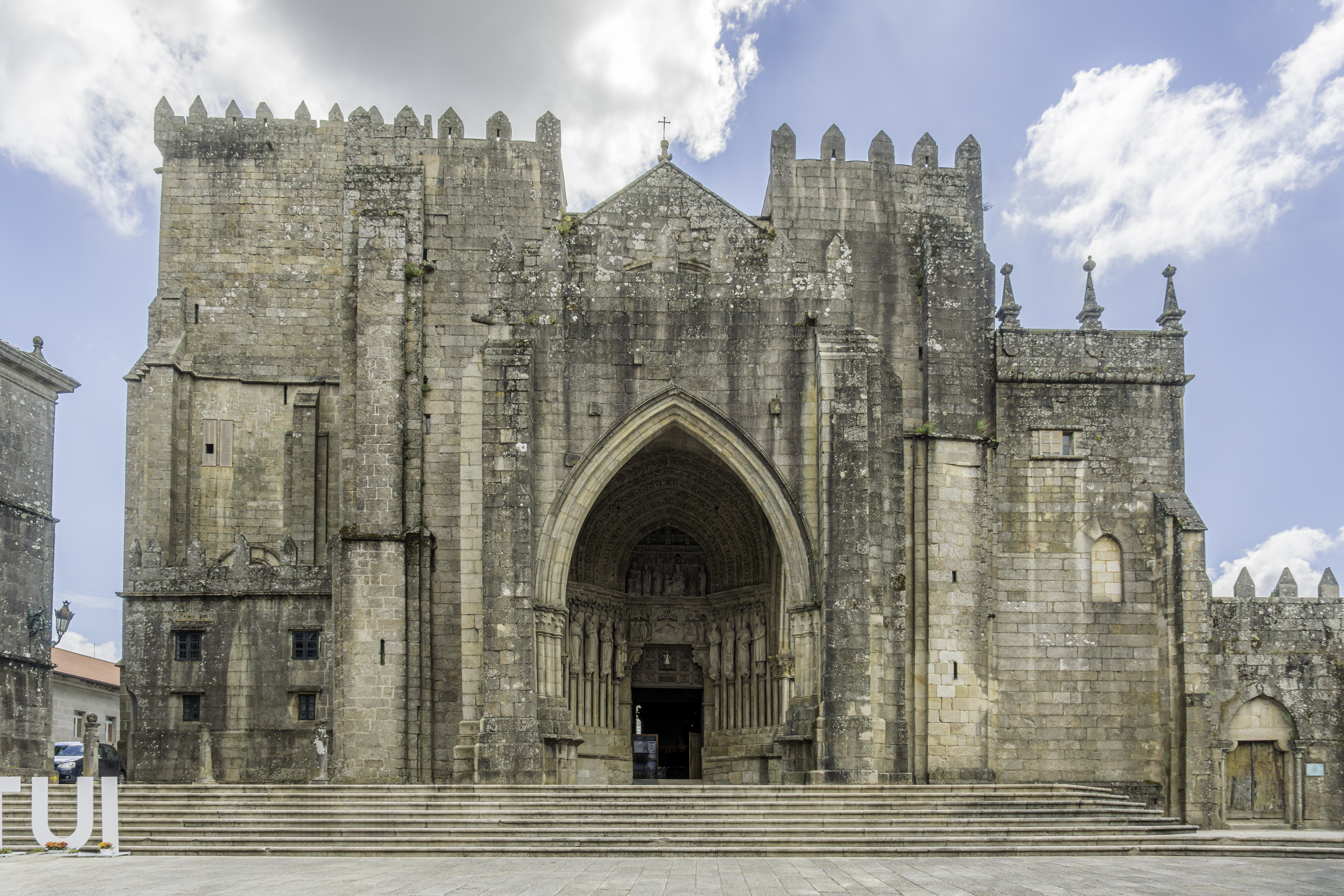
- West façade.

Religion
- Affiliation: Roman Catholic
- Ecclesiastical or organizational status: Cathedral

Location
- Location: Tui, Galicia, Spain
- Interactive map of Tui Cathedral

Architecture
- Style: Romanesque, Gothic, Baroque
- Direction of façade: West

Tui Cathedral is a late-Romanesque and Gothic-style Roman Catholic church in the town of Tui, in Galicia, Spain. It is located at San Fernando square, in the center of the town.

== History ==
Its construction began at the end of the 11th century, and it was first mentioned in 1095 in a deed of donation by the Counts of Galicia, Raymond of Burgundy and Urraca. It is believed that its builders took the Santiago de Compostela Cathedral as their model, with an ambulatory and a transept with three aisles. The building is an example of late-Romanesque architecture, and its influence can be seen in other churches in the Miño valley.

The west facade however is of Gothic style, completed in the early 13th century. The main gate is considered the first Gothic sculptural ensemble on the Iberian Peninsula, attributed to French stonemasons. The gate is complemented by a portico built around 1250, which extends the sacred space of the temple towards the square in front of the building.

Peter Gonzalez, a Castilian Dominican friar and priest, was buried here in 1246. In the second half of the 13th century, the cloister was built in the Cistercian Gothic style. The main chapel located in the choir was completed in 1699 by Castro Canseco. The interior has a large prominent retablo de la Expectacion, and a large altar of relics in the Chapel of the Relics.
