= Ancilla Dei =

Term in early Christian inscriptions

The term ancilla Dei (Latin for 'handmaid of God') is an expression found in patristic literature, for example employed as an address in letters by Augustine.

In early Christian inscriptions the title ancilla Dei is often given to a deceased woman. From the meaning attached to this term in the Middle Ages it has sometimes been assumed that the persons so qualified in the first age of Christianity were consecrated virgins.

The inscriptions containing this formula are of two classes: one, in which it is merely stated that a given person was ancilla Dei; the other, from which it is clear that this title was sometimes given to persons who certainly were not religious. The former class is the more numerous, but one of the latter is quite explicit. This informs us that a certain monument was erected by a husband to his wife, whom he styles Dei ancilla: "[Laur]entius Rufine coniugi Dei anci[llae]...". In a Roman inscription of the first quarter of the sixth century a certain Gutte[s] is referred to as ancilla Dei, and it is further stated that she was nonn[a] (nun): "in presence of the nun Gutte[s], a handmaid of God" ("sub presentiâ nonnes Guttes, ancille Dei"). This reference shows that even in the sixth century, ancilla Dei is a title not peculiar to religious persons; the author regarded it as necessary to state explicitly that she was nonnes. From the pontificate of Pope Gregory I (590–604), however, only nuns, as a rule, were qualified by this title.
