= Monastery of Carboeiro =

Monastery in Silleda, Spain

San Lourenzo de Carboeiro
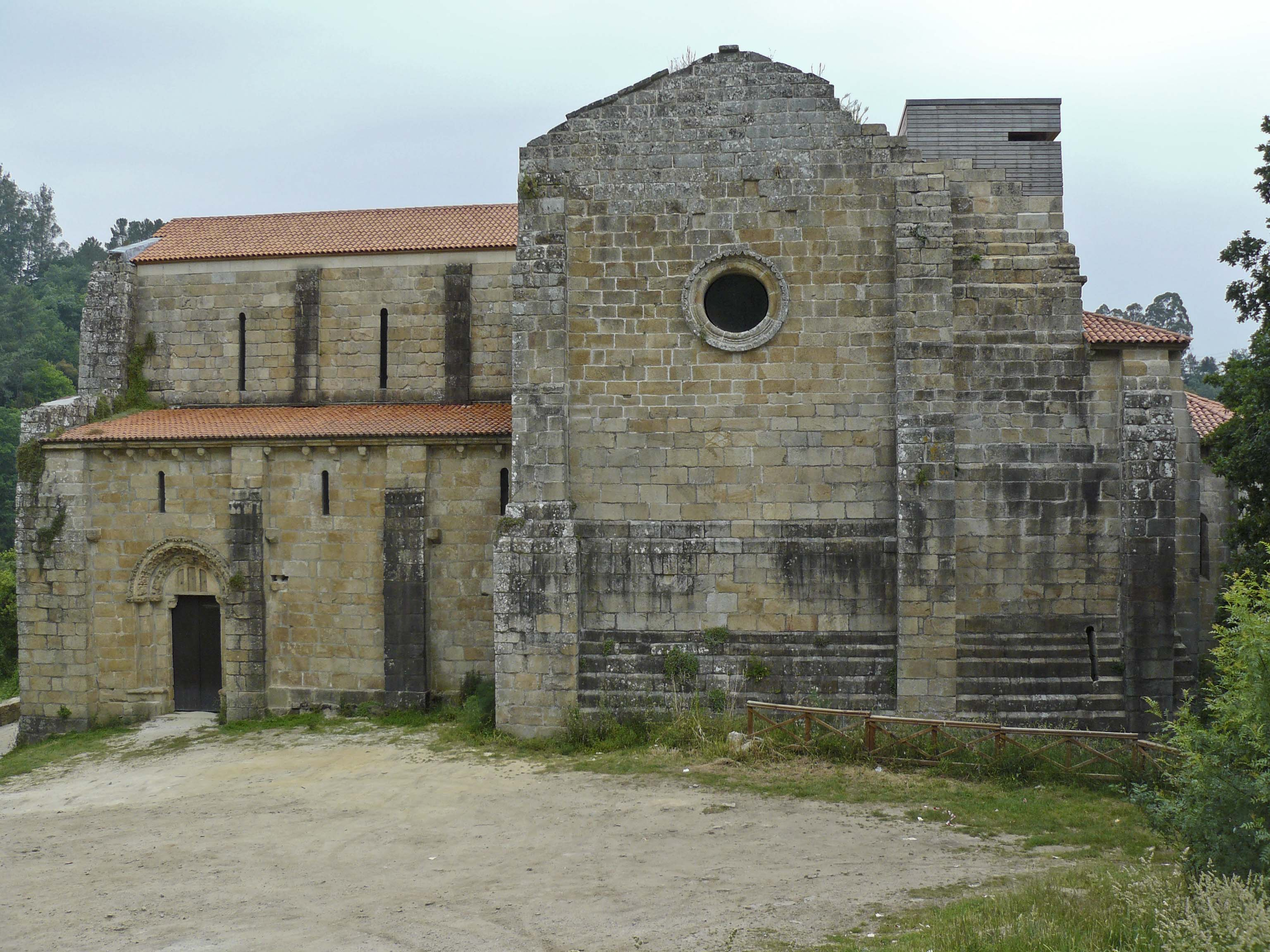
- Viewed from the south
- Interactive map of San Lourenzo de Carboeiro

Monastery information
- Order: Benedictine
- Established: 10th century
- Diocese: Lugo

Site
- Location: Pontevedra, Galicia, Spain
- Coordinates: 42°45′18.09″N 8°14′48.34″W

The Monastery of San Lourenzo de Carboeiro is one of the most outstanding architectural works of the late Romanesque, the transition to the Gothic, in Galicia.

It is a Benedictine monastery founded in the 10th century. Its moments of greatest splendor were between 11th and 13th centuries. The church and some other buildings are still in good condition, after the works of restoration and recovery made during the second half of the twentieth century.

== Gallery ==
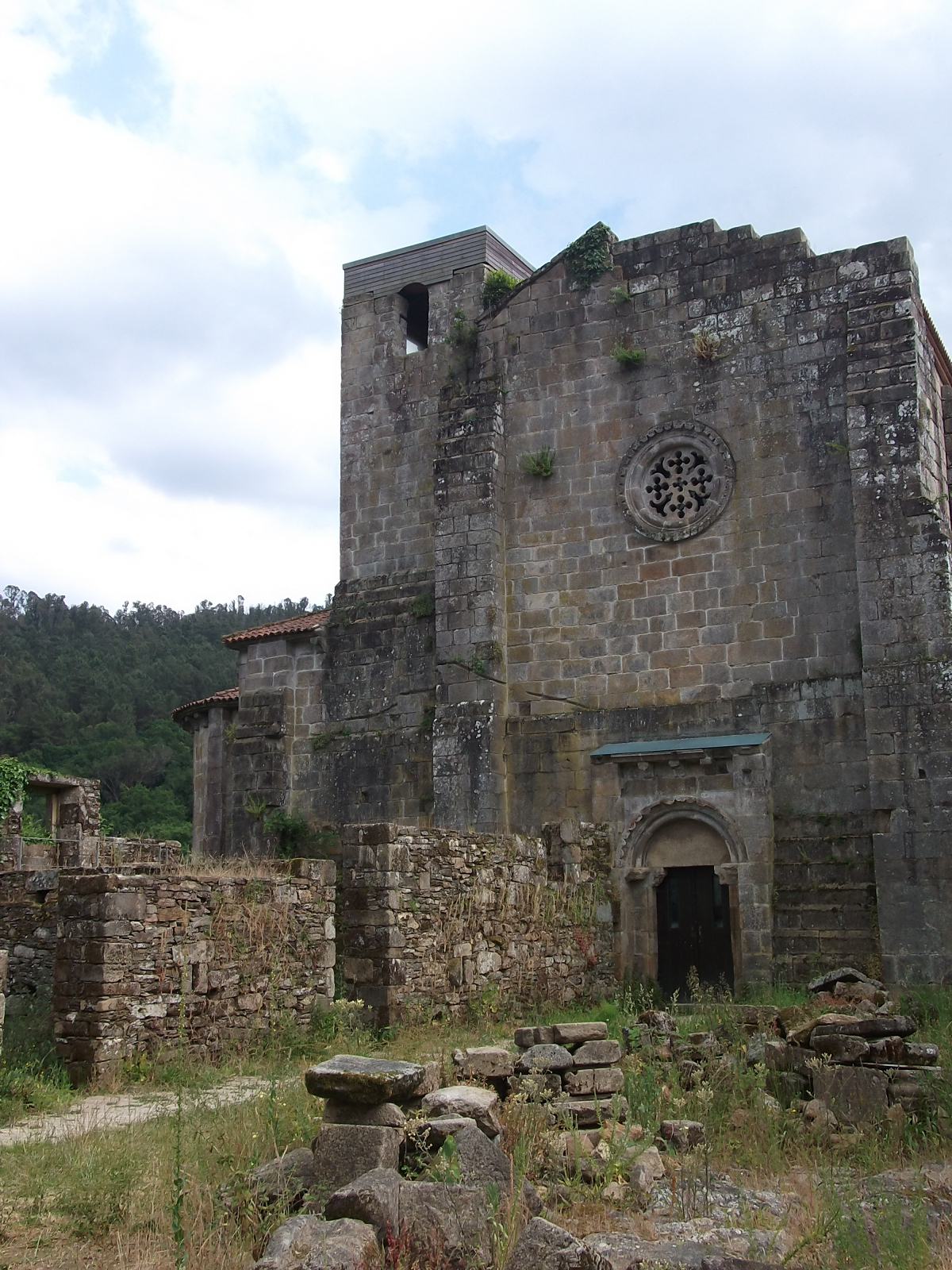

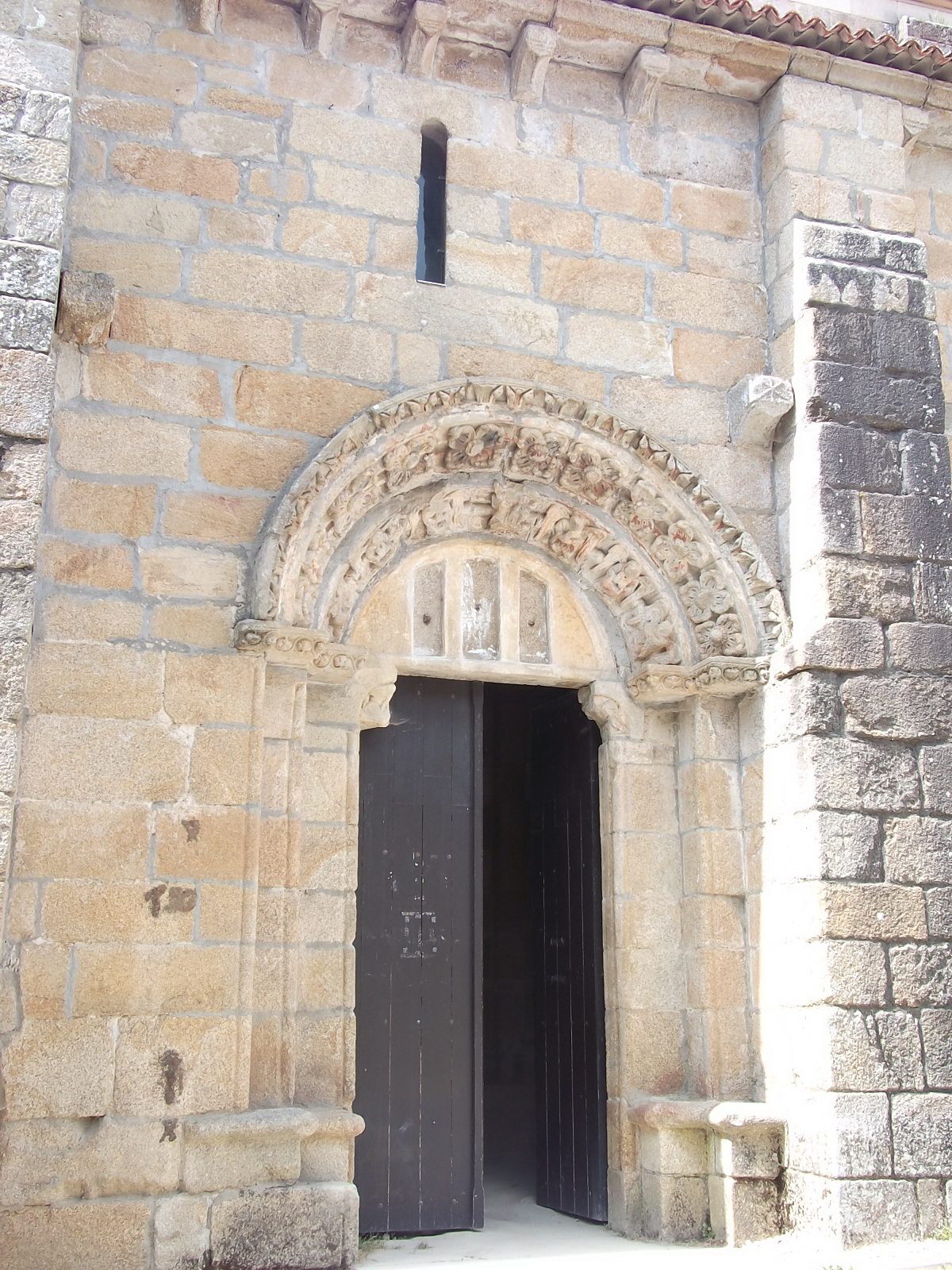

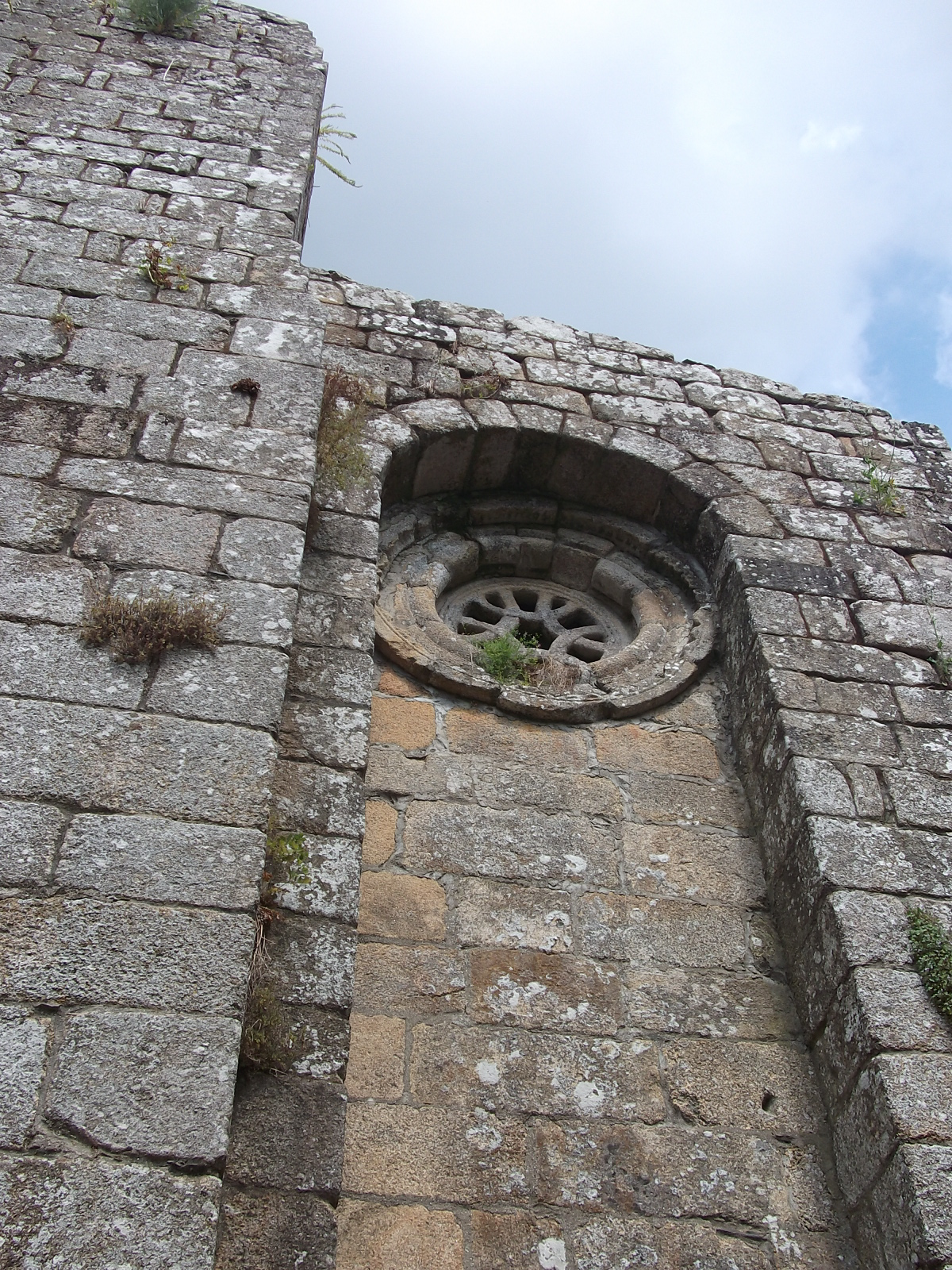

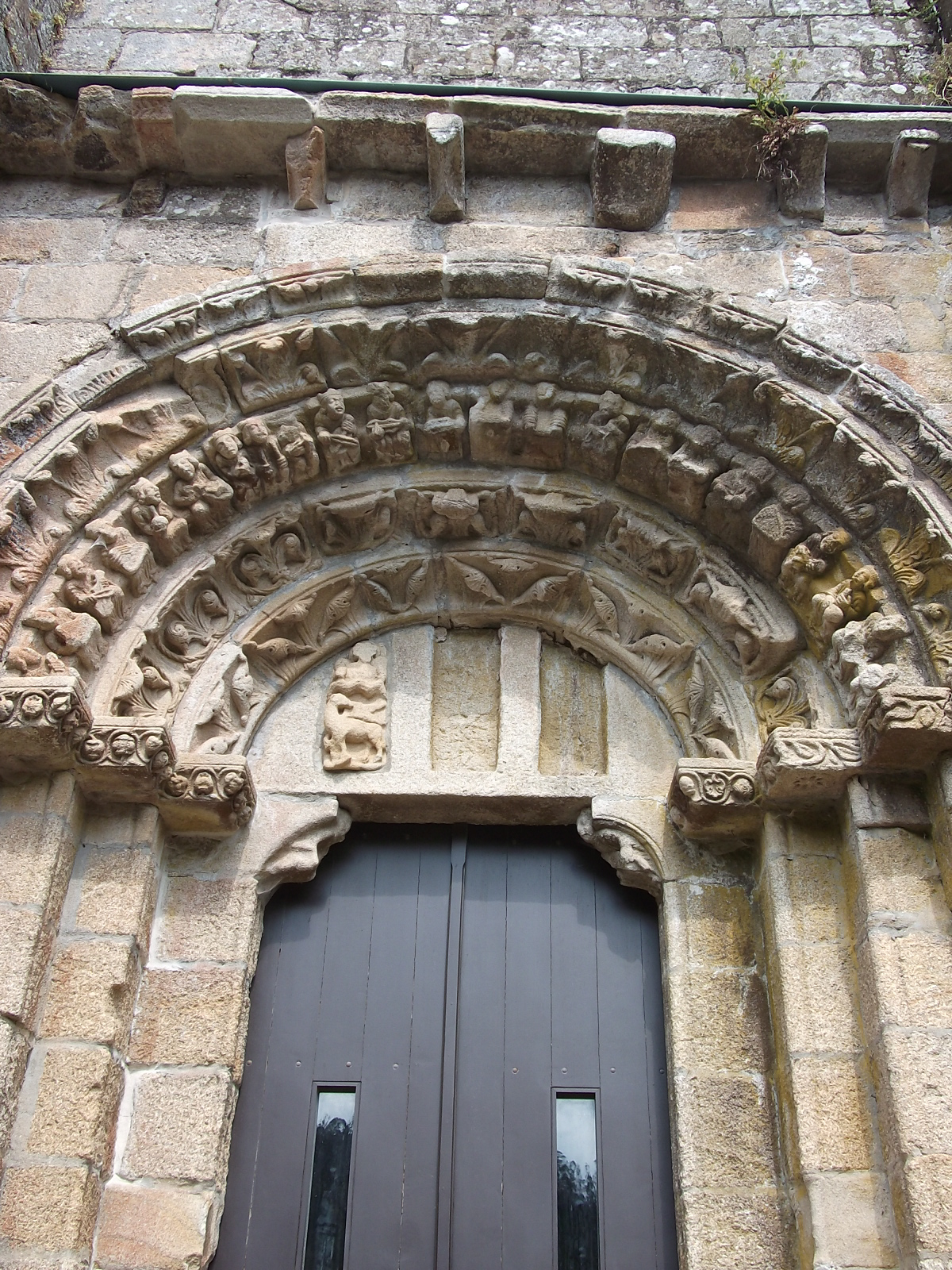

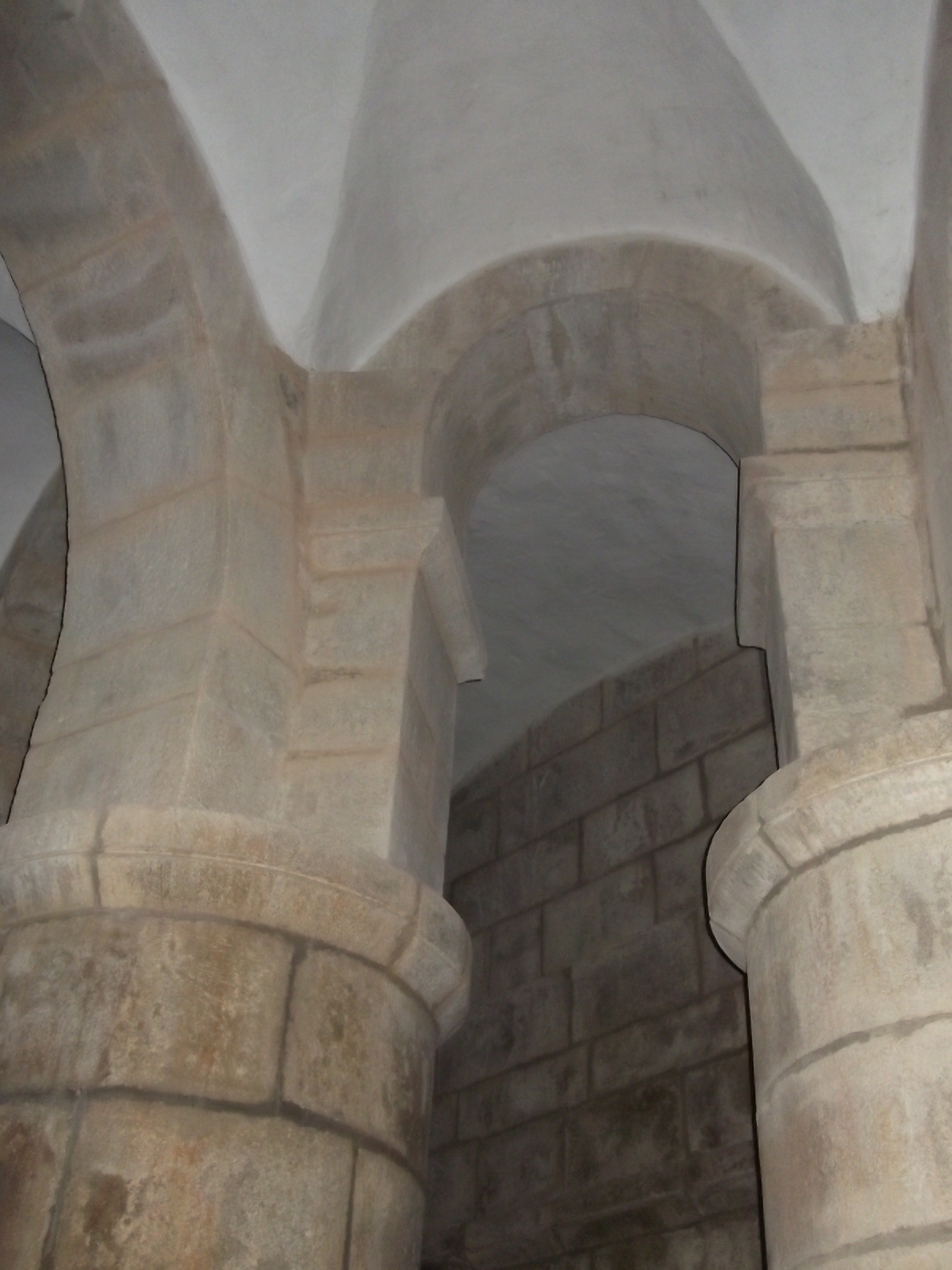

== See also ==
- Moreruela Abbey

== Bibliography ==
- Vázquez, Armando (2001). Carboeiro. El Arte que Renace de sus Cenizas. Concello de Silleda. Móstoles, Madrid. ISBN 84-606-3101-X.
