= Historia Compostelana =

Anonymously-written chronicle of Galician history from 1100 to 1139

"Aragonese deliver the castle to the queen. Oh!!, How much military glory gave to Galicians that day when the Aragonese king escaped in front of them!. But much was more excellent and cheerful when the brave forces of Galicia protected Castile and its knights from attack by enemies and forced to take back the Castle occupied by the Aragonese. Oh shame!!, the Castilians need foreign forces and are protected by the audacity of the Galicians!. What will happen with these cowardly knights when Galicia's armies -their shield and protection- leave?."

— Historia Compostellana, Book I, Chapter 90

The Historia Compostelana (fully titled in Latin: De rebus gestis D. Didaci Gelmirez, primi Compostellani Archiepiscopi) is a historical chronicle by several authors based on the relation of events by a writer in the immediate circle of Diego Gelmírez, second bishop (1100–1120) then first archbishop (1120–1140) of Compostela, one of the major figures of the Middle Ages in Galicia. The primary narrative of the Historia Compostelana spans the years 1100 – 1139, the years of Gelmírez' tenure, in three books. Its twofold central agenda is to extol the Archbishop's doings, while establishing the foundation and rights of Santiago de Compostela, including its founding legend, which provided apostolic connections with Saint James the Great. The bishopric had been transferred from Iria Flavia to Compostela as recently as 1095.

From a Galician perspective, the Historia recounts the reigns of the contemporary sovereigns of Castile: Alfonso VI (until 1109), Urraca (1109–1126) and Alfonso VII (from 1126). "A very complex work of multiple authorship, it must be used with care, for it is essentially an episcopal gesta of Diego Gelmírez, bishop and then archbishop of Santiago de Compostela, and very partisan in its commentary," is the assessment of the major historian of this period, Bernard F. Reilly.

In the context of Hispanic historiography in Latin, it is unique for narrating contemporary events and utilizing documents inserted in the text, giving it great historical value.

== Historical Account pre-1093 ==
The Historia contains an account of the translation of the body of St. James to Galicia in the first century AD in its opening chapter. It says that the body was brought to the forest of Libredón, near the river Sar, and buried by several disciples in a marble tomb. The account goes on to claim that Christianity was then lost in Spain for a period and restored before the Muslim conquest of Spain.

The tomb was lost until the bishop Theodemir in the ninth century, when God sought to "change the fortune of the Church" by revealing its location. The second chapter of Book I describes its discovery and the confirmation of the relics by Alfonso II, before beginning an ecclesiastical history of Compostela from the early ninth century until the episcopacy of Diego Peláez. During this period, the episcopal seat was shared between the old centre of Iria Flavia and the emerging centre of Compostela.

Chapters II-IX contains a list of Irian-Compostelan bishops. An early bishop, Adaulfo II, was accused of sodomy by his jealous rivals and sentenced to trial by bullfight; as Adaulfo was innocent, the bull did not charge him. He was followed by Sisnando, who was noted as a pious man, and Hermenegildo (d. 951), who was unpopular and considered a thief. Bishop Sisnando II was imprisoned by Sancho I of León, and then battled Rosendo (d. 968), who succeeded him as bishop. In 985 Bishop Pelayo Rodríguez was apparently removed by Bermudo II and replaced by Pedro de Mozonzo; in retribution, his father is said to have encouraged Almanzor to sack Compostela. However, Manuel Suárez notes that Pelayo may have simply retired to Celanovas, and it is highly unlikely that the sack of Compostela happened at the behest of a minor nobleman.

The bishop following the sack of Compostela was Pelayo Díaz, who was removed from the seat by force: the Historia says he was seen as an usurper and therefore an illegitimate bishop. His brother Vimara Díaz then became bishop of Iria-Compostela. Vimara was likewise unpopular and was drowned in the River Miño by the Galician nobility. Bishop Cresconio (d. 1066-67) repelled a Viking invasion from Compostela and built walls around the city. His nephew Gudesteo succeeded him but was removed (likely killed) by the count Froilan after a dispute in 1069.

The next bishop of Iria-Compostela was Diego Peláez. It was during this period, around 1075, that construction of the Romanesque cathedral of Santiago de Compostela, replacing the building which had stood there since the ninth century. The Historia Compostelana speaks well of Peláez, though admits that he involved himself in affairs unsuited to his office. The business in question was clarified later in the history as attempting to free García II of Galicia from prison and rebel against Alfonso VI of León and Castile by reinstating Galicia as an independent kingdom. Peláez was apparently involved with William I of England in this endeavour, but was deposed in 1086 before the plan could be implemented. After the deposition of Bishop Peláez, the see of Iria-Compostela was left without a bishop, instead being ruled by a combination of the nobility and temporary prelates. The nobles appointed Pedro of Cardeña as bishop, but this was not approved by the pope, and he was deemed illegitimate and deposed within two years. Another bishop was appointed around 1090, Pedro Vimáraz, but he was described as cruel and died "bitterly" not long after. Though Vimáraz arranged the marriage of Urraca to Raymond of Burgundy and the latter's appointment as Count of Galicia, both seen as positive developments, the history laments the disarray within the canonry which occurred during his brief rule.

== Episcopacy of Diego Gelmírez ==
Diego Gelmírez, the central figure of the Historia, comes concretely into the narrative around 1093 when he is recorded as the secretary of Raymond of Burgundy. During this period, the see of Iria-Compostela did not have a bishop, and so in 1094 Gelmírez was made the temporary administrator of the church. He was given this position by the Galician nobility due to his father Gelmírio's good reputation as a steward. The Historia does not provide details about Gelmírez's early life, but does say he was a native of Galicia and came from a noble family. His father had been caretaker of some Church property in southern Galicia and was noted for his prudence.

Gelmírez's first prelature was short-lived. In 1095 the Cluniac monk Dalmacio was elected as the bishop. Dalmacio began to restore the church and attended the Council of Clermont, where an extension was granted to the church of Santiago. The 1095 extension officially moved the episcopal seat from Iria to Compostela, ending the two centuries of joint rule, and made Compostela exempt from a metropolitan. This meant that Compostela was under the jurisdiction of the Holy See rather than an archbishop, and was granted largely due to the tomb of St. James. Shortly after returning from Clermont, Dalmacio died, and Diego Gelmírez again became the administrator of the church.

In 1099 the pope gave permission for a new bishop to be elected, and in March of 1100 Gelmírez travelled to Rome to be ordained an archdeacon. He was elected as the second bishop of Compostela in July of that year, though he was not consecrated until Easter 1101 due to safety concerns amidst conflict with Aragón.
