= Ponce de Minerva =

Nobleman/general in 12th century Léon and Castile

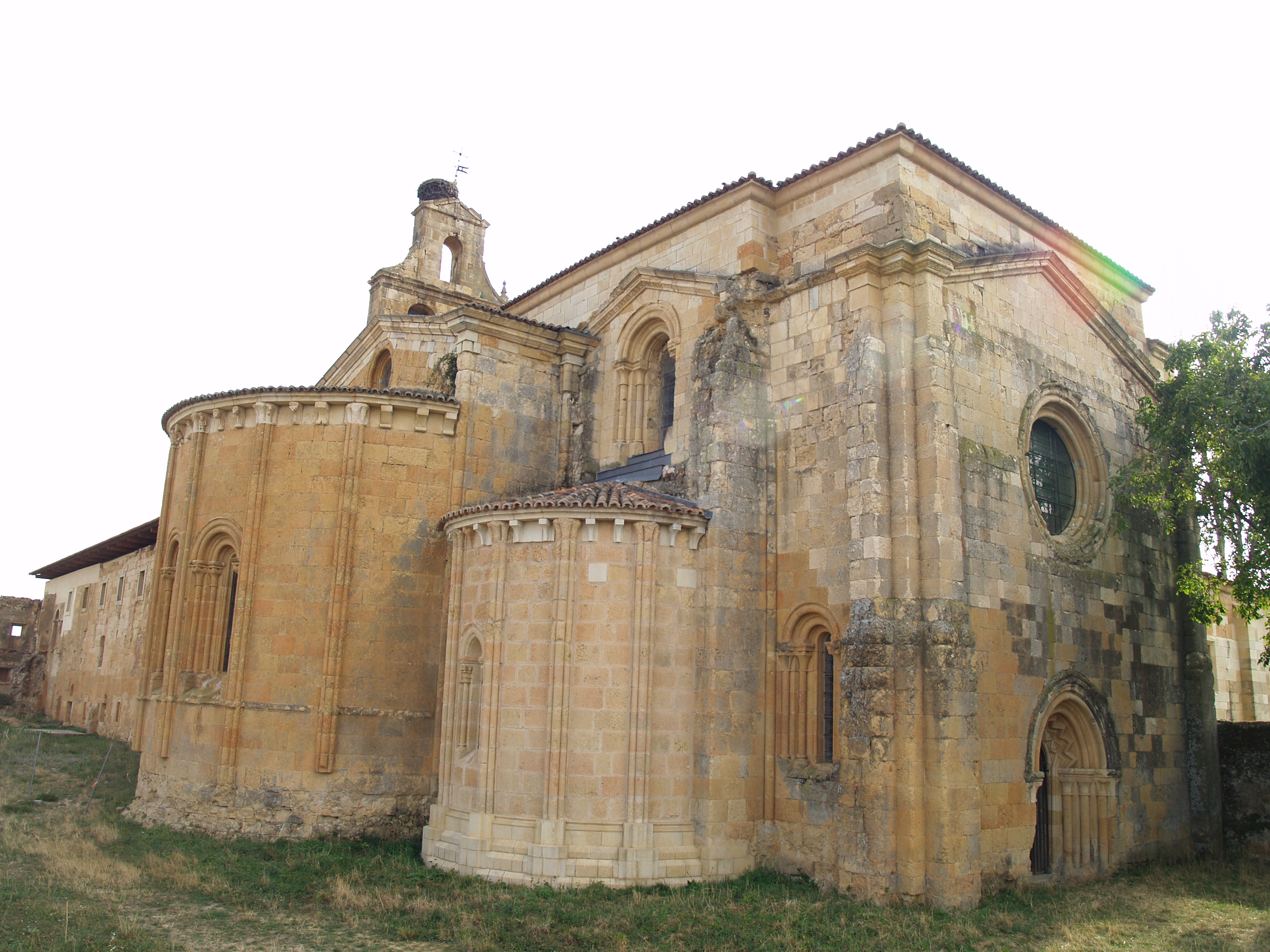
The monastery of Sandoval, founded by Ponce and his kin in 1167.

Ponce de Minerva (1114/1115 – 27 July 1175) was a nobleman, courtier, governor, and general serving, at different times, the kingdoms of León and Castile. Originally from Occitania, he came as a young man to León (1127), where he was raised probably in close connection to the royal family. His public career, first as a courtier and knight in the military retinue of Alfonso VII of León and Castile, began in 1140. By later historians he was implicated in the strife between Alfonso's successors, Sancho III of Castile and Ferdinand II of León, but he was generally loyal to the latter, although from 1168 to 1173 he was in voluntary exile serving Alfonso VIII of Castile.

Ponce had a long and distinguished military career. He participated in at least twelve campaigns, more than half of them campaigns of Reconquista fought against the Moors, but also campaigns against Navarre (1140), Portugal (1141), and Castile (1162 and 1163), as well as one famous campaign against some Castilian rebels, in which he was captured. He acquired landed wealth largely through royal preferment—even in the major cities of the realm, such as León and Toledo—and an advantageous marriage—his wife was a descendant of García Sánchez III of Navarre—and he rose to hold the highest rank in the kingdom, count, and the highest civil post, mayordomo mayor del rey (majordomo), in both Castile and León. In 1167 he founded a monastery, Santa María de Sandoval, and he was also a donor to the Order of Calatrava. In 1173 he re-populated half of the village of Azaña and granted it a fuero (charter of privileges).

== Move from Occitania to León ==
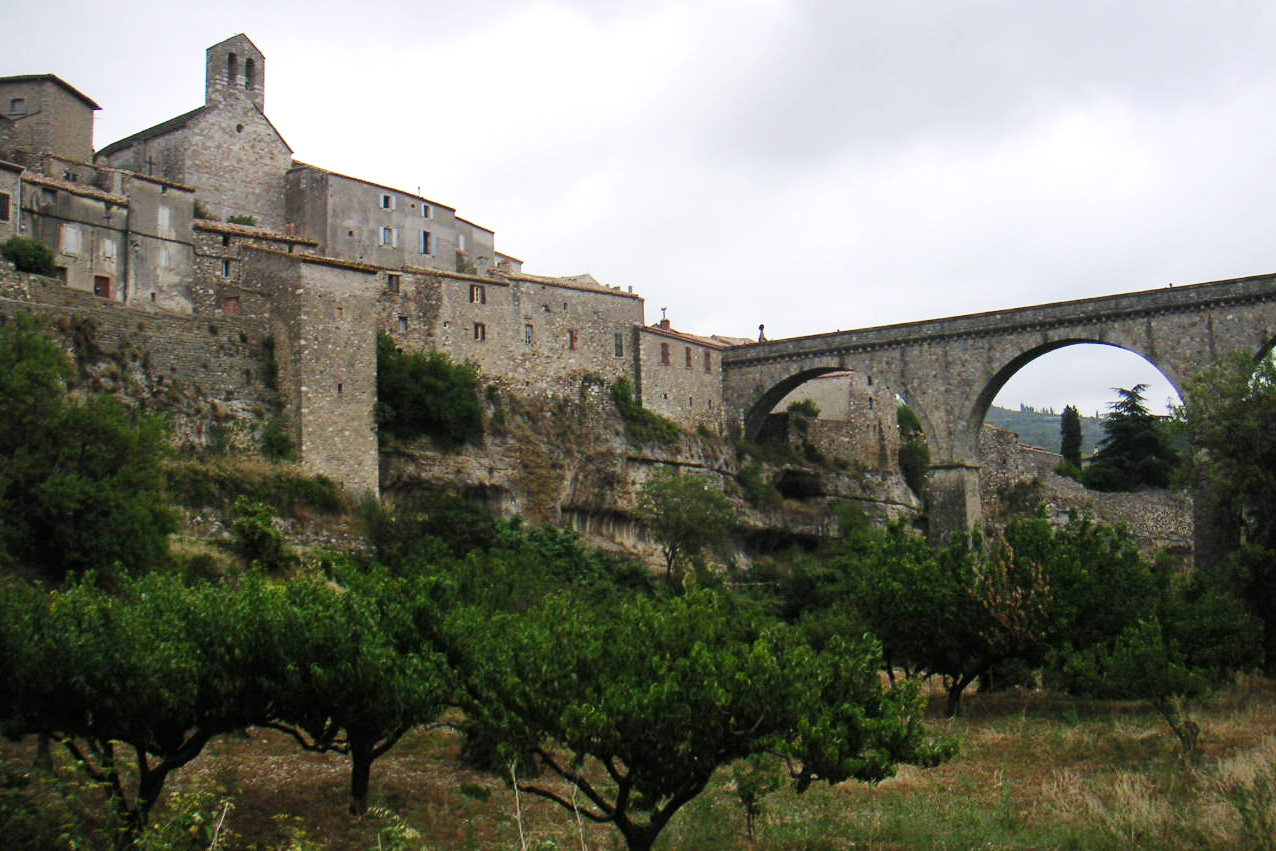
Minerve, in southern France

As his toponymic surname indicates, Ponce was from the Minervois ("de Minerva" is Latin for "from Minerve") in southern France, then a part of the County of Carcassonne, one of the possessions of Raymond Berengar III, Count of Barcelona. He may have been related to the Counts of Toulouse, but his genealogy has been disputed since the seventeenth century. The name of either of his parents is unknown. He arrived in León in November 1127 in the entourage of Berenguela of Barcelona, daughter of Raymond Berengar III, who wed Alfonso VII that month at Saldaña. He was probably a young man of about twelve years at the time. He may have been related to Raymond II, Bishop of Palencia (1148–83), who also hailed from Minerve and was also a protégé and perhaps a relative of Berenguela. It is likely that he was raised and educated for a time at the court of Alfonso VII's sister, the infanta Sancha Raimúndez.

Ponce does not appear in contemporary records until 1140, but his presence in the following of the Catalan princess is established by a charter in the archives of the convent of Santa María de Carrizo. This document, dated 13 March 1207, records a pesquisa (inquest) carried out by orders of Alfonso IX to determine what was owed by the village of Quintanilla to the convent in light of a donation made by Ponce. It mentions how Ponce had come to León with Berenguela:

When the lord emperor [Alfonso VII] brought [to León] his wife the empress, he also brought along the count Ponce de Minerva and married him to the countess Doña Estefanía, daughter of Count Ramiro, and gave him half of Carrizo, which was royal fiscal land (realengo), and he [Ponce] gave it to her as bridewealth. . . And the other half of Carrizo belonged to Count Ramiro, and he gave it to him [Ponce] with his daughter in marriage. . .

Because he hailed from an Occitan-speaking region ruled by the counts of Barcelona, he is often considered a Catalan. His name, in contemporary Latin, was Pontius or Poncius, transformed in Castilian to Ponce, the form used here, or Poncio, and also transformed into Ponç (Catalan) or Pons (Occitan).

== Marriage to Estefanía Ramírez ==
The record of the royal pesquisa of 1207 also notes how Ponce was subsequently betrothed to Estefanía Ramírez, daughter of Ramiro Fróilaz, and endowed by Alfonso VII with fiscal lands: half of the village of Carrizo de la Ribera and an estate at a place called Quiro, between Carrizo and Quintanilla. To this his future father-in-law added the other half of Carrizo, which had been a part of his patrimony. Carrizo included a palace (palacio), which was later given to the monastery there, and stood to the right of the "old gate" (portería vieja).

The charter provides no date for Ponce's betrothal or marriage, but a document dated 30 May 1140 records a grant given by the king's sister, Sancha Raimúndez, to Ponce on the occasion of his marriage: the village of Argavallones "at your marriage, because I nourished [i.e., raised] you". This document survives only in a copy from 1716 that has clearly been altered. For instance, it anachronistically cites Martin as Archbishop of Santiago de Compostela even though he was not consecrated until 1156. Of Ponce de Minerva it says:

The Count exchanged this mortal life in order to enjoy the prize of his heroic works, as was said, in the year 1212 of the Era, leaving finished the monastery of Sandoval and the greater chapel of the church, with the rest being finished after his days by Don Diego Martínez de Villamayor, his son-in-law and a benefactor of that house, where he was buried.

The charter is accepted as genuine by some, and as having some basis in fact by others. Ponce was very young at the time of his arrival in León is probable in light of the contours of his subsequent career. His first appearance in a court document dates to 9 September 1140, when he witnessed an act of Alfonso VII's as alférez, that is, armiger and standard-bearer of the royal mesnada (military retinue). This office was usually reserved for the scions of noble houses and other young and aspiring aristocrats. At the time of his advent in León in 1127 he would therefore have been placed in an aristocratic household capable of raising him, and the king's sister is known to have raised at least one other young nobleperson in her court: Urraca Rodríguez, daughter of Rodrigo González de Lara, whom she remembered in her (undated) will as "Urraca, daughter of Count Rodrigo, whom I raised". Likewise, the village of Argavallones must have been acquired by Ponce sometime before his marriage, since he gave it to his bride as her arras (bridewealth), along with all his lands at Carrizo, San Pedro del Páramo (modern San Pedro de las Dueñas), and Grulleros (Grulerius). According to a document in the Tumbo Antiguo cartulary of Carrizo, Argavallones was located near Grulleros, just west of Villaverde de Sandoval (Sot noval). It may be supposed that the forged eighteenth-century charter was designed to replace an authentic lost charter. This document aside, the earliest reference to Ponce's marriage to Estefanía is from 13 February 1146, when Alfonso VII rewarded them with a grant of land at Villamoros de Mansilla "for the service to me which you [plural] have done and are doing".

== Alférez of Alfonso VII ==
From the time of his appointment as alférez sometime between 26 June and 9 September 1140 until his replacement sometime after 19 December 1144 and before March 1145, Ponce de Minerva was a constant presence at the royal court and on all of Alfonso VII's military campaigns. He took part in the expedition against García Ramírez of Navarre in 1140 and that against Portugal in 1141. He definitely participated in the Siege of Coria in 1142, as recorded in the Tumbo Negro, cartulary of the Cathedral of Zamora, and he probably also accompanied the royal forces on a razzia of the environs of Córdoba and Granada in 1144. This last (obscure) campaign is mentioned in a charter issued at Toledo in November 1144 "as the emperor arrived from the fortification that he had made against Córdoba and Granada".

Ponce's rewards for these various services were extensive. There are two false documents dated to 25 January and 14 June 1141 which purport to record royal donations to Ponce. The first is the donation of Quiro, which occurred on the occasion of his betrothal according to the account of the pesquisa of 1207. The second is the donation of San Pedro del Páramo, which it is known that Ponce gave to his wife as part of her bridewealth. The above charters are classified as spurious because they name Alfonso VII as ruling in Baeza and Almería, places he did not conquer until 1147, and they list Martin, Archbishop of Santiago, as confirming. They nevertheless contain a kernel of truth. More securely datable is Alfonso's grant to Ponce the village of Villaverde de Sandoval, on the bank of the Porma near the possessions which he had given his wife at their marriage, in 1142.

== Acquisition of governorships ==
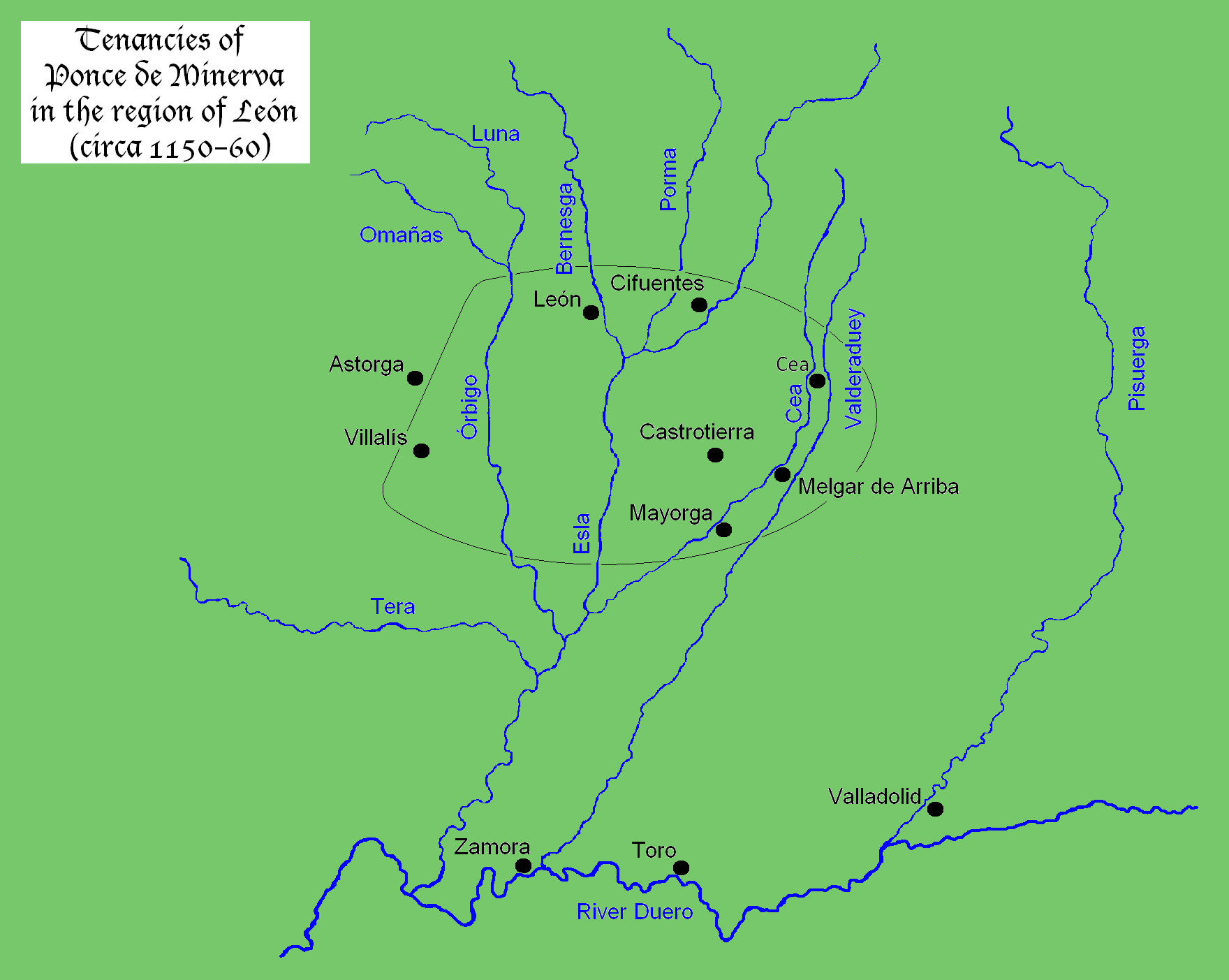
Ponce's zone of influence was in the immediate vicinity of León, which he held from the crown between 1148 and 1168. He also governed Mayorga (by 1144), Villalís (by 1150), Castrotierra (by 1152), and Melgar de Arriba (by 1161). He had properties at Astorga, Cifuentes, and Toro.

A change in Ponce's career began with his long absences from court in 1145, after he had left the post of alférez. He only attended the court on a few occasions in 1144, and by that year he had received the tenancy (tenencia) of Mayorga to govern. There is no reference in any surviving royal charter to Ponce's rule in Mayorga, rather it is cited in no less than fifteen private charters dated between 23 January 1144 and 3 May 1157. By 1148 he had also received the government of the royal city (urbs regia) of León. Specifically this tenancy, called the "towers of León" (turres Legionis), consisted in the fortified royal citadel ("fortress-palace") that guarded the northern gate of the city. There are ten royal documents from the reign of Alfonso VII that show Ponce holding this "most sensitive post". Both of these tenancies had previously been held by Osorio Martínez, who had been disgraced sometime in the first half of 1142. Despite his greater responsibility in the kingdom that kept him away from court, Ponce continued to take part in all of Alfonso VII's major military actions.

In 1147, which has been described as an annus mirabilis for the Iberian Christians because of Alfonso VII's summer campaign, Ponce was with the royal army at Calatrava the week of 4–9 June. He was still with the royal forces at Andújar, witnessing a royal charter issued on 17 July, but it is not clear if he participated in the successful sieges of Baeza and Almería later that summer. There is no contemporary record of his presence with the royal army after Andújar, On 18 November 1153, Alfonso VII granted "to my faithful vassal [Ponce,] for the good and faithful service which you did me in Almería and in many other places in both the Christian and Muslim regions", the castle of Albuher near Villamanrique de Tajo. According to Manuel Recuero Astray, the recipient was Ponce de Minerva, but more likely it was his namesake Count Ponce de Cabrera. Another twentieth-century historian mistakenly believed that the "Count Ponce" of the Prefatio de Almaria, a poetic retelling of the conquest of Almería in 1147, was Ponce de Minerva.

In 1150, Ponce probably took part in the failed siege of Córdoba, since he was with the king at Jaén immediately after the siege was lifted. By that year he had received the tenancy of Villalís. The following year, on 30 January 1151, at Calahorra, Alfonso awarded Ponce, called "our faithful vassal", with the village of Grulleros, which he later gave to his wife. Later that year, according to documents in the cathedral archives of Santa María de León, he was at the siege of Jaén and the second siege of Baeza, which had been lost again. In 1152, he took part in the assault on Guadix. On 18 December that year he was one of the select magnates whom Alfonso took counsel with before modifying the fueros of Sahagún.

During this time he was rewarded further, first with a castle on the Tagus. The original document recording this grant, issued at Soria on 18 November 1153, has survived, and is one of possibly ten charters of Alfonso VII to have been authenticated with a seal. At the same time, Ponce was rewarded with further governorships: Cea by 1152, Castrotierra by 1153, and Gatón de Campos by 1155. His territorial lordships, however, were generally scattered, although they were all in the province of León and relatively near to the city itself, whose government he continued to hold throughout the period. The lordship of Cea was shared with Ermengol VI of Urgell, according to a private charter of 23 June 1152. Another charter of 27 March 1150 shows Ermengol sharing it with Lope López, suggesting that Ponce was Lope's replacement. In 1155, Ponce was with Alfonso for the capture of Andújar. The last reference to Ponce holding Cea, site of a royal castle, dates from 28 June 1156.

== Controversies of 1157–58 ==
Under Alfonso VII Ponce was "a curial personage of stature" who "enjoyed the fullest confidence of the crown", yet despite his residence at court "he was of secondary rank" and generally his confirmation of royal acts was not sought. Of the six hundred royal charters surviving from Alfonso's reign after 1140, Ponce confirmed only 141 of them. After the death of Alfonso VII on 21 August 1157, the kingdoms of León and Castile were separated. The former, where Ponce's tenancies were located, went to Alfonso's second son, Ferdinand II. The latter, where Ponce possessed some lands on the river Tagus in the regnum of Toledo, passed to his eldest son, Sancho III. Ponce initially gravitated to the court of Ferdinand II, where he was present from at least 9 October 1157. On this date, Ferdinand issued the earliest of his surviving charters, by which he granted some estates to Rodrigo Pérez de Traba, who in turn donated the village of Gomariz to the monastery of Toxosoutos in Galicia. This charter shows that Ferdinand had brought together most of the leading magnates of León in the first months of his reign; even the King of Portugal, Afonso I Henriques, was present. On 13 October the court had moved to Villalpando, where the king rewarded his follower Velasco Menéndez. Ponce was still in attendance. Villalpando was at one time governed by Ponce.

According to the thirteenth-century Toledan historian Rodrigo Jiménez de Rada, in his De rebus Hispaniae, Ferdinand came to believe certain false rumours about Ponce de Minerva spread by his enemies at court. In response he confiscated Ponce's fiefs, and those of some other noblemen, and sent them into exile. They went to the court of Sancho III seeking redress, whereupon Sancho marched an army into León. The two kings met at Sahagún, where, according to Rodrigo, Sancho said to his brother:

Since our father divided the kingdom between us, both you and I are held to share the land and its produce with our magnates, with whose help our forefathers possessed the lost land and repulsed the Arabs. Therefore, as the other magnates, whom you deprived, have returned their fiefs to count Ponce de Minerva, and you would not believe the rumours against them, I am returning behind my borders.

This account, however, is based on a confusion between Ponce de Minerva and Ponce de Cabrera. There is some confusion even among modern historians between these two Ponces. Derek Lomax notes that "the personalities, relationships and activities of these minor Catalan nobles are difficult to disentangle, but it is clear that they were extremely active in the politics of central Spain throughout the twelfth century, and that they built up their lordships primarily in the region of Salamanca and Valladolid." The first modern historian to differentiate the two Ponces was the Marqués de Mondéjar (died 1708), who believed them to be closely related.

There is abundant contemporary documentary evidence of Ponce de Cabrera's exile to Castile, while Ponce de Minerva clearly remained on good terms with Ferdinand II throughout 1158. He was with the court at Faro in Galicia on 15 February. In March, the court was at Malgrado, where Ferdinand II rewarded Ponce with some lands between Siero and Carande. On 23 May Ponce was present for the ratification of the Treaty of Sahagún, for which he stood as a surety for Ferdinand II, along with his father-in-law, a certain Abril, and Pedro Alfonso. The Treaty stipulated that certain lands conquered by Sancho from his brother in the recent conflict were to be returned and held in fealty (in fidelitate) from Ferdinand. The treaty named three vassals among whom these lands could be distributed: Ponce de Minerva, Ponce de Cabrera, and Osorio Martínez. To the end of the surviving record of the treaty is appended a list of those who "swore on the side of King Ferdinand", and Ponce is listed among them. Contrary to the Toledan historian's confused account, Ponce de Minerva was unswervingly loyal to Ferdinand II during the lifetime of Sancho III, although the presence of his name alongside the grieved Ponce de Cabrera and Osorio has raised suspicions. On 1 July he and the newly reconciled Ponce de Cabrera confirmed Ferdinand's grant to Rodrigo Sebastiánez, a monk of Oviedo.

== Counsellor of Ferdinand II ==
Ponce de Minerva was throughout this period one of Ferdinand's most trusted advisors and a major recipient of his largesse. In 1159, he was among those who accompanied Ferdinand II into Galicia when he made peace with the Portuguese. On 14 June, while the court was staying at Sahagún, he and his wife were rewarded "for good service" (pro bono servitio) with a grant of land at Santa María del Páramo in the vicinity of León. By this month he had also been trusted with the lordship of Valderas, and by 1161 he was governing Melgar de Arriba (or de Suso) as well. On 15 March 1161, while the court was at Malgrado, Ferdinand again rewarded Ponce with an estate at Ferreras near León, but this time also with lands at Salio in the Picos de Europa. On 28 March, Ponce de Cabrera was ruling "under his imperium [i.e. Ferdinand's regalian rights] in Melgar [i.e. Melgar de Abajo (or de Yuso)] and Ponce de Minerva in the other Melgar". In 1162, Ponce de Minerva took part in Ferdinand's expedition into Castile, where he captured Toledo. In 1163, he was again with the royal Leonese army that invaded Castile.

Ponce's frequent presence at court necessitated the devolution of government in his tenancies to subordinates. Thus, in 1162, one "Juan Martínez, under the hand of the lord Ponce de Minerva, [was] holding the towers of León". By 1164 Juan was holding León without any indication of Ponce's superiority. In 1164, Ponce was granted an estate at Villamañán, according to the Tumbo Antiguo (old cartulary) of Santa María de Carrizo. In September of the latter year, during the court's sojourn at Villaquejida, Ferdinand also awarded him property at Villamandos in the valley of the Esla, where he possessed other estates. Also in 1164, Ponce's governorship was extended over Riaño and two places called Ceón and Buraun. By 23 October he had been promoted to the rank of count (comes or consul in Latin), the highest title in the kingdom after the king's. This promotion constituted a recognition that Ponce was one of the leading magnates of the kingdom, and one of the most powerful. This promotion did not take place until after the death of Count Ponce de Cabrera (1162/63). By 27 October 1164 Ponce de Minerva had been deprived of the government of the city of León. He was still without it on 6 May 1166, but by 11 November he had regained control of it.

In 1165, for a second time Ponce was with Ferdinand in Galicia to make peace with Portugal, and he was given the tenancy of Coyanza, modern Valencia de Don Juan. In 1167, he was rewarded with the tenancy of Castroverde de Campos, as recorded in the archives of the hospital of San Marcos de León. On 16 February he and his family founded the monastery of Santa María de Sandoval at Villaverde, which had been granted him by Alfonso VII in 1142. Sometime before 15 July 1167, Ferdinand II appointed him majordomo (maiordomus), the highest office associated with the royal court and the pre-eminent position in the realm: he had reached "the zenith of his power in León" and was "one of the most powerful lay figures of the realm". His eldest son, Ramiro Ponce, also served Ferdinand II as alférez in the 1160s.

== Fall from favour and exile ==
At some point in 1168, for reasons unknown, Ponce went into exile in Castile. In the summer of 1167, Count Ermengol VII of Urgell and his mesnada (knightly retinue) had arrived in the service of Ferdinand II, whom he had assisted in the capture of the fortress of Alcántara from the Almohads, which fortress Ferdinand granted to him as a fief on 21 November, as recorded in the archives of the Order of Santiago that Ferdinand had founded. By that date, Ferdinand had already removed Ponce from his post as majordomo and replaced him with Ermengol. The arrival of Ermengol thus appears to have marked a shift in the king's favour from the one Catalan to the other. Ponce continued with the Leonese court from sometime after his dismissal as majordomo: he was present at León, still his tenancy, on 11 December, and in 1168 he was present at Castro Mazamud on 10 January and at Lugo on 4 March.

Ponce's last appearance in any surviving document from León for this period is dated 9 April 1168, which is also the last royal document confirmed by his son Ramiro, who appears to have entered an exile from court at the same time as his father. By 20 September the tenancies of León and Mayorga had passed to Fernando Rodríguez de Castro, an exile from Castile. Owing to ignorance of the exact chronology of Ponce's defection, it is unclear whether his replacement as majordomo by Ermengol and his replacement in the fiefs of León and Mayorga by Fernando were a consequence or an incitement.

== Service to the Crown in Castile ==
Ponce, following his fall from favour, went to the court of Alfonso VIII of Castile, son of Sancho III, which had moved to the fortress of Abia possibly to receive the defecting count. The court was at Sahagún on 29 August when Ponce first makes an appearance there in the surviving records. In April 1169 he played a leading role in the siege of the town of Zorita de los Canes, which was being held by the relatives and supporters of Fernando Rodríguez de Castro against Alfonso VIII. He joined with Nuño Pérez de Lara in the initial attack, which was a failure. Later, Ponce and Nuño went to negotiate with the castellan, Lope de Arenas, but were betrayed and arrested. There is a private document from 25 April by which these events are dated, for it was redacted "at the time when Count Nuño and Count Ponce were defeated at Zorita". Alfonso VIII continued to besiege the town in which his two generals were being held until at least 14 May, when a royal charter of donation was drawn up "about (i.e., around) Zorita, at that time when Count Nuño and Count Ponce were being held captive there by the most evil Lope de Arenas". The donation was made to the military Order of Calatrava founded by his father. By 19 May, Zorita had surrendered and the two captives been freed. A royal charter issued that day "was made in Zorita, at the time when Count Nuño and Count Ponce were liberated from captivity there". These last two charters indicate the part likely played by the knights of Calatrava in the capture of Zorita and the liberation of Ponce de Minerva, and it is probably therefore in gratefulness that Ponce soon after gaining his freedom made over to the Order some mills he owned in Toledo.

Ponce's service to the Crown in the Castile lasted five years. At the time of his arrival, and even during the siege of Zorita, Alfonso VIII was a minor whose regency was held by Nuño Pérez. By the fall, however, he had come of age and begun to rule in his own right. Shortly after, on 11 November, Ponce was with his court at Burgos. In September 1170, Ponce attended the wedding festivities of Alfonso VIII and Eleanor, daughter of Henry II of England and Eleanor of Aquitaine. According to a document in the church archives, on 23 June 1171 Ponce divided the village of Azaña (modern Numancia de la Sagra) between himself and the canons of the cathedral of Santa María de Toledo.

Ponce's support for the young king was rewarded with several lordships in western Castile, along the border with León. From 1170 he was ruling Saldaña, the town to which he had first come for the marriage of Berenguela and Alfonso VII some forty-three years prior. From 1171 he ruled Carrión, a town associated with his allies of the Lara family, also mutual rivals of the Castros. By 1172 he was governing the tenancy of Boadilla de Rioseco, and by 10 May that year he had been raised to the post of majordomo of the royal household. This was probably in an effort by the king to relieve himself of some of the influence of the overbearing former regent Nuño. The last record of Ponce in that office dates to 28 June 1173, and shortly thereafter he was reconciled to Ferdinand II.

== Fuero of Azaña ==
In September 1173 Ponce was still in Castile when he granted some land at Azaña to some settlers: "In the name of God and his grace, I, Count Ponce, give to the settlers that half of Azaña that fell to me". The "charter of rights and obligations" (called a fuero) that he gave to the settlers exists as a thirteenth-century copy in a cartulary of the cathedral of Toledo. Ponce kept a few fields—two sernas and two prados—for himself (demesne), but the rest of the land he rented out to twenty-five settlers. Each received a field (yugada), some additional land for planting vines and orchards, and eight cahices of seed for wheat. The fuero requires that any settler who wished to sell his property and leave the area had to give Ponce the first option to buy, even if he was away on campaign in the south, in which case the would-be seller had to await his return. Another clause gives an indication of his reconciliation with the King of León, for it states that if Ponce was away in the north, either "in the kingdom of Alfonso or in the kingdom of Ferdinand", then the would-be seller had to notify Ponce's majordomo of his intention to sell and wait forty days for Ponce to exercise his option to buy, after which the settler could sell the land to anyone.

The majordomo referred to in the surviving fuero may have been "a local estate manager rather than the count's household official". This person was also in charge of organising the annual boon work of the settlers and was responsible for supplying them with food and drink during that period. This boon work consisted in three operationes, as they are called in the surviving charter: two for sowing and one for either threshing or ploughing in Ponce's fields. The tenants also owed Ponce tribute or rent in the form of one cahiz each of wheat and barley per field and portions of the produce of their vineyards and orchards. They also owed yantar (hospitality). The fuero of Azaña contains one of the best surviving descriptions of this practice from the twelfth century, and it also indicates Ponce's expectation of continued itinerancy between his various properties and tenancies. The settlers were required each year to prepare a feast for him or his wife and their retinues, although their sons, daughters, or grandchildren could be sent in their place. The amount of produce to be used for these feasts is specified: three rams, one pig, twelve hens, 160 loaves of bread, and large quantities of barley and wine. If none of Ponce's kin attended in a given year, the settlers were exempted from the tribute, which is what the meal was taken to be. Ponce has been described as an "absentee landlord with a vengeance", although no different from his fellow twelfth-century European aristocrats.

== Itinerancy in Castile and León ==
Sometime in the first half of 1173, Ermengol VII left the service of Ferdinand II, for reasons unknown. His absence may have opened up the possibility of reconciliation to Ponce de Minerva, who had returned to the city of León by October, when he rejoined the court after five years of voluntary exile. The remainder of his life was characterised by intinerancy between the courts of León and Castile and between his possessions and governorships in the two kingdoms.

In February 1174, Ponce was with the court of Alfonso VIII at Toledo for a major gathering the kingdom's leading men. In June, he and Estefanía visited the Benedictine monastery at Sahagún, in Castile near the border with León, where they donated an estate at Villalba de la Loma (part of the tenancy of Mayorga) in exchange for the Hospital de Don García. By October he had joined the court of Ferdinand II at Ciudad Rodrigo, where the king officially declared their reconciliation by granting "to you, my beloved Count Ponce, and your wife, the countess Doña Estefanía" a privilege exempting the couple from taxes on all their lands and exempting all their vassals from taxes also. On 18 November, Ponce met Alfonso VIII at Fuentedueña, perhaps remaining with the court until 9 May 1175, when he was definitely in attendance at Medina del Campo. The last records of Ponce alive date from June, when he was in León.

== Death and legacy ==
Ponce died on 27 July, according to the tablas de aniversarios (a calendar of annual commemorations) of the nunnery of Carrizo. That the year was 1175 is obvious from his sudden disappearance from contemporary documentation after June of that year. He was buried in Sandoval. In the archives of the monastery of Benevívere are two charters both dated 30 July, only a few days after Count Ponce's death, which record the donation received from his widow and children of lands at Quintanilla and Mayorga (in the first transaction) and lands at Santamarina and Lerones with the Hospital de Don García (in the second transaction) for the redemption of Ponce's soul.

On 17 February 1176, Countess Estefanía granted her land at Benavides to the monastery of Sobrado dos Monxes in Galicia "for the soul of the count Don Ponce" and that a monastery might be built there. On 10 September 1176, she founded a convent "for the soul of my husband, the lord count Ponce", at Carrizo, including in her donation the palace they had owned there. She dedicated it to the Virgin and placed it under the Cistercian Order. The archives of this convent, Santa María de Carrizo, are an important source for the lives and careers of Ponce and his wife. They contain the authentic charter of foundation of Estefanía, wherein she describes her gift to the monastery of the lands comprising her bridewealth from Ponce:

I give and concede the village that is called Carrizo, with all its environs and attached territories, integral; and the village of San Pedro del Páramo, whole and integral, and the village of Grulleros and Argavallones, and its environs and attached territories that belong to me; which villages I have from my acquisitions and my bridewealth and my scattered estates, which my husband gave to me.

Estefanía died in 1183 or 1184 and was buried beside her husband.

Ponce acquired a vast wealth in lands after his migration to León. His principal estates all lay within fifty kilometres of the urbs regia of León, which he himself governed from 1148 to 1165 and again from 1167 to 1168. He had many estates in the valleys of the rivers Esla, Porma, Órbigo, and Bernesga. Besides properties he received from Alfonso VII and Ferdinand II, which was a total of ten donations between 1148 and 1174, Ponce and Estefanía acquired lands at Mayorga on the Esla, and at Quintanilla and Villalba de Loma on the Porma.

== Children ==
Family tree showing Ponce's relationship, through his wife, to the royal house of Navarre, and the marriages and descendants of his children.

Of Ponce's children, Ramiro was his primary heir, even claiming, without any apparent royal approval, his father's title of count, but he never returned to favour in León. Ponce's daughters, Sancha and María, usually surnamed Ponce as a patronymic (from the Latin Poncii or Pontii), married Pedro Garcés de Lerma, a Castilian, and Rodrigo Álvarez, a Galician, respectively; both were wealthy and powerful men. Sancha, by Pedro, had a son, Gonzalo Pérez, who became the abbot of Husillos in Castile.

Ponce's younger daughter, María, separated from her husband by mutual agreement since late 1173 or early 1174, when he founded the Order of Mountjoy, was installed as the first abbess of her mother's foundation at Carrizo in 1184, a position she held until her death in 1191. She inherited an estate at Astorga, and there is preserved a conuenientia (pact) between her and the tenants of her estate there in the archives of Carrizo. The pact stipulates that annually on Martinmas (11 November) the inhabitants should pay a rent of two solidi and a portion of produce for every parcel of land they owned. The document lists twenty-three peasant farmers and their land tenures, totalling eighty-eight solidi in cash per annum for the abbess.

On 26 February 1189, according to a document of Santa María de Sandoval, Ponce's daughters, Sancha and María, got together to divide their inheritance, which included properties in the city of León and at Oret, Ferreras, Corbillos, Molina Seca, Villarroañe, Villanueva, Matadeón, Cifuentes, and Maraña, all in the region around the city. They had also received lands in Toledo and Azaña in Castile, and at Toro on the river Duero in León's far west. They accomplished the division by drawing lots to avoid sharp disagreements.

== Bibliography ==
- Barton, Simon F. (1992). "Two Catalan Magnates in the Courts of the Kings of León-Castile: The Careers of Ponce de Cabrera and Ponce de Minerva Re-Examined". Journal of Medieval History. 18 (3): 233–66. doi:10.1016/0304-4181(92)90022-q.
- Barton, Simon F. (1996). "The Count, the Bishop and the Abbot: Armengol VI of Urgel and the Abbey of Valladolid". English Historical Review. 111 (440): 85–103. doi:10.1093/ehr/cxi.440.85.
- Barton, Simon F. (1997). The Aristocracy in Twelfth-century León and Castile. Cambridge: Cambridge University Press.
- Canal Sánchez-Pagín, José María (1984). "Don Pedro Fernández, primer maestre de la Orden Militar de Santiago: su familia, su vida". Anuario de Estudios Medievales. 14: 33–71.
- Canal Sánchez-Pagín, José María (1989). "Casamientos de los condes de Urgel en Castilla". Anuario de Estudios Medievales. 19: 119–35.
- Fernández, Luis (1962). "La abadía de Santa María de Benevívere en la Edad Media: su historia, la regla". Miscelánea Comillas: Revista de Ciencias Humanas y Sociales. 20 (37): 5–254.
- Fernández-Xesta y Vázquez, Ernesto (1991). Un magnate catalán en la corte de Alfonso VII: Comes Poncius de Cabreira, princeps Çemore. Madrid: Iberoamericanas.
- Fletcher, Richard A. (1976). "Diplomatic and the Cid Revisited: The Seals and Mandates of Alfonso VII". Journal of Medieval History. 2 (4): 305–438. doi:10.1016/0304-4181(76)90028-2.
- Lomax, Derek W. (1982). "Catalans in the Leonese Empire". Bulletin of Hispanic Studies. 59 (3): 191–97. doi:10.1080/1475382822000359191.
- Luengo, José María (1944). "Monasterio de Santa María de Carrizo (León)". Archivo español de arte. 17 (63): 171–78.
- Montenegro Valentín, Julia (1999). "Merinos y tenentes en el territorivm legionense: una aportación al estudio de la organización territorial de los reinos occidentales" (PDF). Anales de la Universidad de Alicante. Historia Medieval. 12 (12): 153–69. doi:10.14198/medieval.1999.12.07.
- Pascua Echegaray, Esther (1989). "Hacia la formación política de la monarquía medieval: las relaciones entre la monarquía y la Iglesia castellanoleonesa en el reinado de Alfonso VII". Hispania. 49 (172): 397–441.
- Recuero Astray, Manuel (1986). "Donaciones de Alfonso VII a sus fieles y servidores". En la España Medieval. 9: 897–914.
- Reilly, Bernard F. (1998). The Kingdom of León-Castilla under King Alfonso VII, 1126–1157. Philadelphia: University of Pennsylvania Press.
- Sánchez de Mora, Antonio (2003). La nobleza castellana en la plena Edad Media: el linaje de Lara (SS. XI–XIII) (Doctoral). University of Seville.
- Serrano, Luciano (1927). Cartulario del Monasterio de Vega, con documentos de San Pelayo y Vega de Oviedo. Madrid: Junta para la Ampliación de Estudios e Investigaciones Científicas, Centro de Estudios Históricos.
