= Estefanía Ramírez (noblewoman) =

Spanish noblewoman

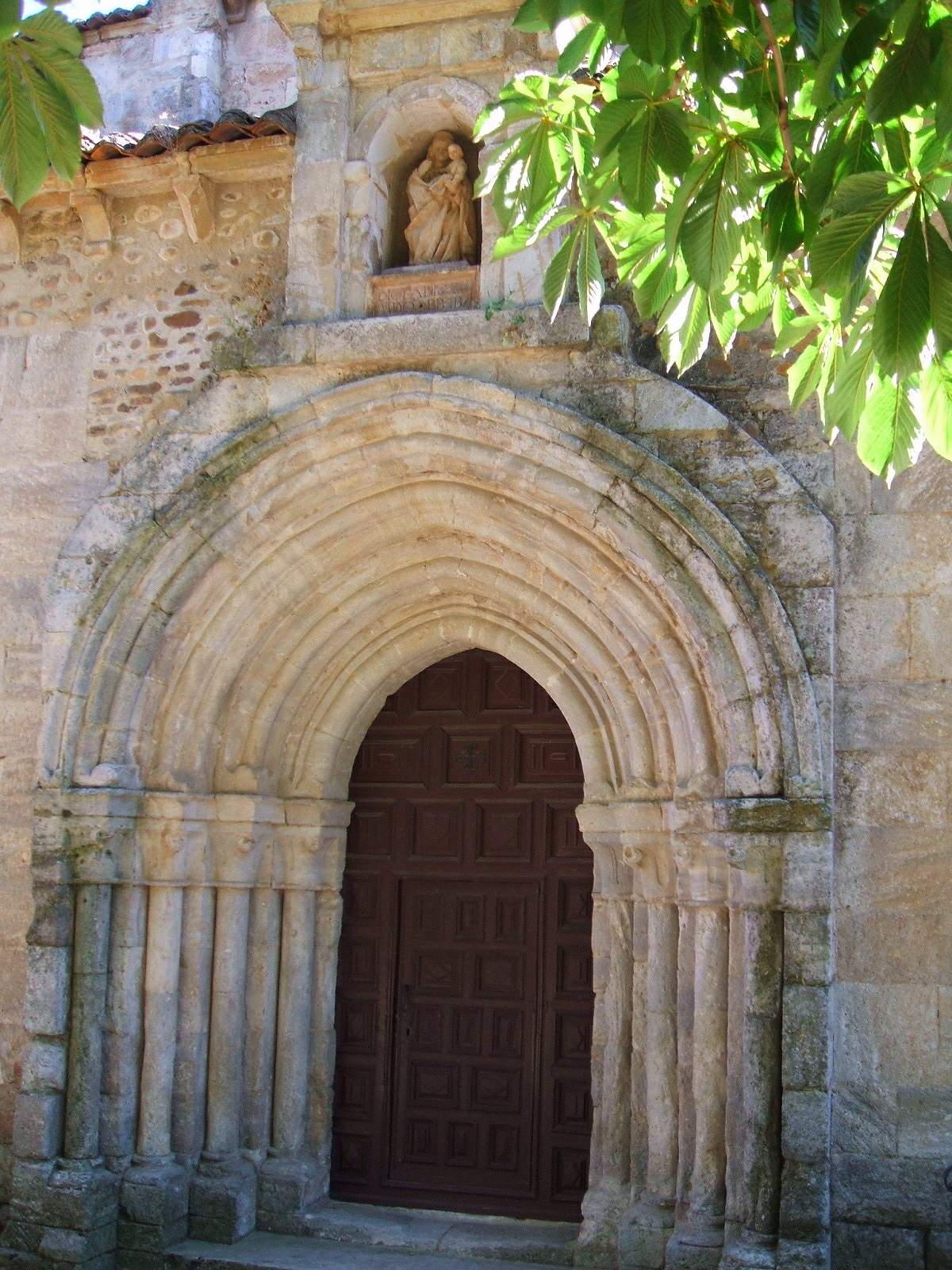
Poortico of the church at the Monasterery of Santa María de Carrizo

Estefanía Ramírez (died 1183), daughter of Count Ramiro Fróilaz, was the wife of Count Ponce de Minerva. Both founded the Monastery of Santa María de Sandoval in Mansilla Mayor and, as a widow, she founded, firstly, the monastery of Santa María de Benavides in Boadilla de Rioseco, and later the monastery of Santa María de Carrizo in Carrizo de la Ribera where she retired with her daughter María who became its first abbess.

== Family origins and marriage ==
Her father, Ramiro Fróilaz, married three or four times. Although the name of Estefanía's mother is not confirmed, she was probably the daughter of Sancha Rodríguez since, following the onomastic traditions at that time, one of her daughters was also named Sancha. Estefanía was named after her paternal grandmother, Countess Estefanía Sánchez, a member of the royal house of Navarre, who was the wife of Count Fruela Díaz, a descendant of Count Flaín Muñoz and a member of the House of Cea.

Her marriage with Count Ponce de Minerva probably took place in 1140 when infanta Sancha Raimúndez, who was responsible for the education of the young Ponce when he arrived in the Kingdom of León, on 30 January of that year gave the couple Argavallones, a villa which was part of the infantado of León, as a wedding gift. Her father gave her half of Carrizo and her husband the other half that he had received from the Emperor Alfonso VII of León which was to be given to his bride as part of her arras. Four children were born of this marriage: Fernando; Ramiro; María; y Sancha Ponce. Her husband in his will left her all of his dominions.

== Foundations and donations ==
On 15 February 1167, the countess and her husband, accompanied by their children Ramiro, María and Sancha, founded the Cistercian Monastery of Santa Maria de Sandoval.

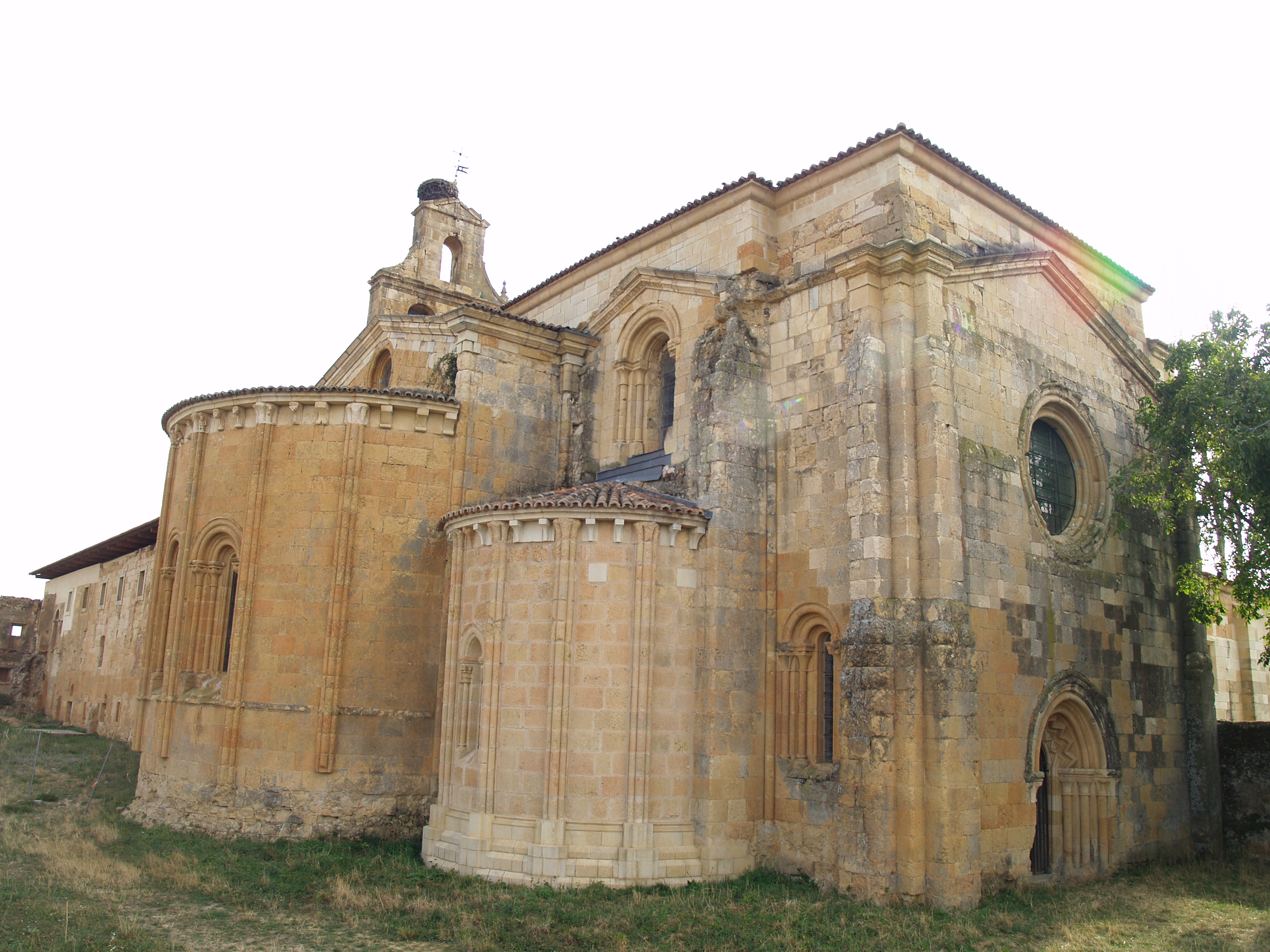
Abses of the Monastery of Sandoval

As a widow, on 30 July 1175, Estefanía and her children donated their estates in Quintanilla and Mayorga to the Abbey of Santa María de Benevívere and on the same day, in another transaction, gave this abbey their properties in Santa María de Lerones, near Saldaña, in addition to Hospital de Don García, for the soul of her deceased husband.

In 1176, Estefanía founded the Royal Monastery of Santa María de Benavides in Boadilla de Rioseco which had previously been situated in a place named Valverde. She donated the territory to the Monasterio de Santa María de Sobrado, of which the new monastery was to be an affiliate. King Alfonso VIII of Castile in 1176 donated an estate in Benavides where the monks, previously living in Valverde, settled.

On 10 September 1176, Estefanía donated the places she owned in Carrizo, San Pedro del Páramo, Grulleros, Argavallones, her property in Astorga, Riegos (Villaviciosa de la Ribera) and Tapia for the foundation of the new monastery called Santa María de Carrizo, a donation made pro anima mariti mei comitis domni Poncii (for the soul of my husband, Don Ponce). In the document, she indicated that if the place was not acceptable to the Cistercian Order, her daughter Maria was to decide to which religious order the new monastery was to be given.

Countess Estefanía retired to this monastery accompanied by her daughter María who became its first abbess. She did not become a nun but governed the monastery as its lady, a frequent custom among the families who founded and promoted monasteries. She lived there until her death in 1183. She and her husband Count Ponce de Minerva were both buried at the Monastery of Sandoval which they had founded.

== Bibliography ==
- Alonso Álvarez, Raquel (2007). "Los promotores de la Orden del Císter en los reinos de Castilla y León: Familias aristocráticas y damas nobles". Anuario de Estudios Medievales (in Spanish). 37 (37/2): 653–710. doi:10.3989/aem.2007.v37.i2.50. hdl:10651/21710. ISSN 0066-5061.
- Barton, Simon (1992). "Two Catalan magnates in the courts of the kings of León-Castile: the careers of Ponce de Cabrera and Ponce de Minerva re-examined". Journal of Medieval History. 18 (18): 233–266. doi:10.1016/0304-4181(92)90022-Q.
- Calderón Medina, Inés (2008). "Las fundaciones cistercienses de Estefanía Ramírez". Actas III Simposio Internacional de Jóvenes Medievalistas, Lorca 2006 (PDF) (in Spanish). Universidad de Murcia, Sociedad Española de Estudios Medievales, Ayuntamiento de Lorca, et al. pp. 27–40. ISBN 978-84-8371-646-5.
- Casado Lobato, Mª Concepción (1983). Colección Diplomática del Monasterio de Carrizo (969-1260) Vol. I. León: Centro de estudios e investigación «San Isidoro» (CSIC), Caja de Ahorros y Monte de Piedad de León y Archivo histórico diocesano. ISBN 84-00 05371-0.
- Torres Sevilla-Quiñones de León, Margarita Cecilia (1999). Linajes nobiliarios de León y Castilla. Siglos IX-XIII (in Spanish). Salamanca: Junta de Castilla y León, Consejería de educación y cultura. ISBN 84-7846-781-5.
