= Rodrigo Álvarez =

Galician nobleman

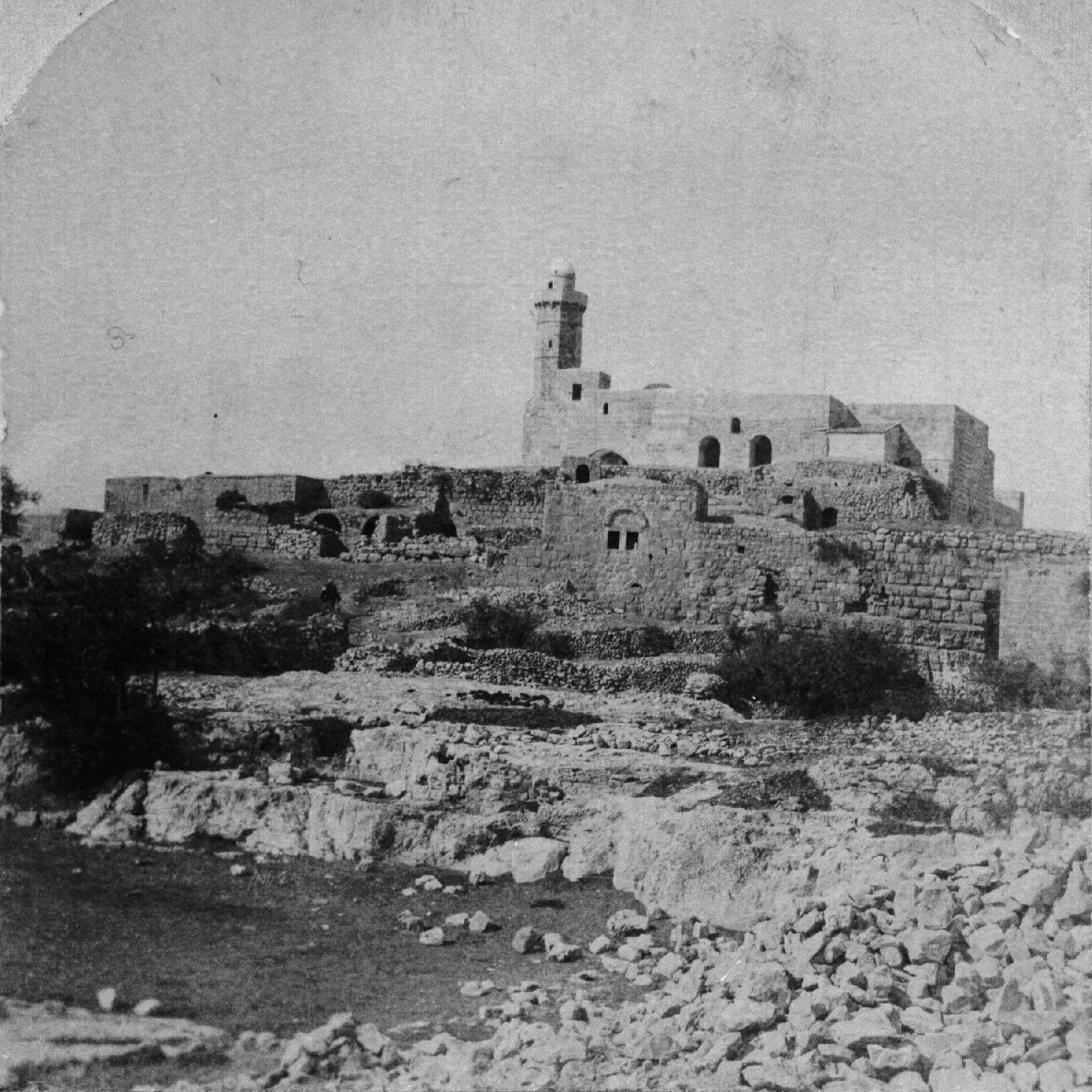
Ruins of Mountjoy complex on Nabi Samwil, headquarters of the military order founded by Rodrigo. He began construction on a chapel on the site sometime between 1176 and 1180.

Rodrigo Álvarez (Latin: Rudericus Aluari) (died 1187) was a Galician nobleman and crusader from the Kingdom of León. He founded the military Order of Mountjoy in 1174 and affiliated it with the Cistercian Order that he had long patronised.

Rodrigo was a son of Álvaro Rodríguez and Sancha Fernández. He entered the public record in a royal charter of 13 June 1161. A sign of his landed wealth is given by the properties he held at Buján, Fafián, Goon, and Levasser, which he at one point mortgaged for 200 maravedíes. He and his brother Vermudo also came to own lands on the river Esla in the province of León, probably through their mother's second marriage to the Leonese count Pedro Alfonso. Early he received the tenencia (fief from the crown) of Allariz, where he is attested on 18 September 1162. By 1165 he was also holding the region of Lemos from the crown, and in 1168 also Monterroso. After the death of his father in January 1167 he was given the title Count, the highest rank in the kingdom, and received the tenencia of Sarria, which he held until 1171. During those four years (1168–71) he was a regular attendee of the court of King Ferdinand II. At an unknown date, Rodrigo married María, daughter of Ponce de Minerva and Estefanía Ramírez. For her bridewealth Rodrigo gave her the church of San Pelayo de Villamuriel, which she in turn granted to San Marcos de León on 3 June 1172.

At an unknown date Rodrigo—in his own words, "seized by diabolical rage"—burned down the church of Santa María de Mal. On 20 February 1171, in penance for this sin, he donated the church San Salvador de Sarria to the Cathedral of Lugo. Later that year, perhaps out of guilt, he resigned his tenencias and joined the Order of Santiago. Two documents of September 1172/3 place Rodrigo, as a knight of the Order, at the court of Afonso I of Portugal in Coimbra. By 1172 Rodrigo had grown dissatisfied with the lax practices of the Order of Santiago, especially the allowance for members to marry, and he received permission from the Papal legate Jacinth to Spain to found a new confraternity in accordance with the Cistercian rule (instituta Cisterciensis ordinis). This was approved by Pope Alexander III the next year. Alexander forbade the new order to accept any former members of Santiago or to acquire any properties that might be disputed by Santiago. The use of the Cistercian rule caused some controversy at the Abbey of Cîteaux, where the chapter objected to Rodrigo's "inconstancy", but the abbot eventually approved it without the consent of the chapter, which was obtained later (by December 1175). Late in 1173 or early in 1174 Rodrigo and a few companions founded the Order of Mountjoy. Shortly afterwards his wife separated from him and later joined her mother's convent at Carrizo (founded 1176), where she would be abbess between 1184 and 1191. On 28 November 1190 she gave some more of her bridewealth to San Marcos de León and the Order of Santiago. She probably died in 1192.

The rest of his life Rodrigo devoted to growing his newfound order. According to a bull of Innocent III he chose for his Order a half-red, half-white cross. He received support from Alfonso II of Aragon, who donated the castle of Alfambra to the order in return for military aid against the Muslims. He was also able to acquire estates in the Kingdom of Jerusalem, including Mountjoy, after which the order took its name. In 1176–77 he made a pilgrimage to the Holy Land. He received lands from Reginald of Châtillon that King Baldwin IV only confirmed on the condition that Rodrigo and his knights fight the Muslims continuously in the Holy Land. In 1186 an attempted merger was made with the Knights Templar, and it is possible that Rodrigo was already dying at that stage. He had almost certainly died by the autumn of 1187. He was buried in the convent of Alfambra. He had been a patron of the Cistercians. Besides founding a military order under their auspices, he endowed their foundations at Gradefes (29 September 1173) and Meira (1182).

== Bibliography ==
- Barton, Simon (1997). The Aristocracy in Twelfth-century León and Castile. Cambridge: Cambridge University Press, esp. p. 291.
- Blázquez, A. (1917). "Bosquejo histórico de la Orden de Monte Gaudio". Boletín de la Real Academia de la Historia, 71:138–72.
- Canal Sánchez-Pagín, José María (1983). "El conde don Rodrigo Álvarez de Sarria, fundador de la orden militar de Monte Gaudio". Compostellanum, 28:373–97.
- Canal Sánchez-Pagín, José María (1995). "La Casa de Haro en León y Castilla durante el siglo XII: Nuevas conclusiones". Anuario de estudios medievales, 25(1):3–38.
- Delaville Le Roulx, J. (1893). "L'Ordre de Monjoye". Revue de l'Orient Latin, 1:42–57.
- Forey, Alan J. (1971). "The Order of Mountjoy". Speculum, 46(2):250–66.
- O'Callaghan, Joseph F. (1969). "Hermandades between the Military Orders of Calatrava and Santiago during the Castilian Reconquest, 1158–1252". Speculum, 44(4):609–18.
- Salazar Acha, Jaime de (1985). "Una familia de la alta Edad Media: Los Velas y su realidad histórica". Estudios Genealógicos y Heráldicos, 1:19–64.
