= Ramiro Fróilaz =

Leonese magnate

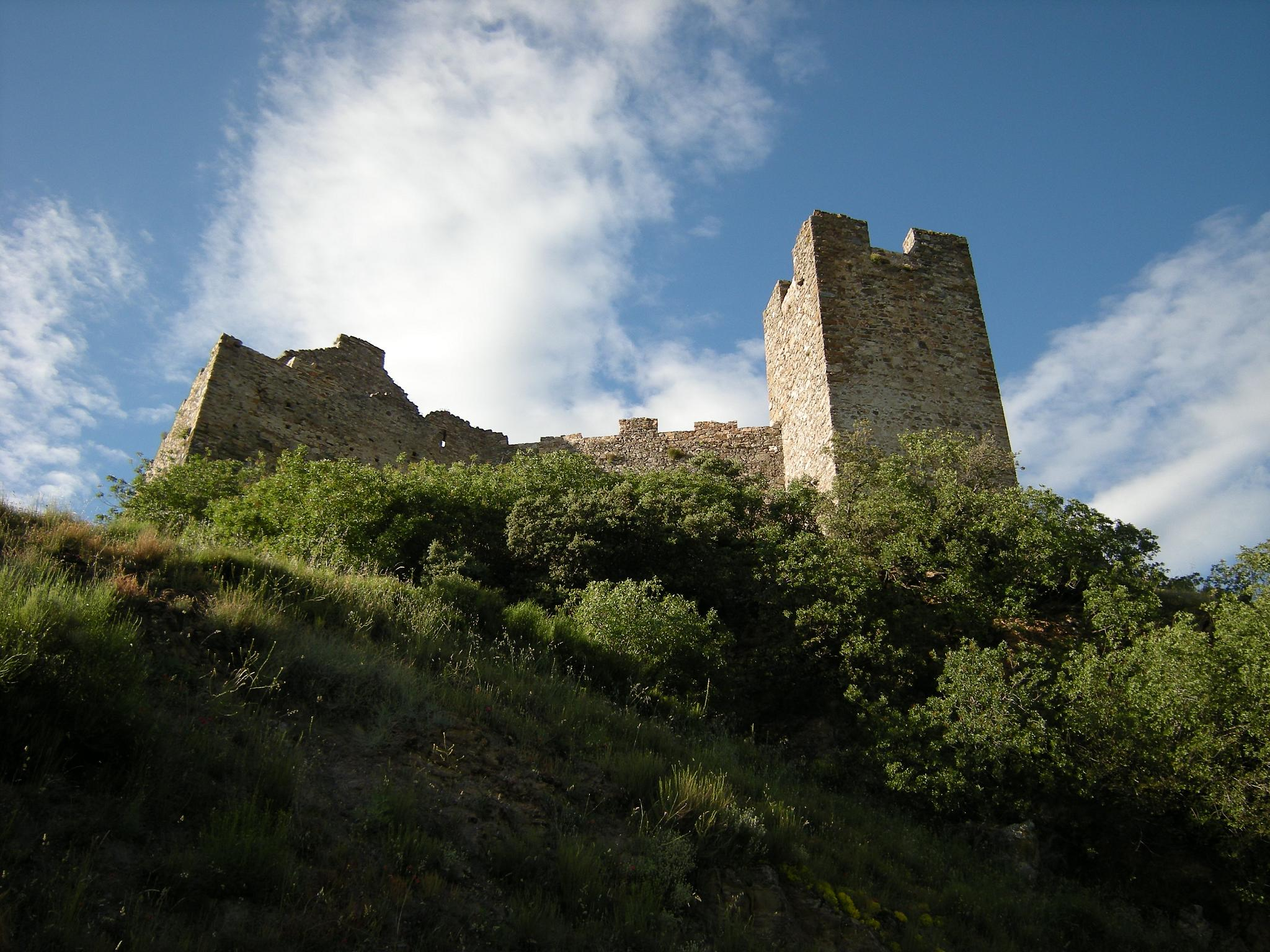
The castle of Ulver, ruled by Ramiro for over forty years.

Ramiro Fróilaz (floruit 1120–1169) was a Leonese magnate, statesman, and military leader. He was a dominant figure in the kingdom during the reigns of Alfonso VII and Ferdinand II. He was primarily a territorial governor, but also a court figure, connected to royalty both by blood and by marriage. The military exploits of his sovereigns involved him against both the neighbouring kingdoms of Navarre and Portugal and in the Reconquista of the lands of al-Andalus.

== Family ==
Ramiro was the eldest son of Fruela Díaz and Estefanía Sánchez of the Navarrese royal house, daughter of Sancho Garcés, Lord of Uncastillo. Ramiro's first wife was Inés (Agnès), perhaps a member of the French royal house or the family of the Counts of Armagnac. She was buried in the church of San Isidoro de León, where her epitaph names her husband and describes her as "descended from the kings of France". She was the mother of his eldest two sons, Alfonso and Fruela. On 22 September 1150 Ramiro gave these two the bridewealth (arras) which he had neglected to give their mother before her death. In the same charter, he gave them the lands he had confiscated from his niece, Estefanía Díaz, who had married without his consent, also mentioning the arras that he had given his other two wives, Sancha and Elo.

Ramiro's second wife was Sancha, an obscure woman whose origins are unknown. She gave him a son and a daughter: García and Estefanía, who married Ponce de Minerva. On the occasion of her marriage, the king and Ramiro gave Ponce their respective halves of the village of Carrizo de la Ribera, where Estefanía later erected a monastery (1176). Estefanía and Ponce's only son was named Ramiro after his grandfather.

Ramiro's third wife was Elo (Eilo) Álvarez, daughter of Álvar Fáñez and Mayor Pérez and widow of Rodrigo Fernández de Castro. She was named after her maternal grandmother, Elo Alfonso, wife of Pedro Ansúrez. This last marriage extended Ramiro's influence into the Tierra de Campos.

On 1 June 1153 Ramiro and his wife Elo terminated a dispute with his sister, María Fróilaz, and her husband, Pedro Alfonso, over the water source at a certain Villanueva. Also that year Ramiro granted an estate at Villaseca to García Pérez and his wife, Teresa Pérez, as a reward for their loyal service. García, a son of Pedro Martínez and grandson of Martín Flaínez, served as a knight in Ramiro's household. García was also a loyal servant of the king, who granted him largesse on three occasions. Teresa later (1177) founded the Cistercian monastery of Gradefes, and it is in the records of this establishment that Ramiro's gift can be read.

== Early public career ==
The earliest reference to Ramiro is in a now lost charter recording the foundation of the monastery of Santa María de Arbas del Puerto. A résumé of the charter was kept in the Archivo Histórico Nacional during the directorship of Juan Menéndez Pidal, whose brother, the historian Ramón Menéndez Pidal, concluded from it that "the same count and countess Fruela Díaz and Estefanía, with their children Ramiro, Diego, Constanza and María, founded the monastery of Arbas, in the gate of Pajares [now Payares], on 15 March 1116."

In November 1123 Ramiro was the alcalde (justiciar) of Toledo, a post he probably held into 1124. He is described in two charters as urbis alcaldus (justiciar of the city) and toletanus alcaidus (Toledan justiciar). The Chronica Adefonsi imperatoris, a contemporary account of the reign of Alfonso VII, records that Ramiro Fróilaz (Radimirus Froile) was one of those who came to the city of León only after it had been captured by the king's allies, Alfonso Jordan and Suero Vermúdez, in 1126 to do him homage on his succession. He was one of those qui postea facti sunt comites ("who was later made count").

Between 29 May 1132 and 18 September 1133 Ramiro served as alférez of the royal armies, a post commonly reserved for the scions of noble houses. Except during the period when he was alférez, when he was constantly at court, Ramiro was a semi-regular courtier. In the year 1146, for example, he accompanied Alfonso VII for only about half the court's itinerary.

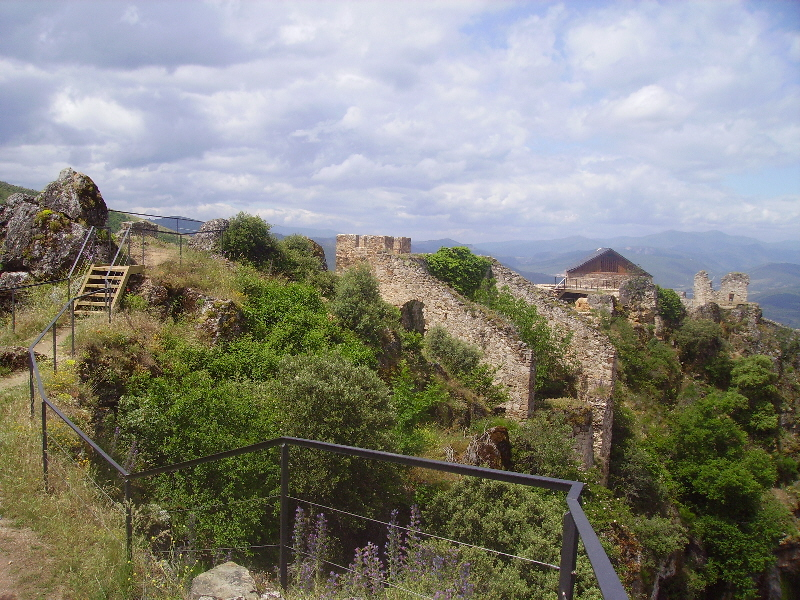
Ruins of the castle of Ulver.

== Tenancies ==
Ramiro held twenty-seven recorded fiefs from the crown (tenencias) in his long career. A scribe writing in 1145 referred to Ramiro as Comes Ramirus hic et ubique: "Count Ramiro, here and everywhere." Not long after the death of his father (1119), who had guarded the mountainous passes between the regions of León and Galicia, Queen Urraca appointed Ramiro castellan of Ulver in the Bierzo. At the same time Ramiro received from the crown the tenencia of La Cabrera, sometime before 6 March 1122/6, when he is first recorded as tenente there, although he had appointed one Menendeo Peláez as his merino. He held it at least until 5 March 1129. The next lord of the place, Ponce de Cabrera, is not mentioned until 13 May 1138. At Ulver Ramiro remained until at least 27 October 1128, when Ponce appears as holding it and entrusting it to a merino, Pelayo Peláez. By July 1133 Ramiro had regained Ulver and held it until 26 February 1169 and probably until his death. Between 1133 and 1155 he entrusted it to his vassal Fernando Peláez.

Sometime before 15 January 1128 (perhaps as early as 1123) Ramiro received the rule of the entire Bierzo. By 25 August 1131 Ramiro was the military governor of nearby Astorga in charge of its castle and walls. In 1137 he was entrusted with the fief of Aguilar, which had recently been confiscated from the mysteriously disgraced Osorio Martínez. Nuño Pérez, the castellan of the castle at Aguilar, for reasons unknown, rebelled against Ramiro, but was defeated by 2 December. Later Alfonso VII raised Ramiro to the rank of count, a title he first carried in a charter for the Diocese of Sigüenza dated 14 September 1138. By May 1139 Osorio had regained Aguilar, where he continued down to at least December 1140. Thereafter it returned to Ramiro to govern until at least December 1166.

From at least 18 May 1126 until as late as 22 June 1165 Ramiro was governing Valdeorras. There, on 13 September 1139, he heard a property dispute, an account of which has been preserved in the tumbo of San Pedro de Montes. The dispute occurred between the monastery of San Pedro and Mayor Sánchez and her sons concerning an estate at a place called Villa. While Mayor claimed to have purchased the land from its previous holder, Pedro Peláez, the monastery claimed that it was a pious donation. Ramiro, with some leading men of Valdeorras, both clergy and laity, arbitrating the dispute until the monks agreed to pay 160 solidi to Mayor in return for her renunciation of any rights to the estate.

Ramiro was ruling the city of León, where he owned houses and a palace (palacio), between 11 April 1141 and 4 July 1144. On 31 December 1156 Ramiro and Elo donated some houses they owned in León to the monastery of Vega, a daughter house of Fontevraud. In 1154/5 Ramiro's authority over the city of Astorga was shared with Ponce de Cabrera. There is no record of Ramiro holding Astorga after 20 September 1168. He was an old man when he died. Sometime before 1162 Ramiro was also co-tenant with Ponce at Villafranca del Bierzo.

Probably for nearly his entire adult life Ramiro governed Villabuena; there are records of his tenancy there between 1128 and 1166. He also governed Cifuentes for more than twenty years and Riba de Esla for more than a decade. Among the tenencias Ramiro governed only briefly—such that no more than one record of his lordship there survives—are Alba de Gordón, Avedillo de Sanabria, Ferreras, Molinaseca, Monteagudo, Oteros, Peñamián, Robledo, Tibres, and Trigueros. Among the tenencias which Ramiro governed later in his career (the last decade of the reign of Alfonso VII and the first of Ferdinand II) are found Argüello, Boñar, Caldelas, Casayo, Gordón, Villafranca, and Villarmildo.

== Military campaigns ==
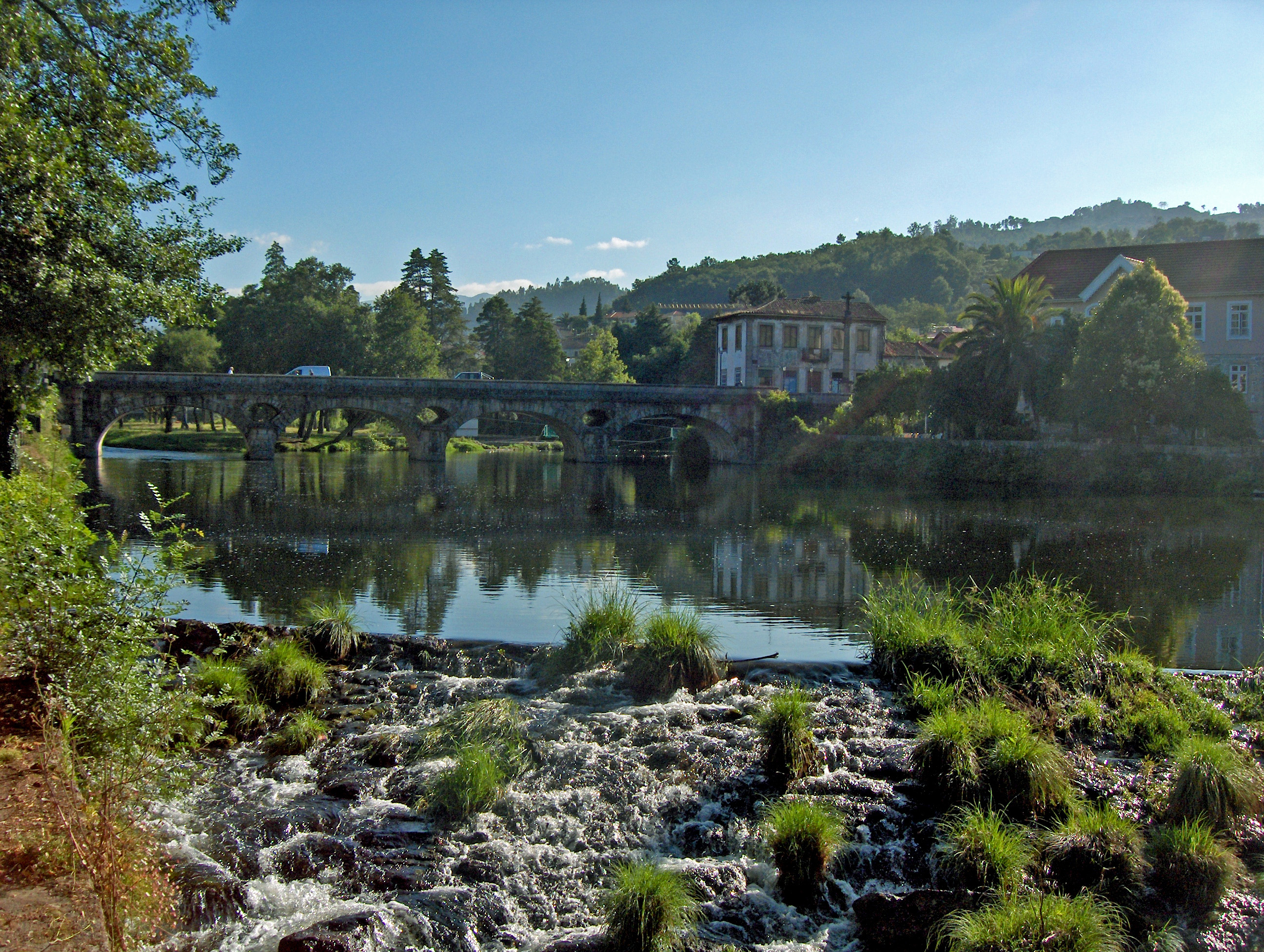
The river Vez and its medieval bridge, alongside which the battle of Valdevez was fought and Ramiro captured.

Jerónimo Zurita places Ramiro at the side of Alfonso VII in Zaragoza in 1134 during the campaign of harassment against García Ramírez of Navarre. In the summer of 1139 Ramiro was present at the long Siege of Oreja. In 1140 Ramiro went to war with Afonso Henriques, king of neighbouring Portugal, but was defeated and captured. There is no documentary evidence that he had gone with Alfonso into Portugal in 1137, but the Chronica Adefonsi (I, §82) narrates an episode involving him that occurred on the 1137 campaign:

The King of Portugal likewise mobilized his army and marched out to fight the few men who had foolishly been separated from the Emperor's main force. The Portuguese confronted Count Ramiro who was attempting to conquer their land. They joined in battle, and Ramiro was defeated and taken prisoner.

After the Battle of Valdevez the Portuguese and the Leonese came to terms, captured castles were surrendered and "Count Ramiro was released, and all the knights who had been captured on either side were given their freedom." The capture of Ramiro is not mentioned in the Crónica de Dom Afonso Henriques.

Briefly in 1147 Ramiro was stripped of the Bierzo, which was given to Sancha Raimúndez, the king's sister, but he was soon restored to it and continued to rule it until at least June 1169, probably until his death some short time later. This perhaps corresponded to Ramiro's absence on the campaign against Almería that year. Although the Poema de Almería records his presence at the siege of the city, royal documents do not record him with the army after 11 July, just before the siege of Andújar. He had not joined the army until shortly before 23 May at Toledo and had missed the capitulation of Calatrava on 11 January. The anonymous author of the Poema names Ramiro second of the great nobles in the following of Alfonso VII at Almería:

Hos Radimirus sequitur comes ordine mirus, prudens et mitis Legionis cura salutis, forma praeclarus, natus de semine regum.	Count Ramiro Fróilaz appears. He is admirable in his rank, prudent and kind, caring for the salvation of León, a distinguished figure born of royal blood.

Ramiro was an elder statesman during the reign of Alfonso's successor in León, Ferdinand II. On 23 May 1158 he was the first-named guarantor of Ferdinand II in the Treaty of Sahagún, which ended a state of war between Ferdinand and his brother, Sancho III of Castile. Ramiro's death probably occurred in 1169. His obituary is recorded in the records of the church of San Isidoro, where he is buried. In the seventeenth century, historian José Pellicer de Ossau y Tovar said of "Ramiro Frolaz" that "he was one of the greatest grandees Spain had, and his name endures in the histories from the year 1120 down to 1168."

== Bibliography ==
- Barton, Simon (1992). "Two Catalan magnates in the courts of the kings of León-Castile: The careers of Ponce de Cabrera and Ponce de Minerva re-examined." Journal of Medieval History, 18:3, 233–66.
- Barton, Simon (1997). The Aristocracy in Twelfth-century León and Castile. Cambridge: Cambridge University Press.
- Barton, Simon (2000). "From Tyrants to Soldiers of Christ: The Nobility of Twelfth-century León-Castile and the Struggle Against Islam." Nottingham Medieval Studies, 44.
- Barton, Simon (2006). "The 'Discovery of Aristocracy' in Twelfth-Century Spain: Portraits of the Secular Élite in the Poem of Almería." Bulletin of Hispanic Studies, 83.
- Barton, Simon and Richard A. Fletcher (2000). The World of El Cid: Chronicles of the Spanish Reconquest. Manchester: Manchester University Press
- Cadenas Allende, Francisco de, "Los Flagínez: una familia leonesa de hace mil años," Estudios genealógicos, heráldicos y nobiliarios en honor de Vicente de Cadenas y Vicente, 2 vols. (Madrid, 1978), I, 177–211.
- Canal Sánchez-Pagín, José María (1986). "El conde leonés Fruela Díaz y su esposa la navarra doña Estefanía Sánchez (siglos XI–XII)." Príncipe de Viana, 47:177, 23–42.
- Estepa Díez, C. (1977). Estructura social de la ciudad de León (siglos XI–XIII). León.
- Lipskey, Glenn Edward (1972). The Chronicle of Alfonso the Emperor: A Translation of the Chronica Adefonsi imperatoris. PhD dissertation, Northwestern University.
- Martínez Sopena, P. (1985). La Tierra de Campos Occidental: poblamiento, poder y comunidad del siglo X al XIII. Valladolid.
- Reilly, Bernard F. (1982). The Kingdom of León-Castilla under Queen Urraca, 1109–1126. Princeton: Princeton University Press.
- Reilly, Bernard F. (1998). The Kingdom of León-Castilla under King Alfonso VII, 1126–1157. Philadelphia: University of Pennsylvania Press.
- Salazar y Acha, Jaime de (1985). "Una familia de la alta Edad Media: Los Velas y su realidad histórica". Estudios Genealógicos y Heráldicos, 1:19–64.
