= Monastery of Santa María de Sandoval =

Catholic monastery in Spain

Coordinates: 42.4995°N 5.4593°W

- Monasterio de Santa María de Sandoval
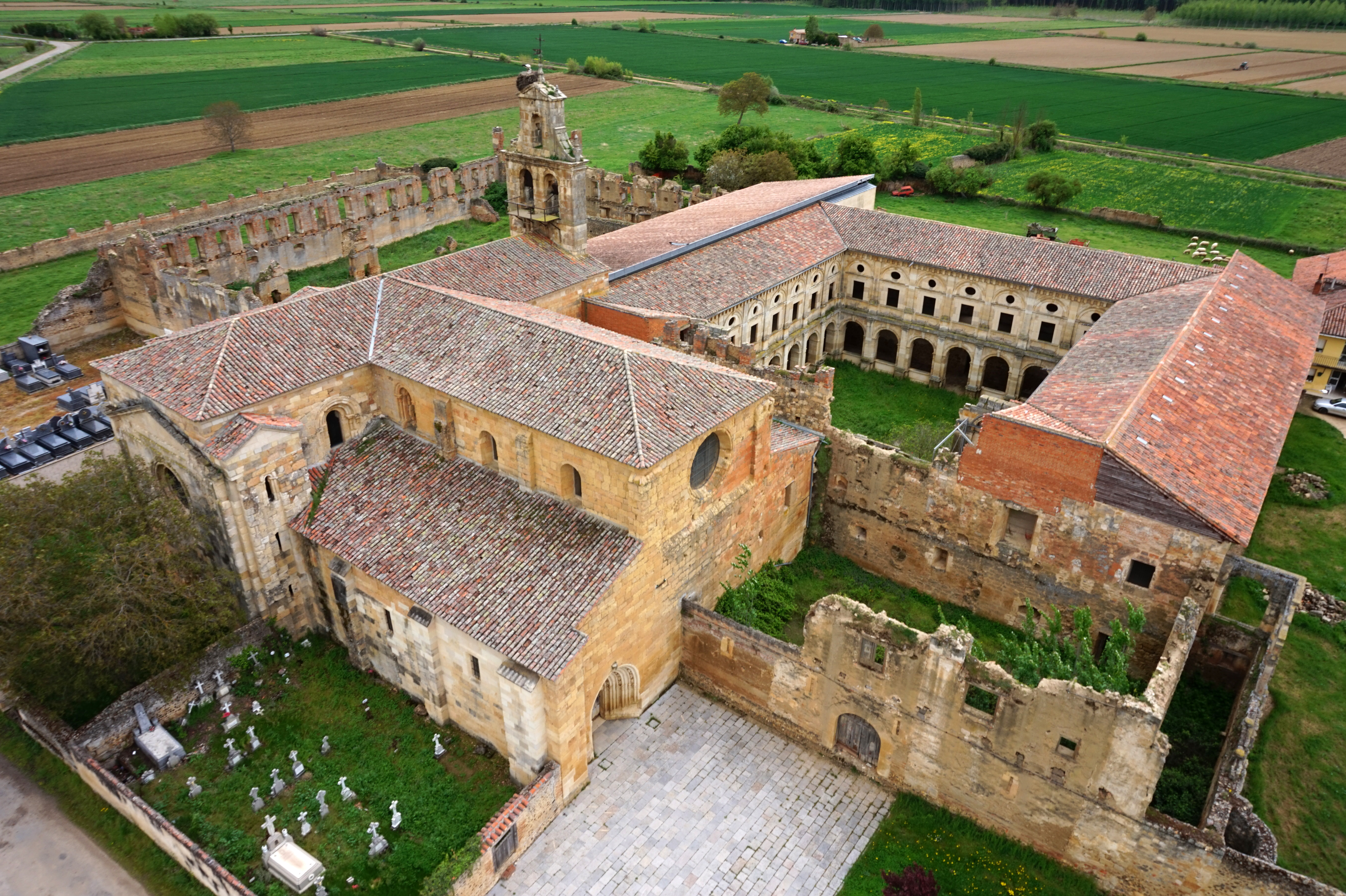

Religion
- Affiliation: Catholic Church
- Province: León

Location
- Location: Villaverde de Sandoval
- Municipality: Mansilla Mayor
- Country: Spain
- Interactive map of Monastery of Santa María de Sandoval

Architecture
- Completed: 15th century

Santa María de Sandoval was a Roman Catholic monastery of the Cistercian Order in Spain from the 12th century until 1835. The oldest part was built in the Romanesque style, but later additions are Gothic. Today its ruins lie in Villaverde de Sandoval. It has been listed as a monumento histórico-artístico (historical artistic monument) since 3 June 1931. In 2015, the Spanish government listed it as an "associated element" of the Camino de Santiago, a UNESCO World Heritage Site.

In 1142, the Emperor Alfonso VII gave a piece of land to his majordomo, Count Ponce de Minerva. Known as Sotnoval or Saltus Novalis, it lay near the confluence of the rivers Porma and Esla a few miles outside the city of León. In 1167, Ponce and his wife, Estefanía Ramírez, with the consent of their children, Ramiro, María and Sancha, gave the land to Abbot Diego Martínez of the monastery of Santa María de la Santa Espina for the construction of a new Cistercian monastery. Monastic life began at Sandoval in 1171 with twelve monks from La Santa Espina under Abbot Diego. Although Sandoval began as a daughter house of La Santa Espina, in a short time it would equal its spiritual parent in importance.

Among Sandoval's early patrons was Urraca, daughter of Alfonso VII, whose anniversary mass was celebrated there on 25 June. The monastery received not only real property in donations, such as dehesas, but also feudal rights. In 1222, the monastery received land and dehesas from King Ferdinand III. It also had a small daughter house of its own at Valdellán.

After 1487, Sandoval became part of the Congregation of Castile, a group of reformed Spanish Cistercian houses founded by Martín de Vargas.

In 1835, the monks abandoned the monastery during the first confiscation of Mendizábal. It continued to be used as a parish church and services are still occasionally celebrated there.

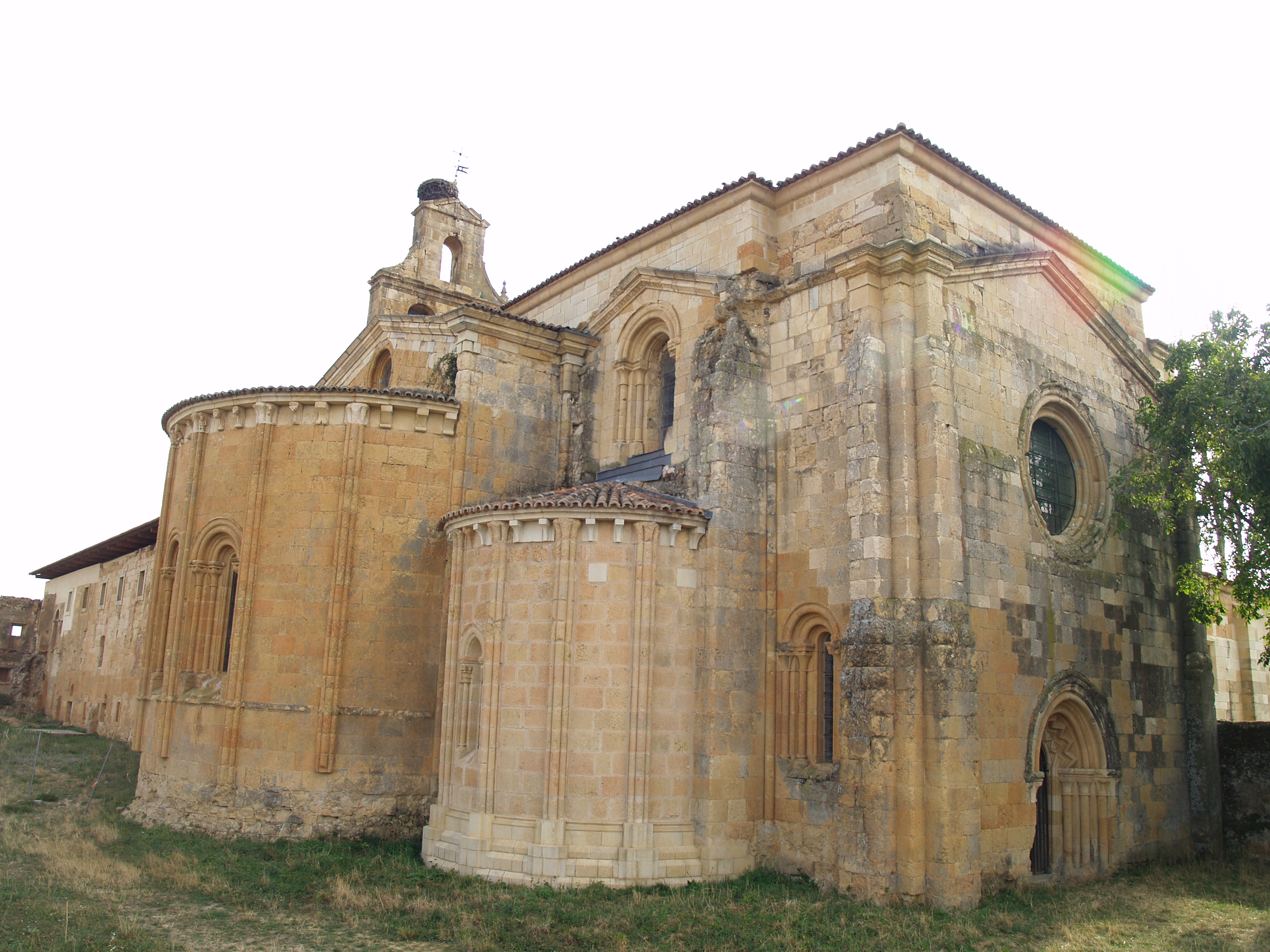
Central apse

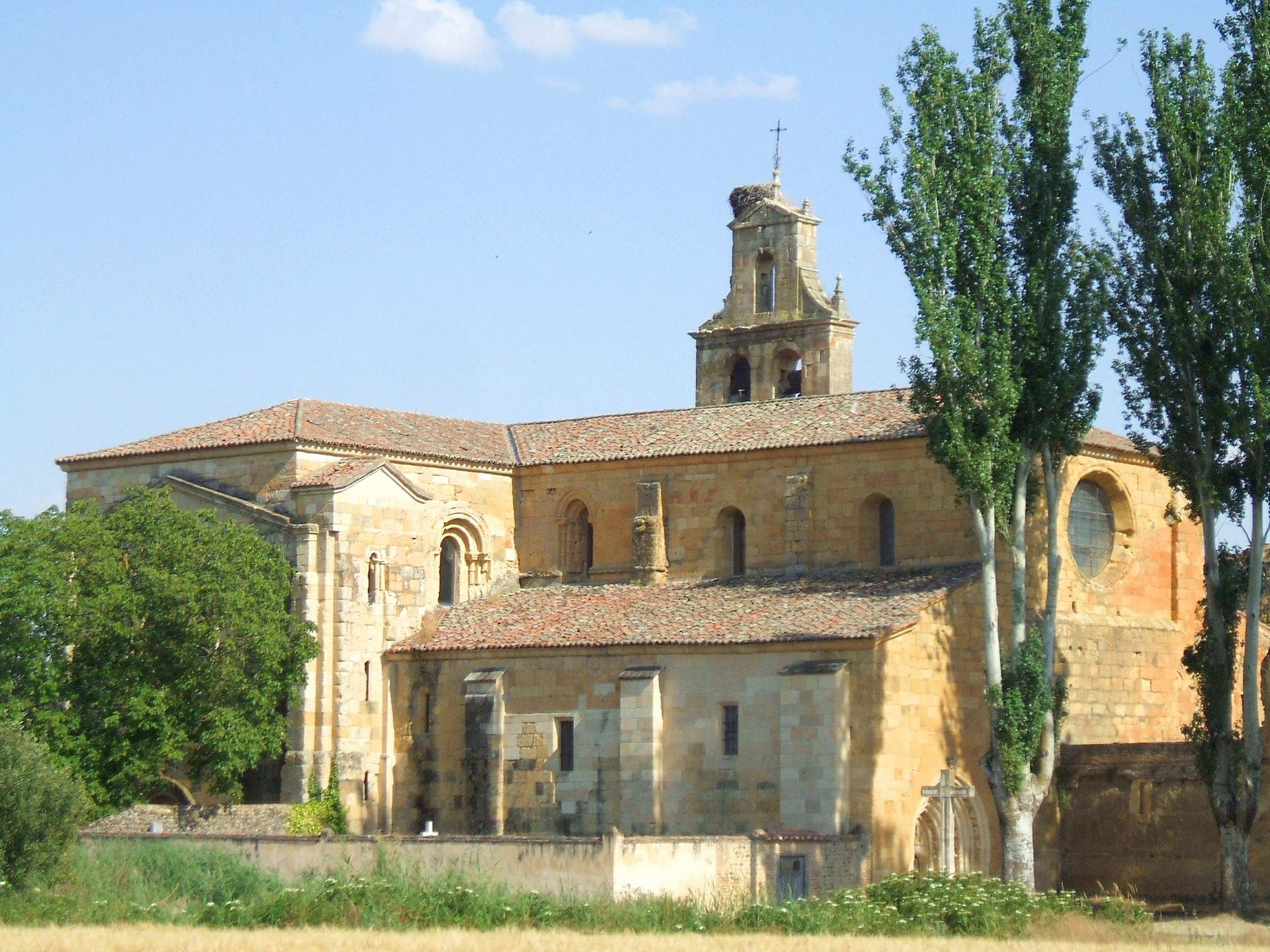
Exterior

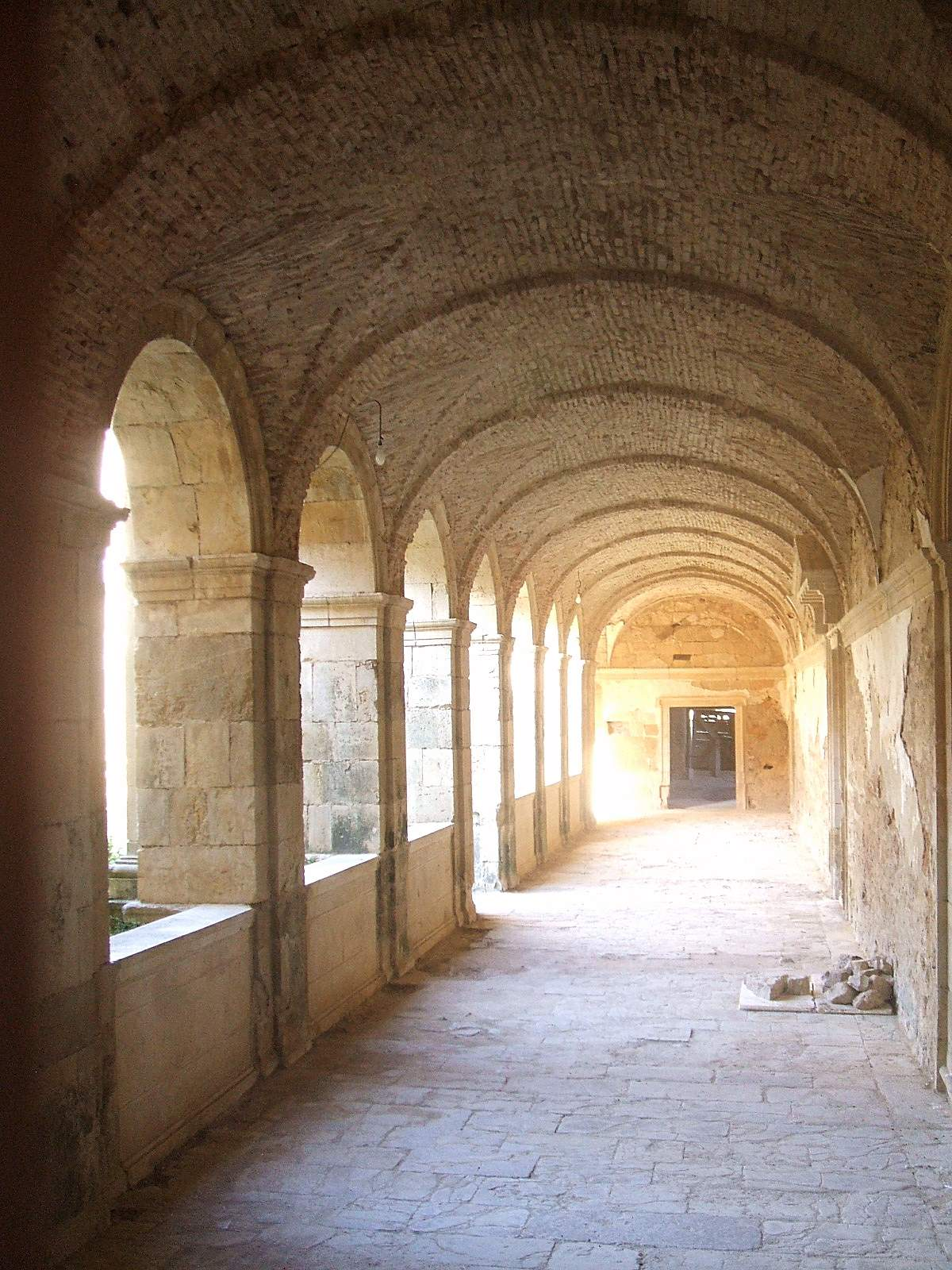
Cloisters

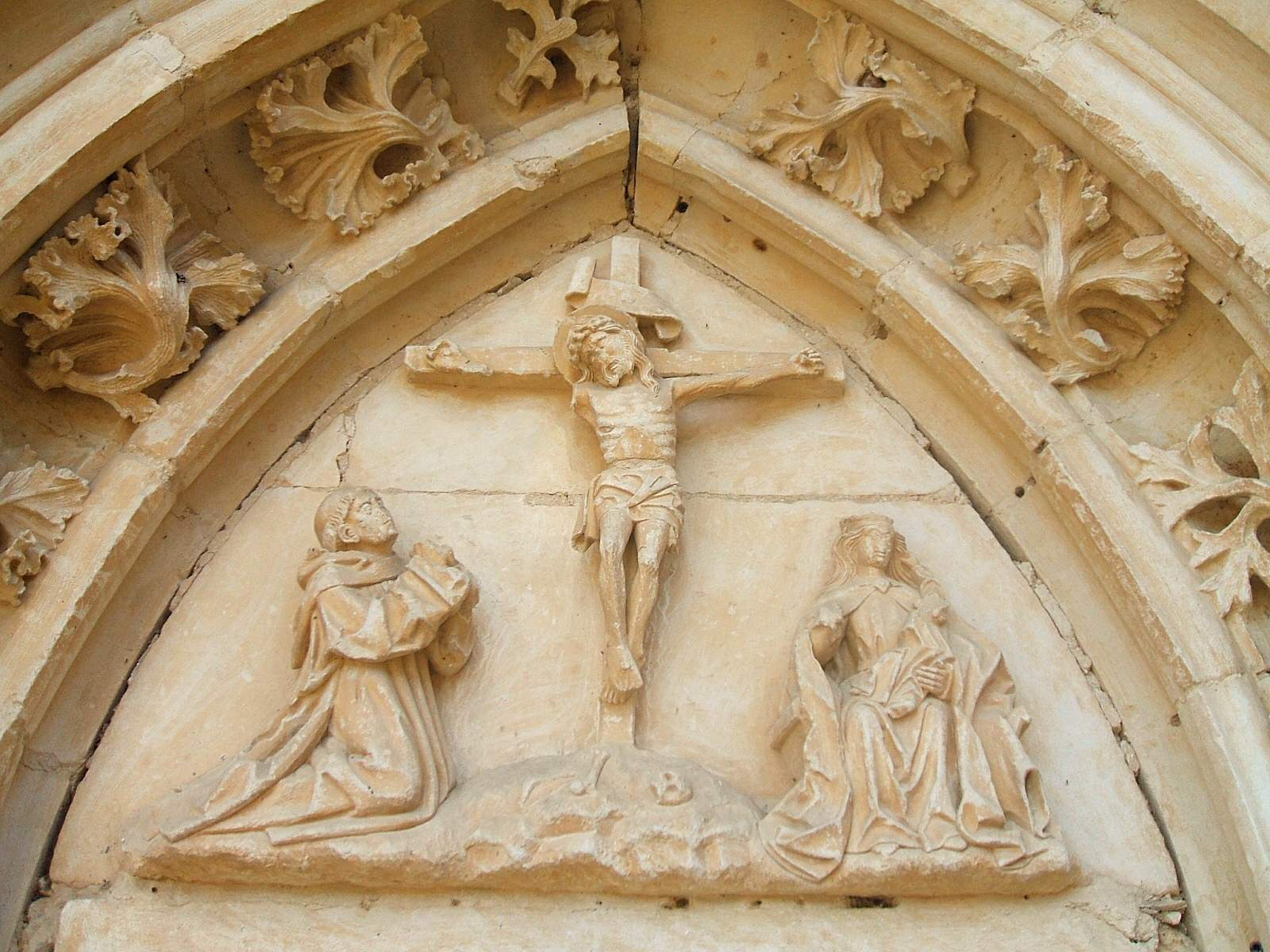
Portal
