= Estefanía Ramírez =

Estefanía Ramírez may refer to:

- Estefanía Ramírez (noblewoman) (–1183), Spanish noblewoman
- Estefanía Ramírez (rugby union) (born 1991), Colombian rugby union player
