= Diego Martínez de Villamayor =

Diego Martínez de Villamayor (died 5 November 1176) was a noble of the Kingdom of Castile from the house of the counts of Bureba, who was very influential at court. He was the advisor of Alfonso VII and Sancho III, and treasurer of Alfonso VIII.

Diego Martínez de Villamayor was the son of Martín Díaz of the house of Salvadores. His mother is sometimes given as María García of the house of Villamayor and sometimes as Jimena Pérez. He inherited land at Benevívere from his mother. He married María Ponce de Minerva, daughter of Ponce de Minerva and Estefanía Sánchez.

After losing his wife Diego Martínez decided to retire and devote himself to the contemplative life. He helped restore the monasteries of San Andrés de Valvení, Santiago de la Tola and Sandoval. He laid the foundation of the Abbey of Santa María de Benevívere in 1169. He gave it the rule of Saint Augustine and a Cistercian liturgy, and established a hospital dedicated to San Torcuato attached to it. Before 1173 he appointed as its first prior Pascual Rustan. The monastery's church building was not completed at his death. In his will, dated 22 October 1176, he left it to this brother, Rodrigo, the "second founder of Benevívere", to complete. Diego's sepulchre bears the inscription: "Here lies Diego Martínez of venerable memory, builder of the house of Benevívere, patron of the house, whose soul rests in peace."

The Poema de Benevívere (Poem of Benevívere) was written in Latin around the end of the thirteenth century in 758 verses. The poem tells the story of Diego Martínez de Villamayor, who aspired to be a saint, and King Alfonso VIII of Castile. It contrasts the religious and secular goals and ideals, and shows their intimate relationship.
