= Villamandos =

Coordinates: 42°11′N 5°35′W

- municipality
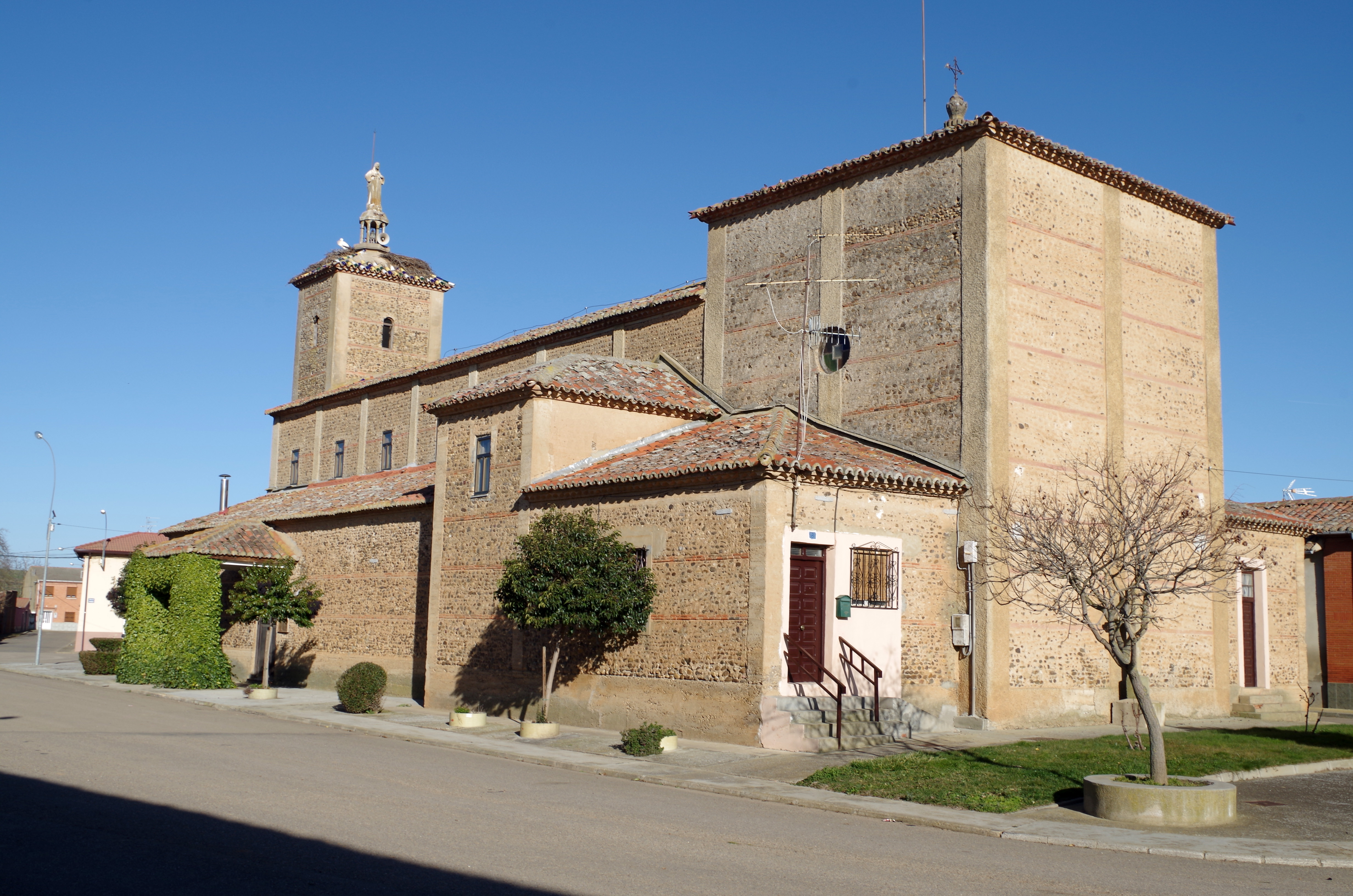

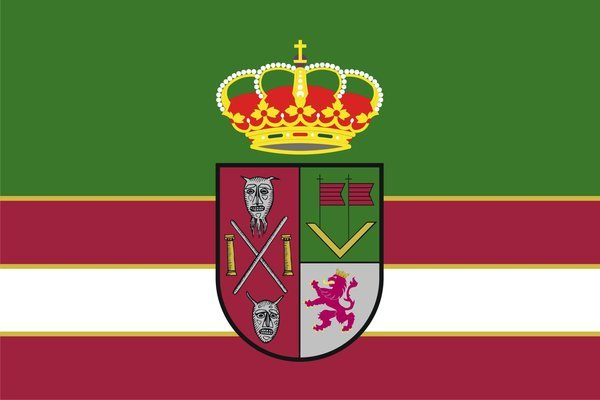
- Flag Coat of arms
- Interactive map of Villamandos
- Country: Spain
- Autonomous community: Castile and León
- Province: León
- Municipality: Villamandos

Area
  - Total: 16.23 km^{2} (6.27 sq mi)
- Elevation: 730 m (2,400 ft)

Population (2025-01-01)
  - Total: 272
  - Density: 16.8/km^{2} (43.4/sq mi)
- Time zone: UTC+1 (CET)
  - Summer (DST): UTC+2 (CEST)

Villamandos is a municipality located in the province of León, Castile and León, Spain. According to the 2004 census (INE), the municipality had a population of 374 inhabitants.
