= Pedro Alfonso =

Asturian magnate

Pulcher ut Absalon, virtute potens quasi Sanson, instructisque bonis, documenta tenet Salomonis.

"[Pedro] is handsome as Absalom, as strong as Samson, and he possesses the wisdom of Solomon."

—Poema de Almería, vv. 117–18

Pedro Alfonso or Alfónsez (Latin: Petrus Adefonsi; floruit 1126–1173) was an Asturian magnate, dominating the region from 1139 until his death. He had vast landholdings in the Asturias, the region of León, and "kingdom" of Toledo, including in the cities of León and Toledo themselves, the most important cities of the realm. His commercial dealings were extensive, a sign of his economic power, and he loyally served Alfonso VII and his son Ferdinand II as a military commander and diplomat from 1128 until his death.

== Family ==
Pedro was the son of Alfonso Vermúdez, himself the son of Bermudo Ovéquiz of the Vela family and Jimena Peláez, and Urraca Raimúndez, possibly the daughter of Raymond the Fratricide who had to flee Navarre after participating in the murder of his brother king Sancho IV of Navarre in 1076. Pedro took as his first wife María Fróilaz, daughter of Froila Díaz and widow of Melendo Núñez. Her mother, Estefanía Sánchez, was a daughter of Sancho Garcés, the illegitimate half-brother of Sancho IV of Navarre. They were married by 30 November 1143 and were still together as late as 4 October 1164. They had one daughter named Elvira Pérez, who was Pedro's primary heiress. In December 1174 Elvira donated her father's former estates in Santa Marina and Villaverde to the Order of Calatrava. On 26 June 1175 she made a donation to the Order of Santiago of the "houses, baths, ovens, lands, vineyards, orchards, and gardens" in Toledo as well as the lands in Azaña that she had inherited from her "illustrious" father.

By 7 September 1170, when they made a grant to the monastery of Santa María de Lapedo, Pedro had remarried to Sancha Fernández, daughter of count Fernando Pérez de Traba and Theresa, Countess of Portugal, since 1167 the widow of Álvaro Rodríguez. She was a generous benefactress of various religious institutions, giving to Sobrado, Caabeiro, and Meira between 1157 and 1171. By April 1178 she was remarried to Gonzalo Ruiz, when she granted the arras she had received from Pedro to the Knights Hospitaller. Additionally, some properties on the river Esla owned by Sancha's sons by Álvaro, Rodrigo and Vermudo, appear to have derived from Pedro's properties. She was still alive on 9 March 1181.

== Political and military life ==
According to the Chronica Adefonsi imperatoris, Pedro was among the first group of nobles to do homage to Alfonso VII at Zamora in March 1126. For a year, between 8 July 1129 and 10 June 1130, he served as alférez, or standard-bearer in charge of the knights of the royal household, an office typically held by promising young noblemen. In 1133 Alfonso VII charged Pedro and his uncle, Suero Vermúdez, with bringing to heel the rebellious Asturian count Gonzalo Peláez. They had with them "all the Asturians", according to the Chronica Adefonsi, which describes the start of the campaign thus:

Pedro Alfonso besieged Alba de Quirós. Count Gonzalo was at that time entrenched in Proaza. The forces of the King bravely tightened the siege against the rebels. They set up ambushes all around the castles, along the roads and paths and over the mountains. Whomever they caught, they sent away with his hands cut off. This was done for several days. The Count had been rebelling against the King for nearly two years.

The war against Gonzalo raged for another two years. In 1135 Suero, Pedro, and Arias Núñez, then Bishop of León, negotiated a short-lived peace settlement. Pedro was present at the coronation of Alfonso as imperator totius Hispaniae in May 1135, perhaps staying in tents like the rest of the nobility, even though he owned houses in the city. In the autumn of 1136 Gonzalo Peláez rebelled again and this time was captured by Pedro, who imprisoned him in the castle at Aguilar de Campoo in the province of León.

As early as 30 November 1139 Pedro was governing the region of Asturias de Oviedo, with Salcedo, which he would continue to rule until 1170. According to the Poema de Almería, he accompanied Alfonso on the campaign that conquered Almería in 1147. In 1148 after returning to Toledo he was promoted to the rank of "count" (comes), the highest dignity in the kingdom. The Poema has much to say about him and his first wife:

Meanwhile, the daring Asturian chief measures his pace. He is neither hateful nor harsh with anyone. He is undefeated on sea and on land. He is powerful in his forces, not fearing the dangers of death. He is correct in his appearance, and he scorns death. He is dexterous in battle and no less competent in the hunt. Traversing the mountains, he knows where to find the springs of water. He disdains the waves of the sea as if they were the furrows in a field. No one equals him in surmounting opposition. This people constantly seeks the Savior's protection as they gallop from the northern shores. They join other comrades with the greatest speed. The illustrious Pedro Alfonso was their leader (dux illustris). He was not yet a consul, but he was equal to all in his own right. He is a burden to no one. He stands out among all as a virtuous man, and he is famed for his honor. He exceeds all of his peers in integrity. He is as handsome as Absalom, as strong as Samson, and he possesses the wisdom of Solomon. The Emperor made him a consul upon returning from his campaign. He attained this honored title through his own merits. Pedro Alfonso was indeed respected by the Emperor among his nobles. His royal and pious wife María enhanced his distinction. She was the daughter of a count, and through her merits she became a countess. Shining like a jewel she will thus live on through the ages.

At the outset of the Almería campaign Pedro was holding the tenencias of Ablaña and Tineo in Asturias and Babia in León between the Luna and Omañas rivers. He was holding Babia as late as 27 June 1163 and Tineo 18 July 1167. Between 1157 and 1162 there are scattered references to Pedro holding the Asturian tenencias of Luna, Orna, and Teberga. By December 1168 Pedro had been granted the tenencia of Gozón, also in Asturias.

== Commercial transactions ==
Between 1148 and 1154 Pedro was especially keen to acquire interest in Asturian monasteries. During this period he purchased properties in seven monasteria (monastic estates). On 1 June 1153 Pedro got into a property dispute with fellow count Ramiro Fróilaz over the waters of a certain Villanueva. In May 1162 Pedro sold some property at Villa Marín to his brother Rodrigo. In February 1154 one Greo Pérez placed himself and his land under the protection of Pedro Alfonso in exchange for provision of clothing and food. Pedro and his first wife's property acquisitions in the Asturias and León were extensive: between 30 November 1143 and 23 November 1161 they made eight (possibly nine) separate transactions.

In October 1155 Pedro entered into an agreement with a certain Miguel Azarafi. Pedro had received a bathhouse in the district of Santa Leocadia in Toledo from the king on some previous date, and in 1155 he granted it to Miguel Azarafi, who was responsible for repairing it at his own expense save for the boiler, which Pedro was responsible to replace. The profits from the bathhouse were to be divided between the two. This is the only example from the twelfth century of a nobleman in León–Castile engaged in commercial speculation.

== Religious patronage ==
The monastery of Lapedo belonged in Pedro's family. According to the Historia compostellana, he attained complete control of it in two agreements with his brother Gonzalo and his cousin Vela Gutiérrez on 23 and 29 July 1141 respectively. The list of Pedro and his first wife's donations to Lapedo is long. In 1149 he made a donation of sixteen cows to the cathedral of San Salvador de Oviedo. Pedro was also an important benefactor of the Benedictine foundations of Asturias. He made donations to San Juan Bautista de Corias, which he had held in comanda since 1140; to Vega (1156); and to Lorenzana (1168). Late in life he made a donation to the Cistercian monastery of Saint Mary at Nogales (1172).
