= Santa Clara de Avedillo =

Coordinates: 41°20′N 5°40′W

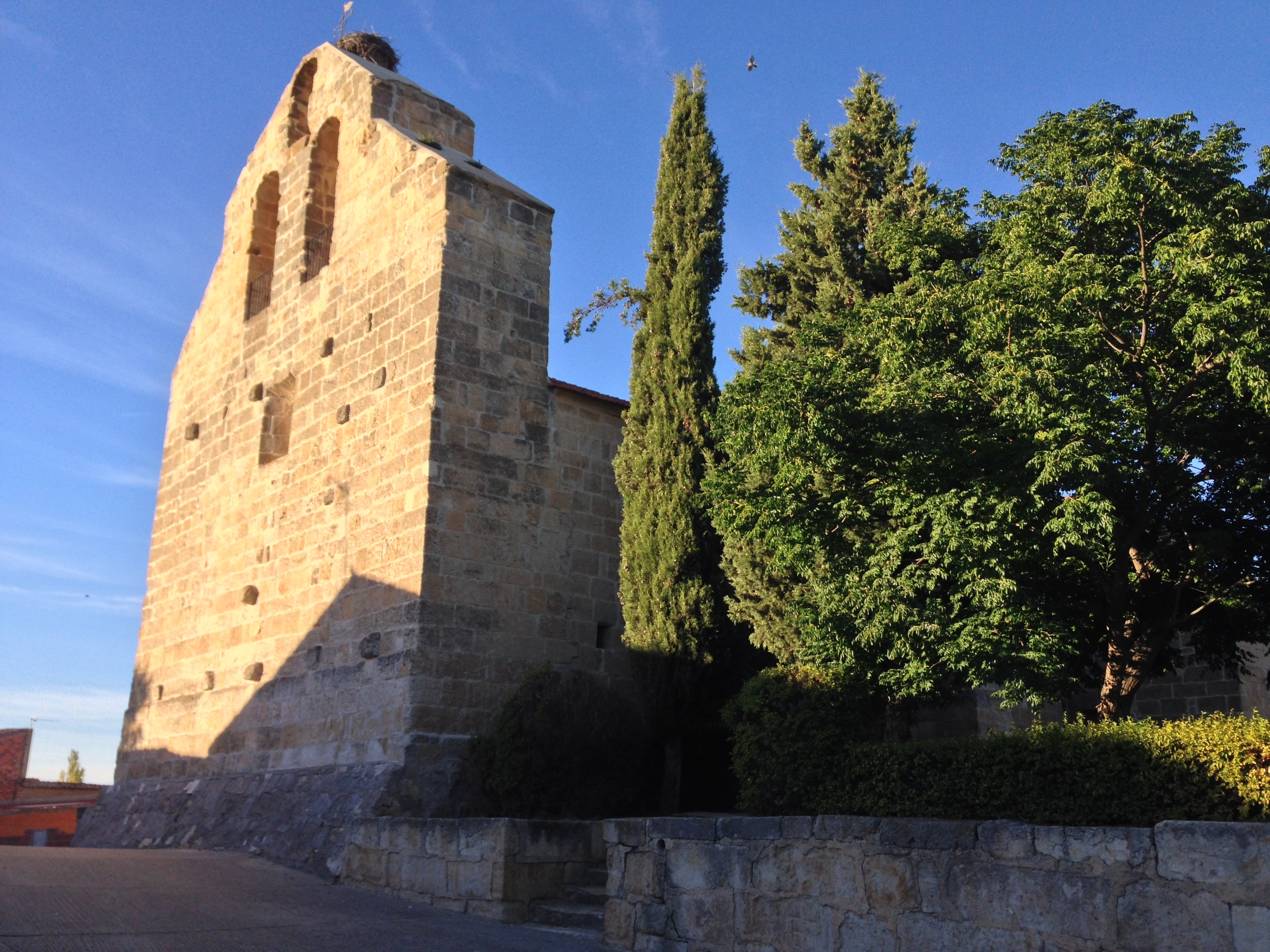

- Flag Coat of arms
- Interactive map of Santa Clara de Avedillo
- Country: Spain
- Autonomous community: Castile and León
- Province: Zamora
- Municipality: Santa Clara de Avedillo

Area
  - Total: 16 km^{2} (6.2 sq mi)

Population (2025-01-01)
  - Total: 153
  - Density: 9.6/km^{2} (25/sq mi)
- Time zone: UTC+1 (CET)
  - Summer (DST): UTC+2 (CEST)

Santa Clara de Avedillo is a municipality located in the province of Zamora, Castile and León, Spain. According to the 2004 census (INE), the municipality has a population of 240 inhabitants.
