= Villalba de la Loma =

Coordinates: 42°11′N 5°11′W

Villalba de la Loma, Spain
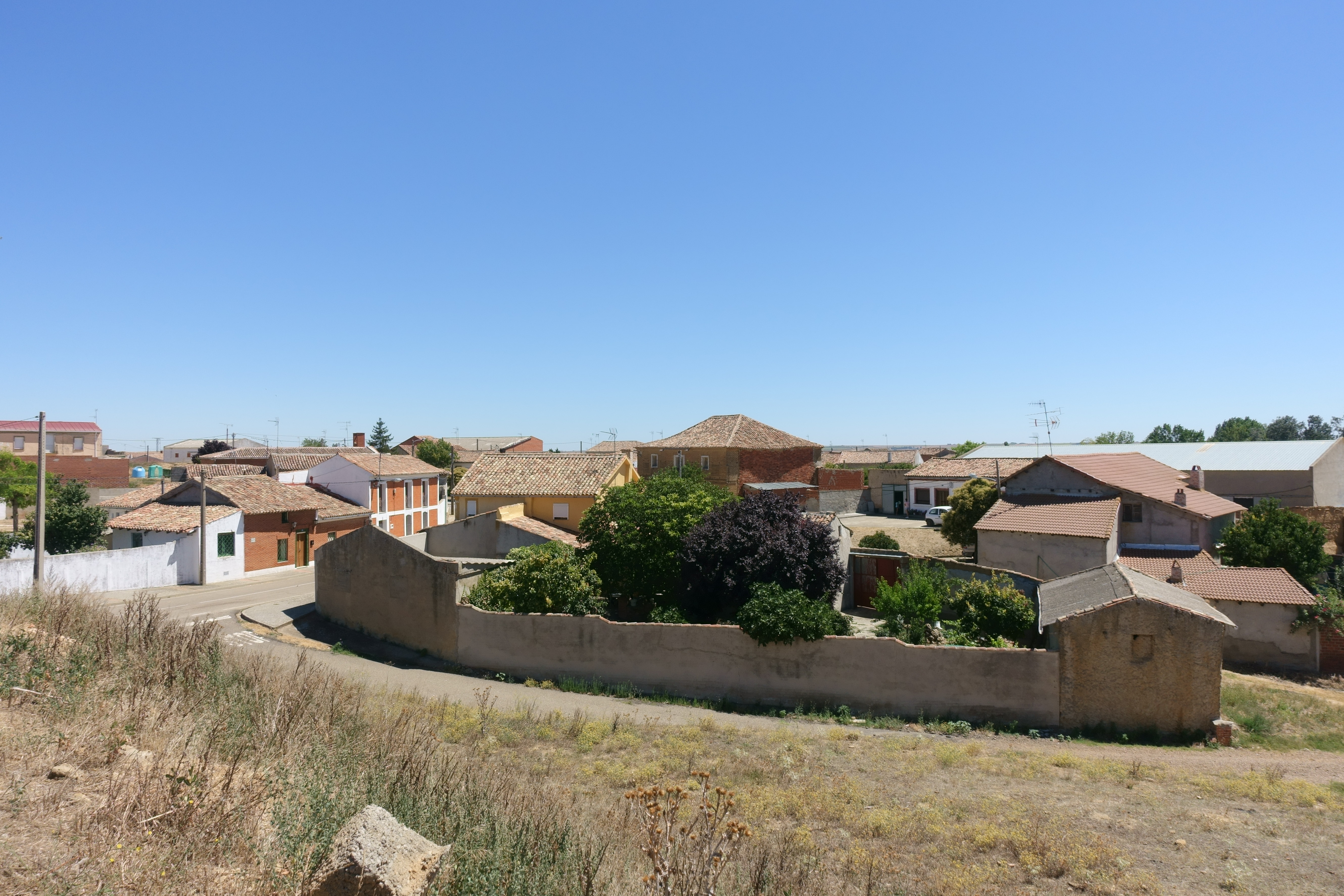
- Partial view of Villalba de la Loma (Valladolid, Spain)
- Interactive map of Villalba de la Loma, Spain
- Country: Spain
- Autonomous community: Castile and León
- Province: Valladolid
- Municipality: Villalba de la Loma

Area
  - Total: 14.06 km^{2} (5.43 sq mi)

Population (2025-01-01)
  - Total: 56
  - Density: 4.0/km^{2} (10/sq mi)
- Time zone: UTC+1 (CET)
  - Summer (DST): UTC+2 (CEST)

Villalba de la Loma is a municipality located in the province of Valladolid, Castile and León, Spain. According to the 2004 census (INE), the municipality had a population of 46 inhabitants.
