= Boadilla de Rioseco =

Coordinates: 42°11′N 4°58′W

- municipality
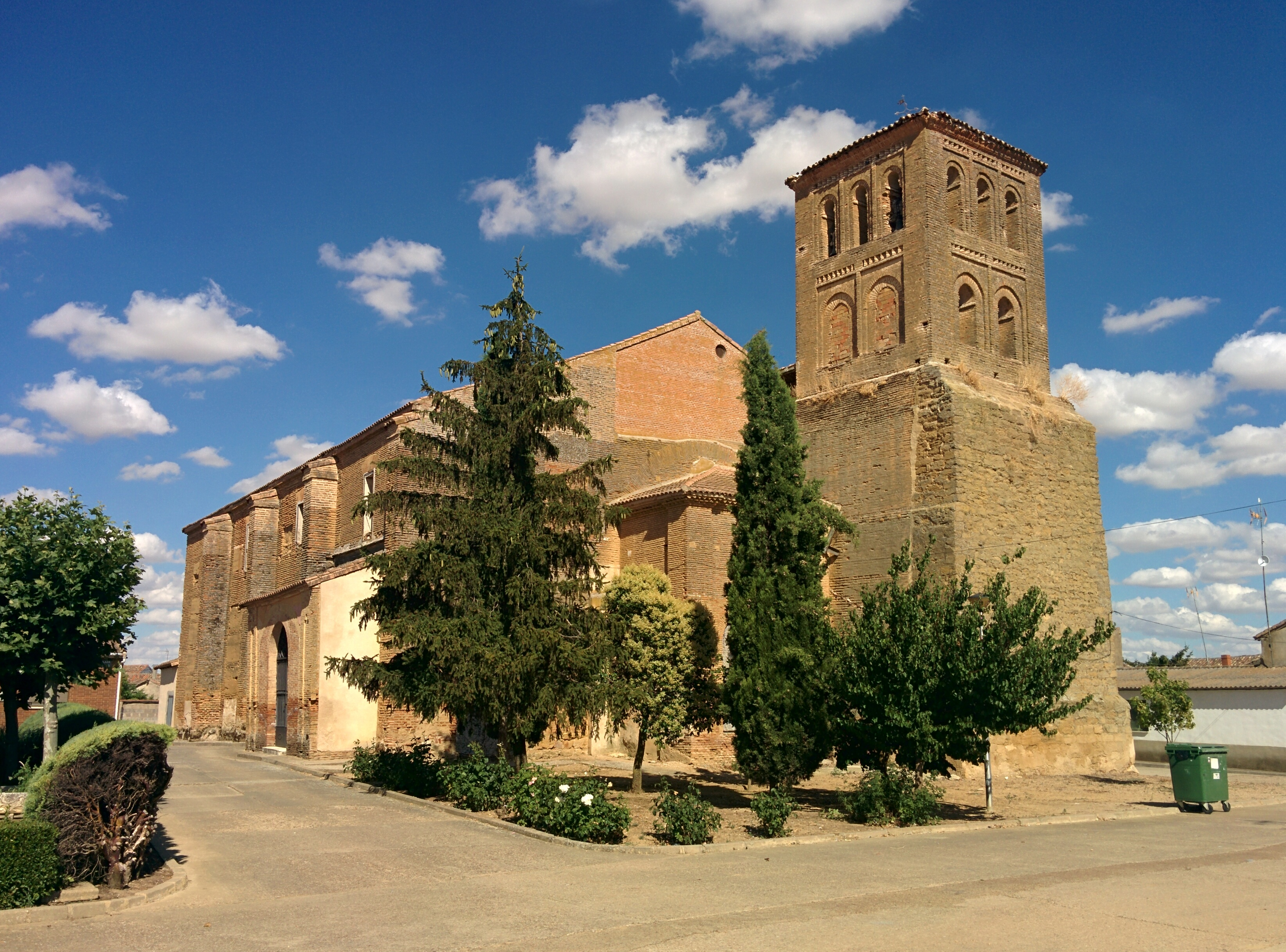

- Flag Coat of arms
- Interactive map of Boadilla de Rioseco
- Country: Spain
- Autonomous community: Castile and León
- Province: Palencia
- Municipality: Boadilla de Rioseco

Area
  - Total: 51 km^{2} (20 sq mi)

Population (2025-01-01)
  - Total: 95
  - Density: 1.9/km^{2} (4.8/sq mi)
- Time zone: UTC+1 (CET)
  - Summer (DST): UTC+2 (CEST)
- Website: Official website

Boadilla de Rioseco is a municipality located in the province of Palencia, Castile and León, Spain. According to the 2004 census (INE), the municipality has a population of 158 inhabitants.
