= Monastery of Benevívere =

Abadia de Santa María de Benevívere
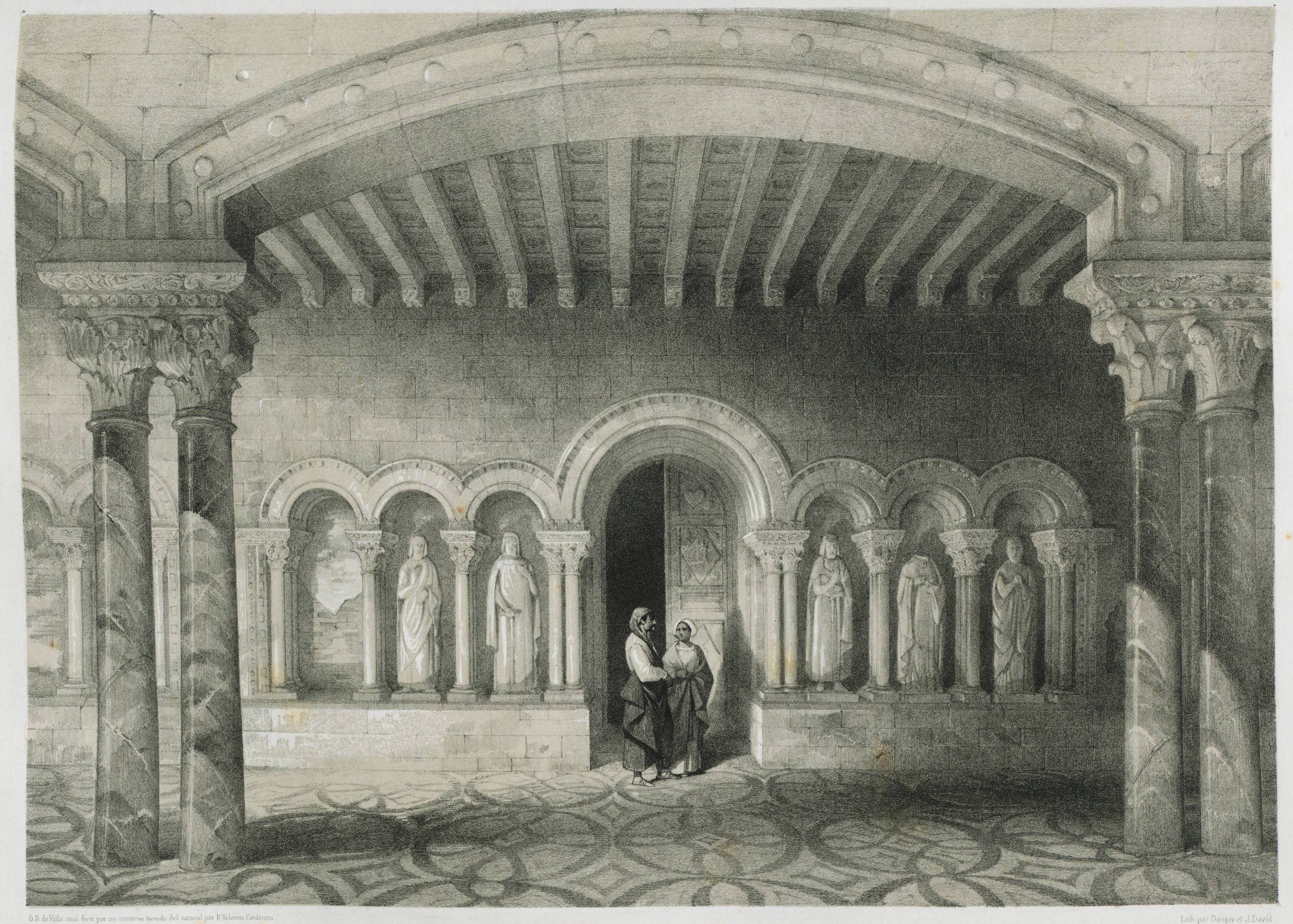
- Dans le Monastère de Bénévivere by Jean Charles Léon Danjoy (1841)

- Location within Spain
- Interactive map of Abadia de Santa María de Benevívere

Monastery information
- Order: Augustine
- Established: 1169
- Disestablished: 1835

Site
- Location: Near Carrión de los Condes, Spain
- Coordinates: 42.34°N 4.65°W

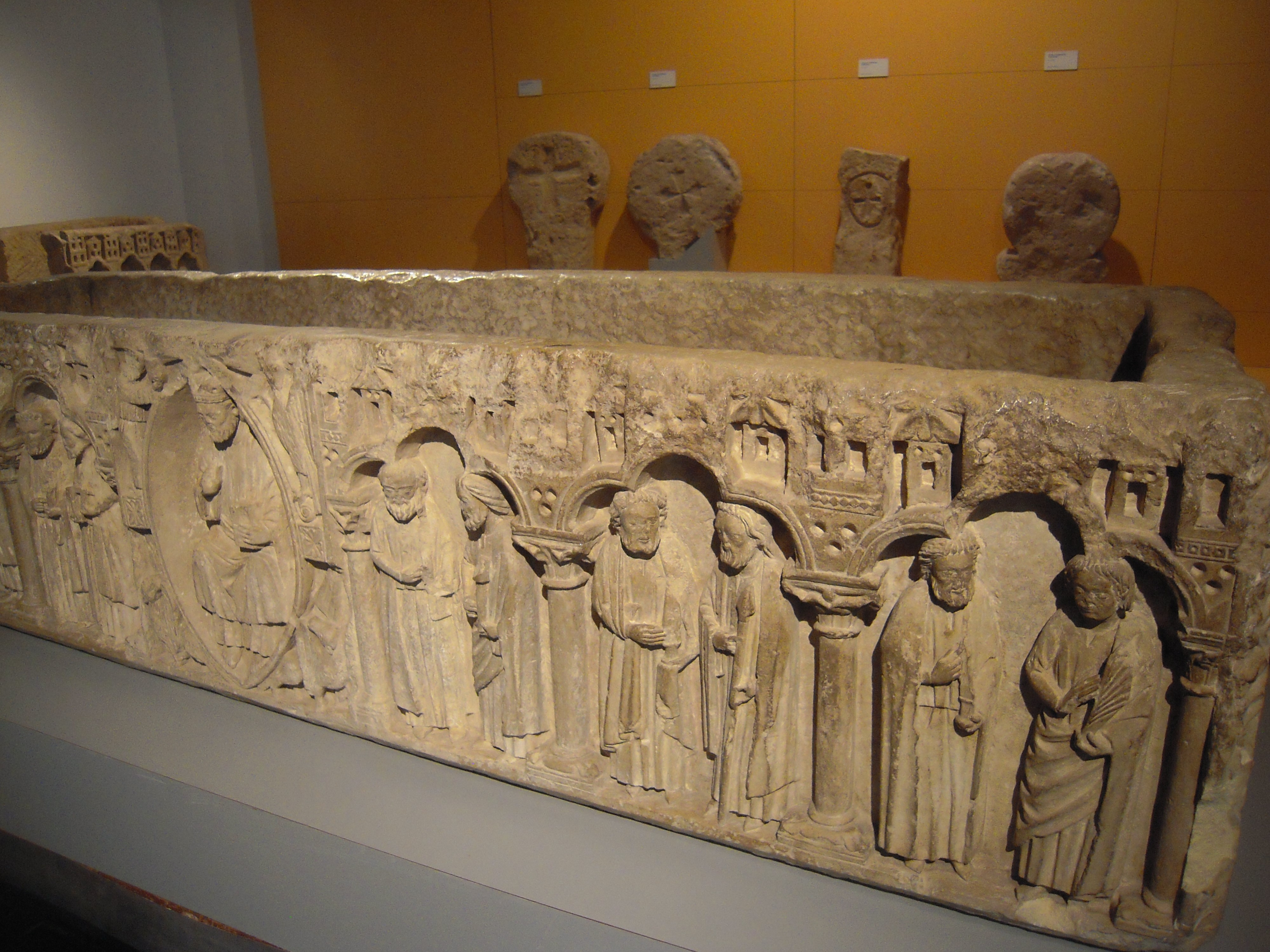
Gothic-style sarcophagus from Santa María de Benevívere

The Monastery of Benevívere (Spanish: Abadía de Santa María de Benevívere) was an Abbey in Spain, famous in the 12th century, now ruined. It is about 4.8 kilometres (3.0 mi) west of Carrión de los Condes in the Province of Palencia.

== Origins ==
The Abbey of Santa Maria de Benevívere was ordered to be built in the 12th century by Don Diego Martínez de Villamayor. He was a Castilian noble from the house of the counts of Bureba, who was very influential at court. He was the advisor of Alfonso VII and Sancho III, and treasurer of Alfonso VIII. After losing his wife he decided to retire and devote himself to the contemplative life. He laid the foundation of the Abbey in 1169.

The Poema de Benevívere (Poem of Benevívere) was written in Latin around the beginning of the 13th century in 758 verses. The poem tells the story of Diego Martínez de Villamayor, who aspired to be a saint, and King Alfonso VIII of Castile. It contrasts the religious and secular goals and ideals, and shows their intimate relationship.

== Activities ==
The house was occupied by Canons Regular living in community under the Augustinian Rule. It was approved by apostolic bulls of Pope Alexander III (1178), Pope Lucius III (1183), Pope Innocent IV (1284) and Pope Eugene IV (1483). The abbey also had two suffragans that followed the same rule, Trianos in León and Villalbura in Burgos. There were six dependent priories: Santiago of Tola near Ceinos de Campos, Vallodolid, San Salvador de Vallarramiel in Palencia, San Martín de Pereda near Riaño, León, Santa María de Pereda near Benavente, Zamora, Nuestra Señora de Mañino near Sotobañado, Palencia and the hospital of San Torcuato. The founder established a pilgrim hospital next to the abbey, served by monks, called White Hospital or San Torcuato. The abbey also served the farmers of the parish.

== Destruction ==
The monks lost their property in the Ecclesiastical Confiscations of Mendizábal of 1835. The convent was sold in 1843 and was almost completely demolished, despite efforts by Valentín Carderera and the Central Commission of Monuments to save it. Most of the monastery's papers are now held in the National Historical Archives in Madrid. Other relics are in a park at Carrión de los Condes and in various museums. A sarcophagus from Benevívere sculpted by Roy Martínez de Bureba y de Bame is held in the Palencia Museum. There are now only a few small remnants of the abbey at the site.
