= Mansilla Mayor =

Mansilla Mayor, Spain
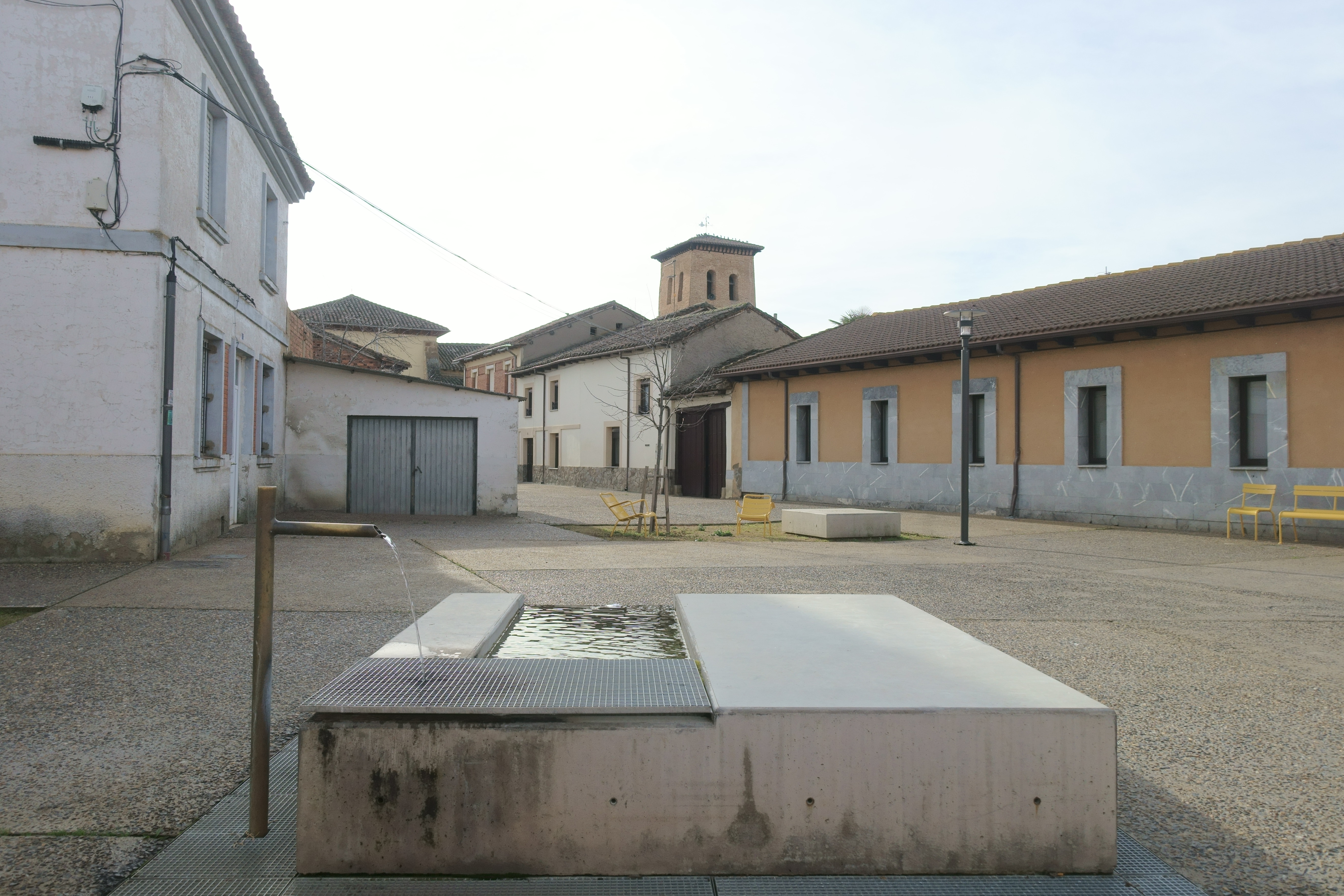
- Town hall

- Flag Coat of arms

- Location within Spain
- Coordinates: 42°30′32″N 5°26′31″W
- Country: Spain
- Autonomous community: Castile and León
- Province: León
- Municipality: Mansilla Mayor

Government
  - Mayor: Marcelo Fernández Olmo (PP)

Area
  - Total: 14.48 km^{2} (5.59 sq mi)
- Elevation: 790 m (2,590 ft)

Population (2025-01-01)
  - Total: 316
  - Density: 21.8/km^{2} (56.5/sq mi)
- Time zone: UTC+1 (CET)
  - Summer (DST): UTC+2 (CEST)
- Postal Code: 24217
- Telephone prefix: 987

Mansilla Mayor (Spanish pronunciation: [manˈsiʎa maˈʝoɾ]; Leonese: Masiella Mayor) is a municipality located in the province of León, Castile and León, Spain. According to the 2025 census (INE), the municipality has a population of 316 inhabitants.
