= Carrizo de la Ribera =

- municipality and town
- Coat of arms
- Nickname: Carrizo
- Location within Spain
- Coordinates: 42°35′6″N 5°49′53″W
- Country: Spain
- Autonomous community: Castile and León
- Province: León
- Municipality: Carrizo de la Ribera
- Founded: 1176

Government
  - Mayor: José Luis Martínez Matilla (2007) (PSOE)

Area
  - Total: 41.9 km^{2} (16.2 sq mi)
- Elevation: 873 m (2,864 ft)

Population (2025-01-01)
  - Total: 2,242
  - Density: 53.5/km^{2} (139/sq mi)
- Demonym(s): carrizano, carrizana, riberano, riberana
- Time zone: UTC+1 (CET)
  - Summer (DST): UTC+2 (CEST)
- Postal Code: 24270
- Telephone prefix: 987
- Website: Ayto. de Carrizo de la Ribera

Carrizo de la Ribera (Spanish pronunciation: [kaˈriθo ðe la riˈβeɾa]) is a town and municipality in the Province of León, Castile and León, Spain. According to the 2008 census (INE), the municipality has a population of 2,554 inhabitants. It is situated in the western bank of the Órbigo. In addition to Carrizo, the municipality includes the villages of Huerga del Río, La Milla del Río, Quiñones del Río and Villanueva de Carrizo.

According to traditional sources, the town was originated by the depopulation of two earlier nearby towns: San Miguel de las Ollas and Villar de las Ollas, which were devastated by fire.

== Main sights ==
- Female Cistercian Trappists monastery of Santa María de Carrizo, founded in 1176 and declared national monument in 1974.

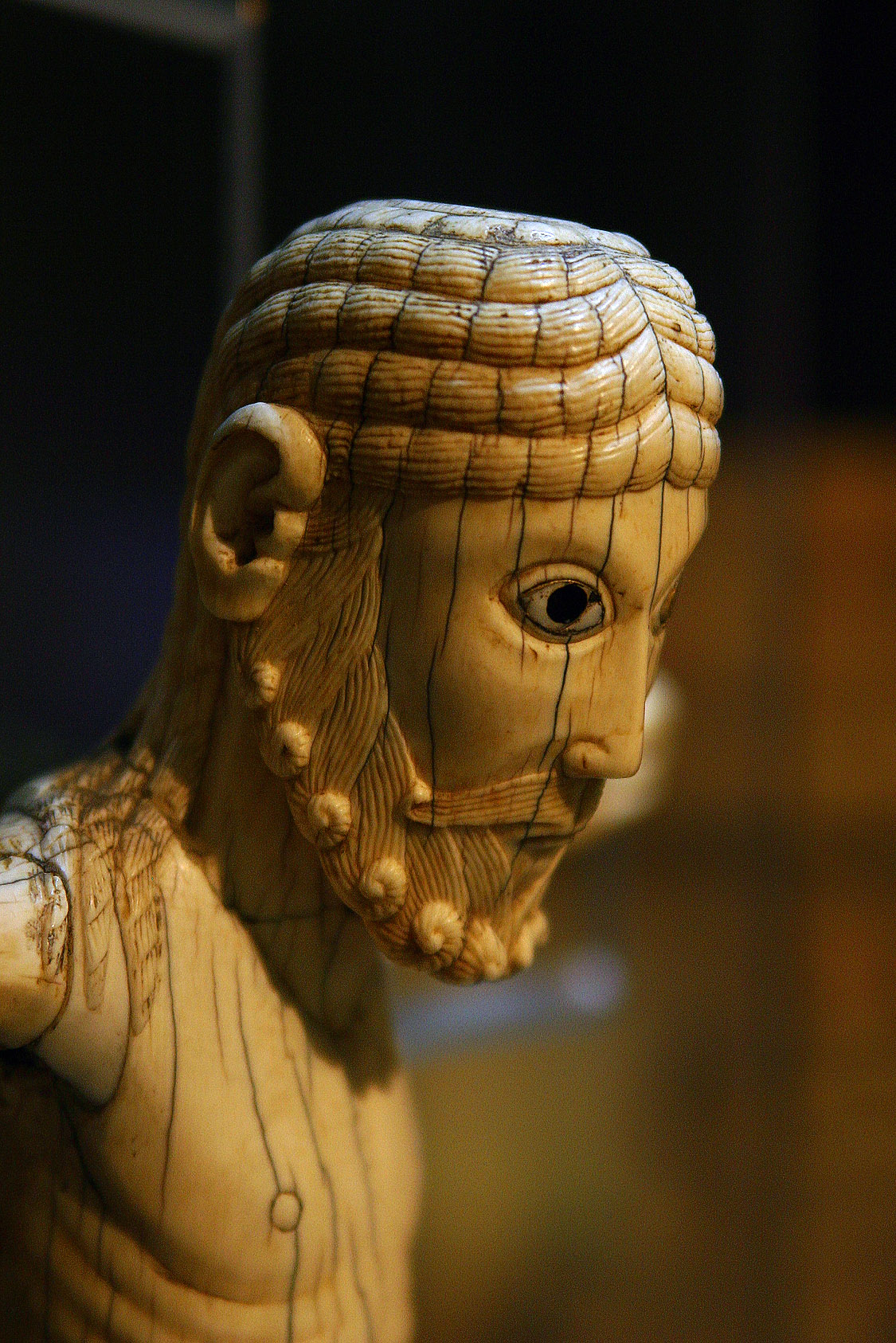
Christ of Carrizo (11th century)
