= Ponce Giraldo de Cabrera =

Catalan noble

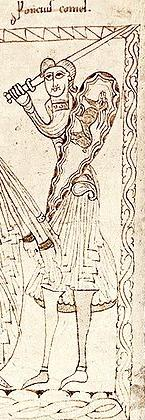
"Count Ponce" (the words above the figure are Poncius comes) as he appears in the Privilegium Imperatoris of Alfonso VII. He is standing to the right of the king, whose majordomo he was at the time. His shield shows a goat (Spanish cabra), which was probably used on the earliest canting arms of the Cabrera family.

Ponce Giraldo de Cabrera (floruit 1105–1162), called Ponç Guerau (or Grau) in Catalan or Pons in Occitan, (Note: In Ponce's time, Catalan was a dialect of the Occitan language, but by the 14th century it had diverged into a distinct language. "Ponce Giraldo de Cabrera" is the Castilian version of his name; "Poncio" is a Castilian variant.) was a Catalan nobleman, courtier and military leader in the kingdoms of León and Castile.

Ponce came to León in the entourage of Berenguela, daughter of Ramon Berenguer III, Count of Barcelona, when she married King Alfonso VII of León at Saldaña in November 1127. Immediately after his arrival, Ponce assumed a position of some importance in the kingdom. By 1143 he held the title of count (Latin comes), the highest rank of the Leonese nobility. By 1145 he had been appointed the king's majordomo, the highest official in the realm.

== Early career (1126–1140) ==
=== Catalan origins ===
Ponce was a son of Guerau II de Cabrera, the first viscount of Àger and Girona, and thus a great-grandson of Arnau Mir de Tost. His mother was Guerau's second wife, Elvira, probably a daughter of the Leonese magnate Pedro Ansúrez and his wife Elo Alfonso. Ponce was born between 1098 and 1105; he had two brothers, Ferrer Guerau and Bernat (Bernard) Guerau, both born before 1100. In his father's will of 1131, he was nominated as heir to the greater part of his father's lands and titles. Ponce succeeded his father in 1132 as Viscount Ponç II. By 1145 he had ceded control over Àger and Girona to his son, Guerau III de Cabrera. (Note: It was once erroneously believed that there were two Ponces de Cabrera: one in Castile and one, a brother or cousin, who ruled the family's Catalan lands from 1128 until 1145. It is now recognised that the same person was viscount in Catalonia and count in León–Castile.)

In the nineteenth year of King Louis VI of France (1126/7), Ponce witnessed Count Raymond Berengar III of Barcelona grant the guardianship (baiulia) of the young heir to the viscounty of Bas to his seneschal, Guillem Ramon II de Montcada. In the charter, Ponce's surname is given as de Capraria. There is a charter dated to 25 October 1122 in which Ponce, using the vicecomital title, pledges fealty to the bishop of Girona, Berenguer Dalmau. If authentic, this charter, found in the Cartoral de Carles Many cartulary, shows that Ponce was already sharing in the government of the Cabrera lands with his father as early as 1122.

=== Establishing a base of power in western León ===
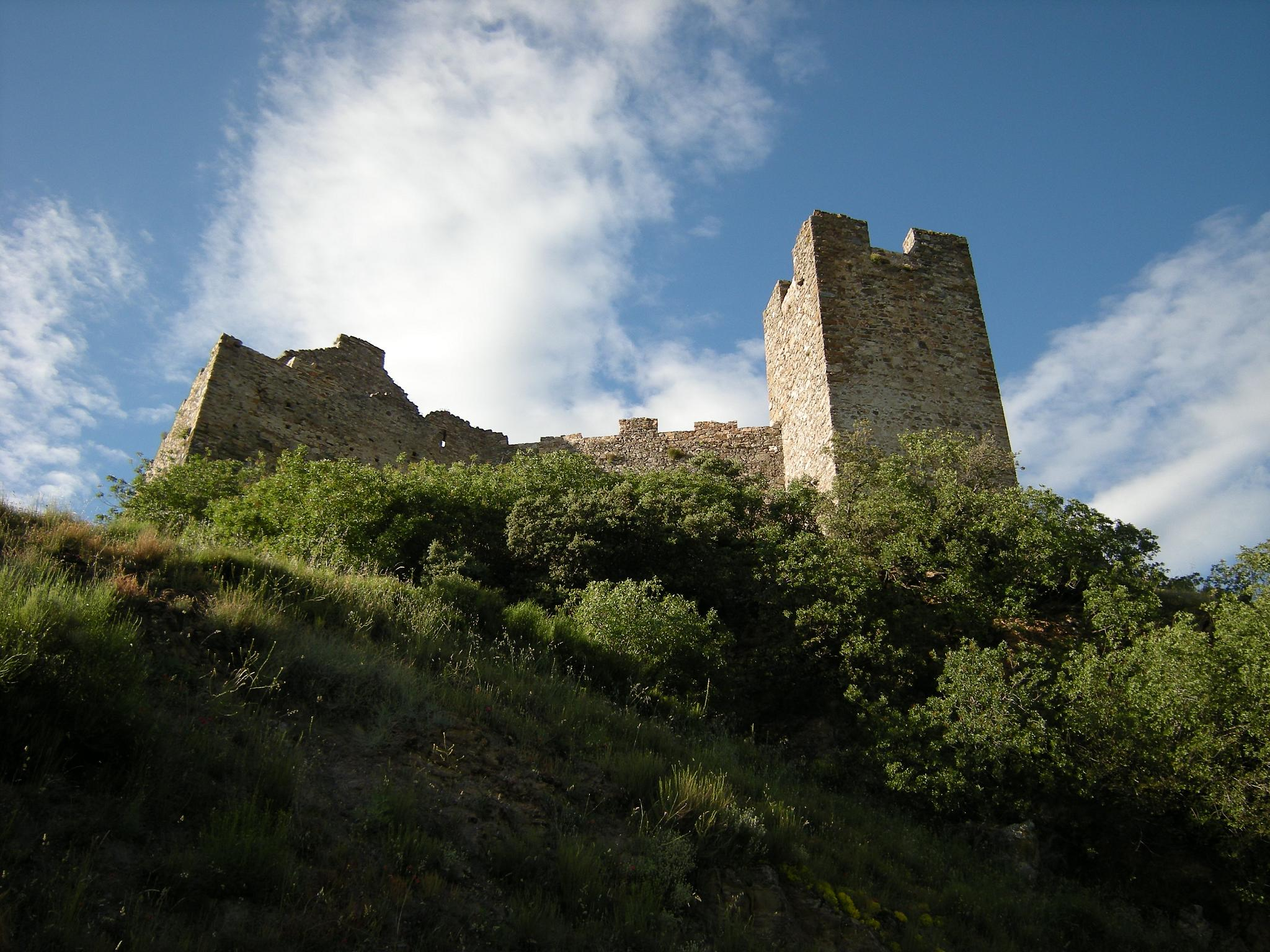
The castle of Ulver (Cornatel), the first command of Ponce in León.

The first evidence of Ponce's presence in the kingdom of León is the dating clause of a private charter dated 27 October 1128, which states that it was drawn up while "Ponce Giraldo and his merino Pelayo Peláez [were] ruling the castle of Ulver", that is, modern Cornatel on the southern edge of the Bierzo. This charter is preserved in the cartulary (tumbo) of the monastery of San Pedro de Montes, where Ponce seems to have been much esteemed—a charter of a later date refers to him as "the most noble Count Ponce". Ulver had been held by the powerful magnate Ramiro Fróilaz as late as May earlier that year, and by July 1133 it was back in his hands. It is possible that it was returned to his hold much earlier and that Ponce's rule was very brief. It was certainly only at the behest of Alfonso VI that an important castle in the region of one of the most powerful men in the kingdom could be bestowed on a relative newcomer like Ponce. Ponce later acquired lands in the district of Senabria, south of the Bierzo and across the Sierra de la Cabrera, where charters preserved in the cartulary of San Martín de Castañeda record two property exchanges he made in 1132 and 1135.

Some time earlier Ponce purchased some land at Covelo (now Cubelo de Sanabria) from one Pedro Bellido. On 31 March 1132 he sold the same land to García Pérez and his wife Velasquita for a breastplate, a mule and thirty rolls of linen. In August 1135 he more land "in the territory of Senabria" beside the river Tera to the same couple for a mule valued at fifty morabetinos and a horse worth eighty. Both these donations indicate that at the time "Ponce [was] ruling Senabria." His control of Senabria and the surrounding territory lasted until shortly before his death.

Around the same time, between 1129 and 1138, Ponce also came into neighbouring districts of La Cabrera and Morales, which had previously been under the lordship of Ramiro Fróilaz. Ponce later served closely with Ramiro on several military campaigns. The two even shared the tenancy of Astorga in 1154, and probably somewhat later that of Villafranca del Bierzo. A tenancy, known in contemporary sources as a prestimonium, feudum, honor or tenencia, was a piece of crown land given in fief to a nobleman who did homage (hominium) for it to the king. A tenant (tenente) was charged with raising troops from his tenancy in wartime and collecting taxes and administering justice in peacetime. In sparsely populated areas, a tenant was expect to encourage the settlement of his land. Tenancies were not hereditary and varied greatly in size. The tenancies held by Ponce "display a markedly military aspect", being mainly on the southern or western frontier.

=== Relationship with the royal court ===
Although Ponce benefited early in his career from royal patronage, he was at first "a fairly peripheral figure ... one among a large number of second-rate Leonese nobles who lacked the wealth and political clout of the great magnates of the realm." During the first half of Alfonso VII's reign, Ponce was rarely in attendance at the curia regis (royal court), where noble attendees "were expected to counsel the monarch in the day-to-day business of government." The first record of Ponce at court dates to 25 March 1129, when the court was staying at Palencia and the king made a grant to the archdiocese of Santiago de Compostela, witnessed by Ponce among others. Although he was at court still, or again, on 8 July, that was the last time before 23 March 1131, making his an absence of almost three years. During the decade of the 1130s his attendance at court was sporadic, marked by another three-year absence (28 May 1132 – 29 May 1135) and one of two years (2 October 1136 – 14 September 1138). In 1135 or 1136, he was in Catalonia again, signing a conventientia with his overlord and relative, Count Ermengol VI of Urgell.

The reasons for such prolonged absences cannot be ascertained with certainty today, but at least four possibilities are likely: poor health, the need to visit his Catalan territories, the demands of military campaigns elsewhere, or the loss of royal favour. In 1139 Ponce took part in the successful Siege of Oreja, where Alfonso reconquered the city from the Muslims. On 22 February 1140, Ponce was at Carrión de los Condes to witness the treaty between Alfonso VII and Raymond Berengar IV of Barcelona, which treaty is preserved in the Liber feudorum maior. The next year (1141), Ponce joined the punitive expedition Alfonso led against his cousin Afonso Henriques, who had proclaimed himself King of Portugal in contravention to a treaty he had signed with Alfonso. His presence in Portugal is attested in the Chronicon Lusitanum, which reports that he was captured at the Battle of Valdevez, and in a charter given by Alfonso at Santiago de Compostela on 23 September 1141. It is possible that the Catalan fought with distinction in these two wars in Andalusia and Portugal, since shortly afterwards he became a prominent figure at court. As a tenant (tenente) of the crown, he would have been expected to raise a contingent of knights (milites) and infantry (pedites) for the campaigns. In the fall of 1142 Ponce's relationship with the court permanently changed. He confirmed 376 of the 543 charters issued by Alfonso VII after that date, making him the most regular curial attendee among the counts of the kingdom.

== Prince of the empire (1140–1157) ==
=== Prince of Zamora ===
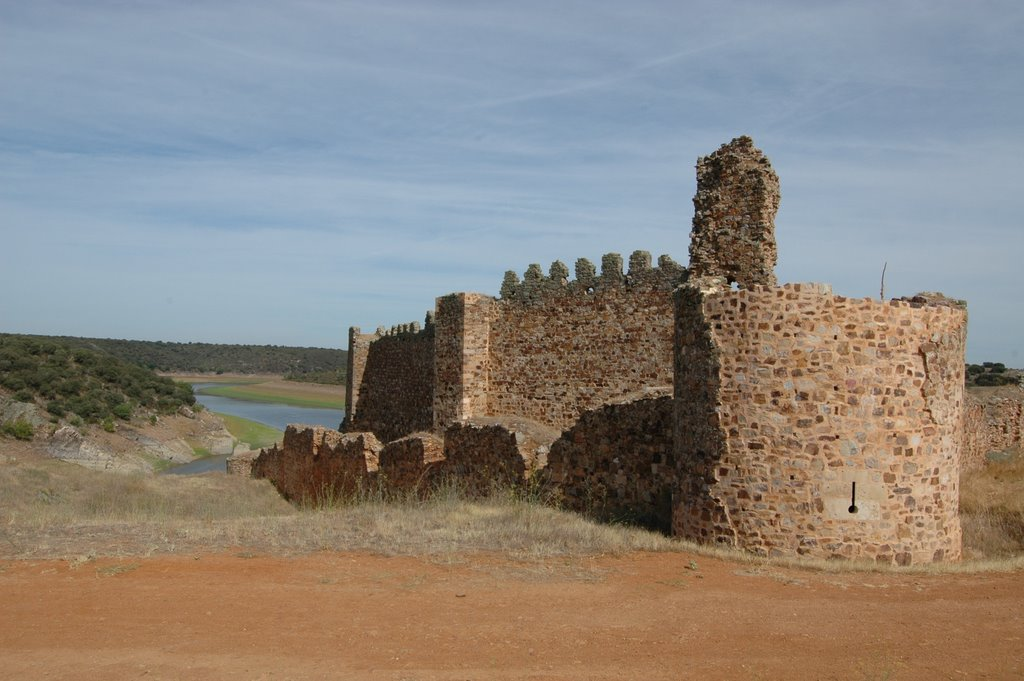
Ruins of the castle of Castrotorafe

There is a dubious charter dated 12 February 1140 that refers to Ponce as lord of Castrotorafe and Zamora. The former he is not otherwise recorded as ruling; the latter he is known to have ruled between 6 June 1142 and 6 November 1159. There is a charter slightly earlier, dated 5 April 1142, that refers to Ponce as "Ponce, count in Zamora" (Poncius comite in Zamora), but the use of the comital title is anachronistic, as there is no other evidence he held it before June. There is a more ambitious forgery in the purported fuero of Castrotrafe, dated 2 February 1129, which cites Ponce as "ruling Zamora" (mandante Çamora) over a decade before he is otherwise known to have done so. There is no other evidence of Ponce holding Castrotorafe in lordship, but he is known to have had close contact with the town.

The earliest clear and unambiguous reference to Ponce ruling Zamora and its district is in the list of confirmants (confirmantes) ofAlfonso's grant of the village of Fradejas to the Diocese of Zamora on 6 June 1142. This document, which refers to Ponce as "at this time prince of Zamora" (princeps eo tempore Cemore), was drawn up while Alfonso was besieging Coria and indicates that Ponce participated in that campaign. Zamora had previously been held by Osorio Martínez, the brother of Rodrigo Martínez, who had died at an earlier siege of Coria in 1138. At around the time of the second siege, Osorio became estranged from the emperor and his fiefs, which had previously been held by Rodrigo, were confiscated. Ponce benefited from his fall, for not only Zamora, but Melgar de Abajo in the Tierra de Campos and Malgrat (modern Benavente) between Zamora and León were transferred from Osorio's possession to his, by at the latest 27 April 1146 and 7 February 1148, respectively. Ponce was soon expanding his lordship in the Tierra de Campos: by 1146 he had the tenancy of Villalpando and by 1151 he had received Villafáfila.

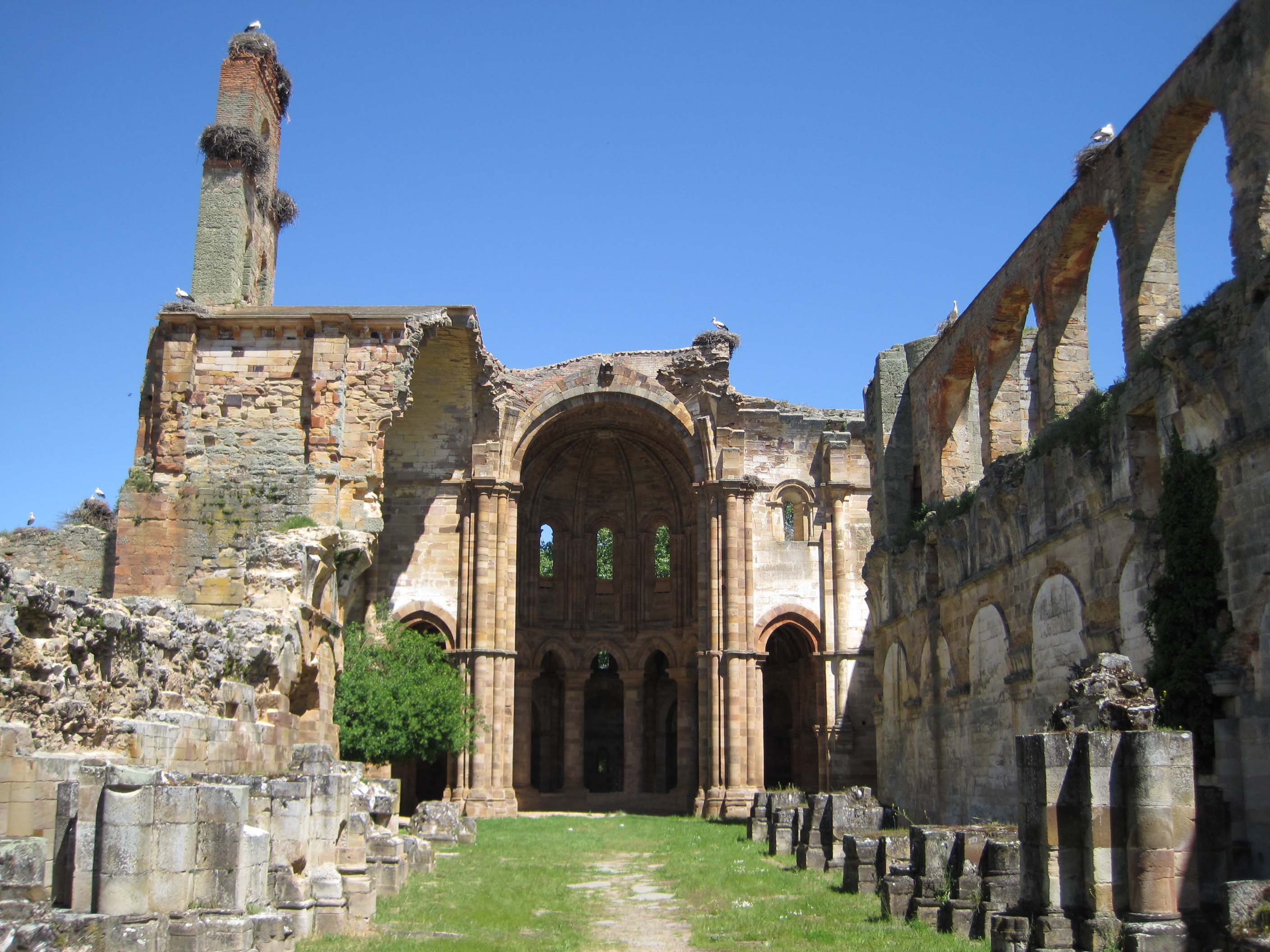
The monastery of Moreruela, founded by Ponce, became one of the richest in Spain by the thirteenth century, although Ponce seems to have paid little attention to it.

It is possible that Ponce received two other large tenancies in southern León at this time, Salamanca and Castrotorafe. The evidence that Ponce ever held the latter is inconclusive, but he had received that of Salamanca by 21 January 1144 at the latest and possibly at the same time as he was granted nearby Zamora. The Chronica Adefonsi imperatoris, a contemporary account of Alfonso VII's reign, relates how the Salamancas were defeated four times in the years 1132–33 before "they offered tithes and their first fruits to God, and [were] favored [with] the gift of valor and prudence while waging war, [for which] reason, subsequent to their prayers, they were a constant threat to the Moors in their own land under the leadership of Count Poncio, [fighting] several battles and [winning] great victories which included great spoils, [t]he city of Salamanca [becoming] famous for its knights and infantry [and growing] very rich from the spoils of war."

Shortly after the reconquest of Coria, but no earlier than 29 June, Ponce parted from the royal court and probably headed for Zamora. He was there when Alfonso VII visited on 5 October 1143, and gratefully bestowed on him the deserted village of Moreruela de Frades, located about thirty kilometres north of Zamora. There Ponce founded an abbey dedicated to Santa María for some Cistercian monks, probably the first of its kind in Spain. The original charter granting him the village stipulated that he should build a monastery there and "maintain and conserve" (manuteneat et conservet) it. On 28 July 1156, acting for the monks, he procured a "pact of friendship" (pactum amiciciarum) with the townsmen of Castrotorafe, and he endowed the Cistercians with more land, but there is no record of his favouring the monastery much beyond this. It was left to his kin and descendants to endow the monastery with lands throughout Spain and make it "one of the wealthiest houses in the peninsula" in the thirteenth century.

=== Count and majordomo ===
After the Emperor's visit to Moreruela, Ponce continued with the court as it moved across the realm as far east as Nájera, where Alfonso made a donation to the great Abbey of Cluny on 29 October 1143. This document is the earliest surviving evidence of a promotion which Ponce must have received during the previous three weeks: he was raised to the rank of count (Latin comes, meaning originally "companion[-in-arms]"), which was then the highest rank in the empire. In the charter of donation to Cluny he appears as Poncius de Cabreria comes. Thereafter, Ponce was a constant member of the court, which on account of its wide membership and its itinerant nature, winding its way through all of Alfonso's dominions, may be called the curia imperatoris (imperial court). Ponce's own "vast lordship ... snaked its way some 200 km south along the border with Portugal from La Cabrera ... down as far as the river Tormes" and included the cities of Zamora, Salamanca and Malgrat.

Ponce only rarely left the court throughout 1144, and in early 1145 he was appointed imperial majordomo (maiordomus imperatoris), the most prestigious office in the empire, to replace Diego Muñoz. (Note: Ponce's only absences from court during 1144 were on 29 February, when the court was at Arévalo, in October and November, when it was at Toledo, and on 4 December, when it was at Segovia. He was at court in January 1145, when he did not yet hold the post of majordomo, which he first appears holding in a charter issued at Toledo on 4 May. The last record of Diego as majordomo is in the imperial charter of 4 December, when Ponce was not present.) Except for a brief period in April–May 1146, when he relinquished the post to Ermengol VI of Urgell, Ponce remained majordomo down to the death of Alfonso, but it cannot be discerned from the sources that survive whether that post still included "overall responsibility for the organisation of the royal household" or was largely ceremonial by the mid-twelfth century. On one of Ponce's rare absences, Pelayo Curvo stood in his place as majordomo and confirmed an imperial charter (15 October 1146).

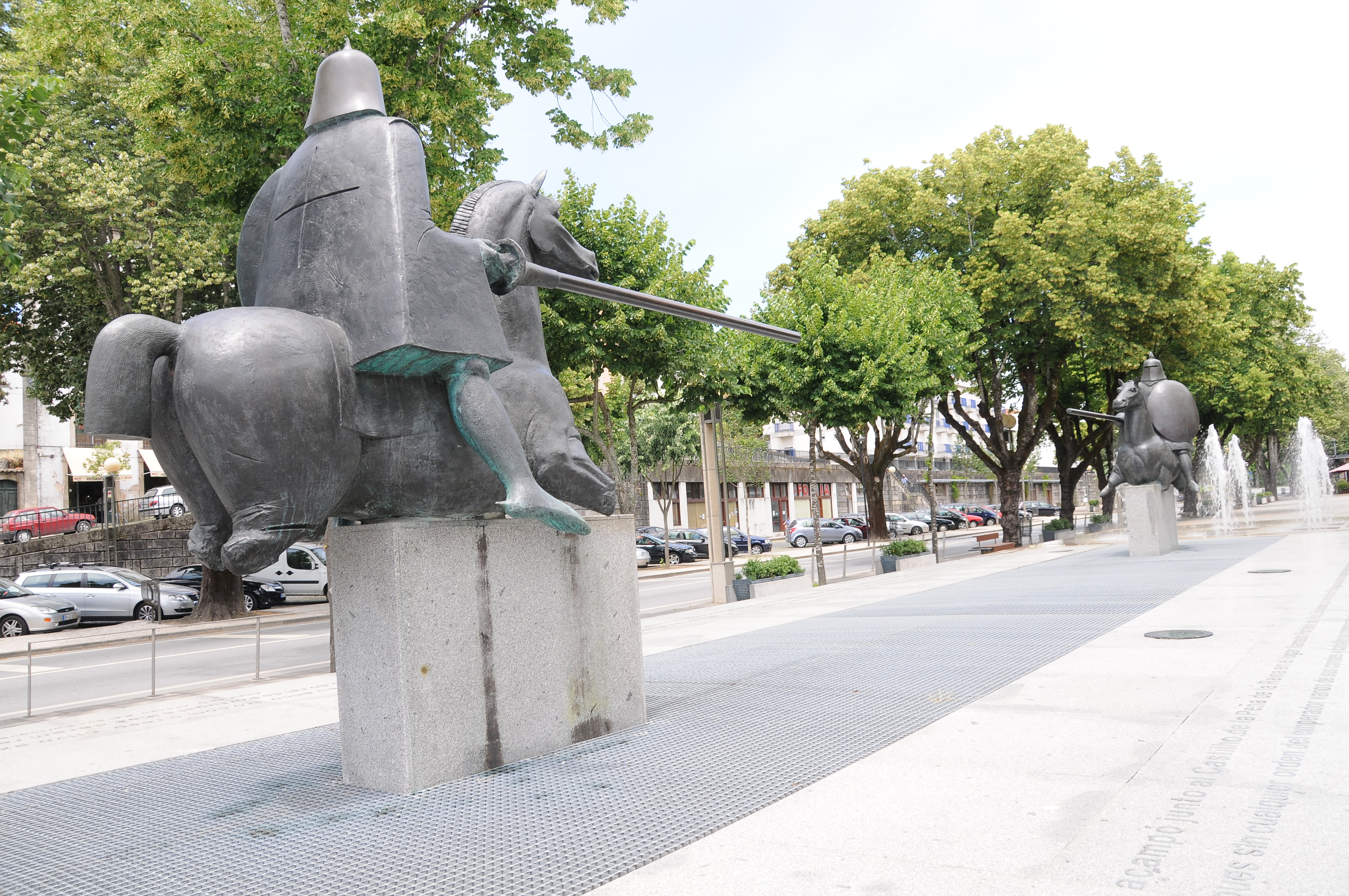
Monument in Arcos de Valdevez depicting two jousting knights. Ponce fought at Valdevez and was captured and held for ransom.

=== Military campaigns ===
Between 1146 and the emperor's death in 1157, Ponce participated in almost every military expedition waged by Alfonso. In April–May 1146 he was with the army that conquered Córdoba and raided its Great Mosque. He witnessed an imperial charter of 19 April, which was drawn up "after returning to the earthworks, where the above named emperor made the prince of the Moors, Abengania, his vassal, and a certain part of Córdoba was plundered with its great mosque." Early in the summer that year, Ponce, along with Manrique Pérez, Ermengol of Urgell and Martín Fernández, led the force that defeated and killed Sayf al-Dawla, a vassal of the emperor who had revolted, in the battle of Albacete. The Chronica Adefonsi imperatoris, which narrates this campaign, names Ponce before the other Christian leaders.

In January 1147 Ponce was present at the conquest of Calatrava, where he is attested on the ninth of the month. He was present with the imperial army at Baeza both on the journey to (18 August) and from (25 November) the successful Siege of Almería on the Mediterranean coast, and so his participation is certain. After the city was occupied, and a portion given to the Republic of Genoa, (Note: The Genoese bestowed their portion on one of their own consuls, Otto de Bonvillano, as a fief.) as per an earlier agreement, Ponce was enfeoffed with the imperial portion. He continued to govern Castilian Almería at least until February 1154. A contemporary Latin poem, the Prefatio de Almaria, probably by the same author as the Chronica Adefonsi, describes the preparations for the campaign against Almería with a roll-call of the major nobles participating. The section concerning Ponce is lengthy, with many allusions to classical mythology and the Bible:

Latin

Pontius ista comes regit agmina nobilis hasta.
Virtus Samsonis erat hit, gladius Gedeonis,
Compar erat Ionate, prcclarus uti Iesu Naue,
Gentis erat rector sicut fortissimus Hector.
Daosilis et uerax uelut insuperabilis Aiax
Non cuiquam cedit, numquam bellando recedit,
Non uertit dorsum, numquam fugit ille retrorsum
Immemor uxoris, cum pugnatur, uel amoris:
Basia spernuntur, certamina quando geruntur,
Spernuntur mense, plus gaudet dum ferit ense.
Dum quatitur hasta, mala gens prosternitur hausta.
Hic numquam mestus tolerat certaminis estus.
Dextra ferit fortis, resonat uox, sternitur hostis.
Cum dat consilium, documenta tenet Salomonis
Pro furcis enses mutat numerandoque menses
Escas ipse parat, per se sua uina propinat
militibus lassis, dum tollitur horrida cassis.
Mauris est pestis, fuit Vrgi postea testis.
Pontius hic consul fieri gliscit magis exul
Tempore bellandi quam linquat ense potiri.
Pro merito tali semper placet imperatori:
Pro uictis bellis ditatur munere regis
Omniaque regna domitat uirtute superna.

Translation

Count Poncio, a noble lance, commands the group.
He possessed the strength of Samson and the sword of Gideon.
He was equal to Jonas, illustrious as a ship of the Lord.
He was the leader of the people as the strong Hector was,
As generous and true as the invincible Ajax.
He yielded to no one. Never retreating from combat,
He did not turn aside his sword, nor did he flee to the rearguard.
Count Poncio forgets his wife and love when he does battle.
He rejects the table while war is waged.
Feasts are declined, for he revels more in wounding the enemy.
When he brandishes his lance, the evil race falls without strength.
He never suffers from the ardors of battle.
His strong arm wounds, his voice resounds, the enemy is brought to the ground.
When Count Poncio gives counsel, he has the wisdom of Solomon.
He prefers the sword to the feast. He himself calculates the months
And prepares the food. He distributes the wine
To his weary knights while removing his heavy helmet.
He is death to the Moors. Almería was later a witness to this.
This consul Poncio would prefer to be exiled
During the campaign rather than put aside his sword.
He always pleases the Emperor with such merit.
He is enriched by the favor of the king because of the wars which he has won.
Count Poncio overcomes all kingdoms with his supreme courage.

In 1150 Ponce took part in the imperial siege of Córdoba, and in 1151 in that of Jaén. In 1152 he was probably with the army that attacked Guadix and Lorca, because when on 5 September at Uclés the emperor "returned from Lorca ... in the year in which he had Guadix surrounded", Ponce was with him.

On 18 November 1152 Alfonso VII rewarded Ponce "my faithful vassal, for the good and faithful [military] service which [he] rendered me at Almería and in many other places, naturally in the provinces of the Christians and also in those of the Saracens" by granting him the castle of Albuher (or Alboer, modern Villamanrique on the Tagus) in the extreme south of his dominions, between Oreja, in whose conquest Ponce had participated in 1139, and Almoguera. In 1153 Ponce gained the tenancy of Toro on the river Duero in the region of Zamora near the border with Portugal, an important defensive position. In 1156 the town of Cepeda, seventy kilometres to the southwest, was attached to the tenancy of Salamanca. At this juncture his tenancies and personal estates were so geographically diverse and his power at court so great it has been said that he "bestrode the kingdom like a colossus". In 1155 Ponce fought at the conquest of Andújar, where he can be traced on 15 June.

== In the service of Alfonso VII's heirs (1157–62) ==
=== Exile from the court of Ferdinand II ===
Shortly before the death of Alfonso VII, perhaps aware of the impending division of his empire between his sons Sancho III, who inherited Castile and Toledo, and Ferdinand II, who inherited León and Galicia, Count Ponce relinquished the castle of Albuher at Villamanrique, in the kingdom of Toledo, which also fell to Sancho III. After the death of the emperor (1157) and the division of the realm, Ponce became a follower of Ferdinand II. He continued in his office of majordomo in the first year of Ferdinand's reign, and he attended the great gathering of all the highest nobility and clergy of the kingdom and the king of Portugal on 9 October 1157. (Note: This gathering confirmed the donation of Rodrigo Pérez de Traba to the Galician monastery of Tojos Outos of the village of Gomariz and the grant of some properties by the king to that same Rodrigo. All eleven bishops of his kingdom, the abbots of Antealtares and Celanova, and Ponce's fellow Catalan Ponce de Minerva were all present among the confirmants. The charter was redacted by one Petrus Gaton cancellarius regis (Pedro Gatón, royal chancellor).) Ponce continued with the court after it left Galicia, at least as far as Villalpando, his own tenancy, where on 13 October he confirmed a royal donation to Velasco Menéndez. This is the last record of Ponce with the Leonese royal court before he went into exile. He was almost certainly gone before the next surviving royal diploma was drawn up on 24 November. The reason for the exile is not clear, but according to the Historia Gothica of the thirteenth-century Navarrese historian Rodrigo Jiménez de Rada, Ferdinand II, generally "pious, merciful and generous", came to believe certain false rumours about Ponce spread by his enemies at court. (Note: Barton (1992), 255. Although Rodrigo attributes the exile and Ferdinand's displeasure to Ponce de Minerva, the latter's continuous presence in León is confirmed by the documentary sources, whereas Ponce de Cabrera's temporary exile to Castile is certain. It is most probable that the later historian has simply confused his Ponces. Even modern historians, like Esther Pascua Echegaray, "Hacia la formación política de la monarquía medieval: las relaciones entre la monarquía y la Iglesia castellanoleonesa en el reinado de Alfonso VII", Hispania, 49 (1989), 424, have confused them. Derek W. Lomax, "Catalans in the Leonese Empire", Bulletin of Hispanic Studies, 59/3 (1982), 194–95, completely intertwines their respective careers and notes that "the personalities, relationships and activities of these minor Catalan nobles are difficult to disentangle, but it is clear that they were extremely active in the politics of central Spain throughout the twelfth century, and that they built up their lordships primarily in the region of Salamanca and Valladolid.") In response, he confiscated Ponce's fiefs and those of some other noblemen, and sent them into exile. An even later source gives a different account. Ponce was exiled at the behest of the rebellious citizens of Zamora, who feared he would punish them for the riot which led to the death of Ponce's eldest son. This episode is known as the Mutiny of the Trout and its historicity is debated.

On 12 November, at Sahagún on the border between León and Castile, Ponce made over to the monastery his lands at Cisneros, at Cordovilla, and at a place called Villafilal, probably Villafalé. Four of his vassals—Rodrigo Pérez Pedro Martínez, Diego Pérez Almadrán, and his majordomo Martín Díaz—were witnesses to this donation and went into exile with him. Probably Ponce was preparing to leave the kingdom and wished to safeguard these estates from the royal grasp. His break with Ferdinand is evidenced in his diplomatic: his charter begins "I, Ponce, count by the grace of God", a formula generally used to indicate sovereignty or the rejection of vassallage. While visiting the monastery Ponce also settled a dispute over a certain estate at Melgar de Arriba with the abbot, who also claimed it. After arranging affairs in León, Ponce crossed the border into Castile and took up service with the Castilian king, Sancho III. His tenancy of Senabria was confiscated and given to Menendo Braganza, Ferdinand's alférez or standard-bearer (signifer).

=== Service to Sancho III ===
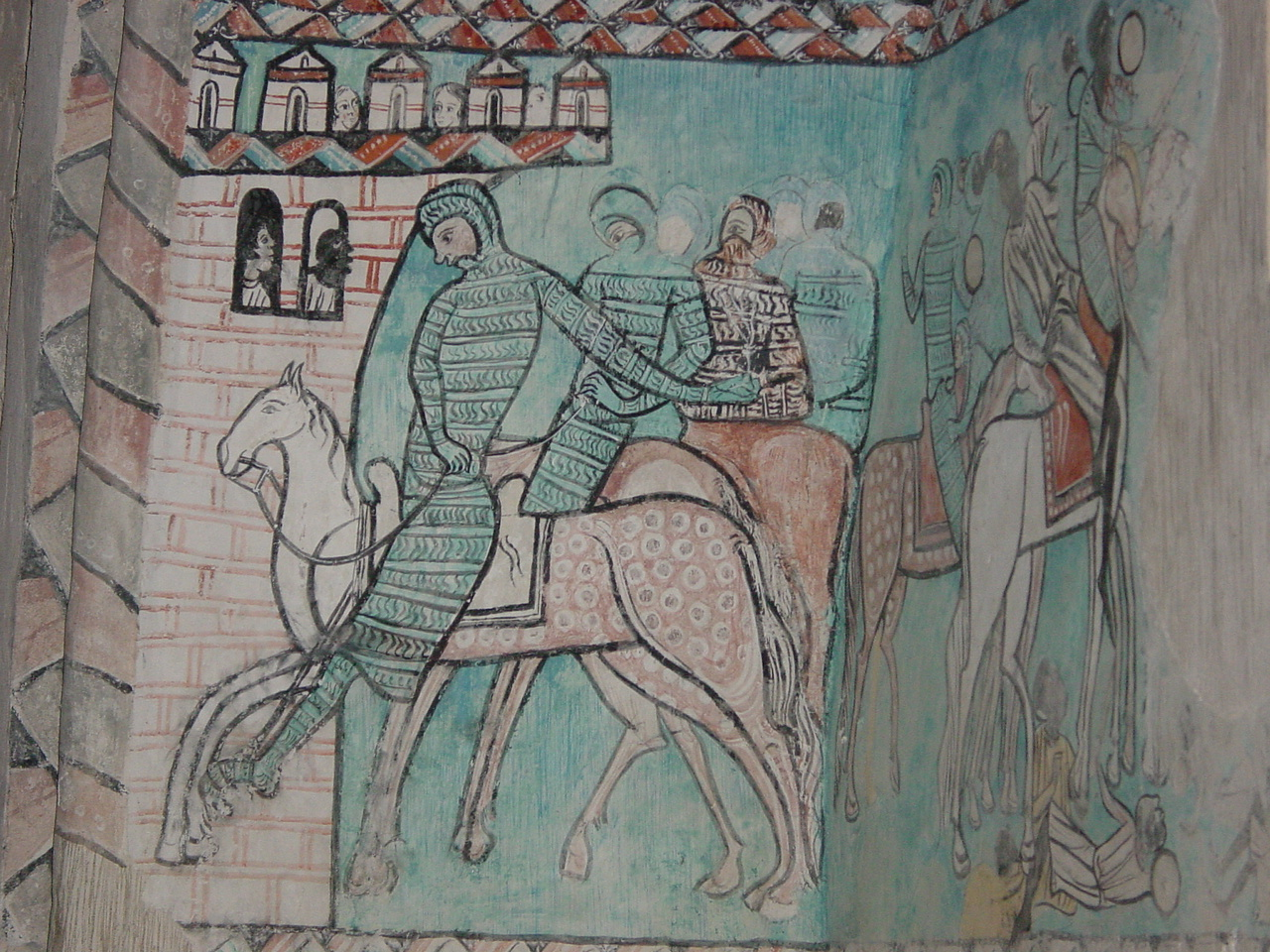
Knight depicted in a fresco on the wall of the "chapel of the treasure" in the monastery of Valbuena, where Ponce rejoined to the Castilian court after his victory over the king of Navarre.

Immediately after joining Sancho III, Ponce was set to work. He led a short campaign against Navarre, which brought the rebellious king Sancho VI to submission. On 25 January 1158 the campaign was over and Ponce had rejoined the Castilian court at Almazán on the Duero, where Sancho granted privileges to the abbey of Santa María de Valbuena and made sure that his scribe drawing up the charter noted that "king Sancho of Navarre [was reigning as] a vassal of the lord king".

In February, at Nágima, Ponce was present for the signing of a treaty between Sancho III and Count Raymond Berengar IV of Barcelona, also ruling Aragon. He continued with the royal court as it moved through Soria and Segovia and by March was at Ávila. There he left it and went to Sahagún. Sometime during this period Ponce and the other magnates who had gone into exile at the same time convinced Sancho to defend their claims against his brother. At Sahagún on 13 March, Sancha Raimúndez, one of the most powerful women in the kingdom, made a grant to the monastery of Santervás de Campos, and Ponce was among the signatories, along with Ramiro Fróilaz and Osorio Martínez and the bishops of León and Palencia, who may have been acting as intermediaries between Ferdinand and Sancho.

By 30 March Sancho III had joined Sancha and Ponce at Sahagún, in time to witness another donation of hers, this time to the church of Sigüenza of a mill at Toledo. Ponce remained behind when the royal court moved on to Burgos in early April, and thence took the Way of Saint James east to Carrión de los Condes in early May. Then the Castilian king decided finally to redress his magnates' grievances against his brother with military action and marched an army to the borders of León. There was apparently some fighting, but in order to prevent further bloodshed the two kings met at Sahagún, where, according to Rodrigo, Sancho said to his brother:

Since our father divided the kingdom between us, both you and I are held to share the land and its produce with our magnates, with whose help our forefathers possessed the lost land and repulsed the Arabs. Therefore, as you have returned their fiefs to count Ponce de Minerva [sic] and the other magnates, whom you deprived, and do not believe the rumours against them, I am returning behind my borders.

On 23 May the two kings signed a treaty of "peace and true friendship". This treaty stipulated that certain lands conquered by Sancho from his brother in the recent conflict were to be returned and held in fealty (in fidelitate) from Ferdinand. The treaty named three vassals among whom these lands could be distributed: Ponce de Minerva, Ponce de Cabrera and Osorio Martínez. Among those listed by Sancho III to succeed in the conquered lands if any of the above three magnates should die, four were the same vassals of Ponce de Cabrera who had entered into exile with him at Sahagún six months earlier. Ponce confirmed the treaty on the side of Sancho III.

=== Restoration in León ===
On 1 July 1158 a reconciled Ponce de Cabrera confirmed Ferdinand's grant to Rodrigo Sebastiánez, a monk of Oviedo. On 31 August Sancho III died and the regency of his successor, Alfonso VIII, was disputed. Ponce appears around this time to have returned to Leonese service, for he received back all his confiscated tenancies, including Senabria, and his former position as majordomo of the king's household. His second tenure as majordomo can be traced from at least 14 June 1159 until 4 July 1161, when he may have relinquished it due to old age.

Early in 1161 Ferdinand II began the resettlement of Ciudad Rodrigo and Ledesma, and he granted the latter in fief to Ponce, who in turn, again perhaps because of old age, bestowed it on his eldest son by his first wife, "Fernando Ponce [who was] ruling Ledesma under the hand of his father the count". While overseeing the resettlement of Ledesma, Ponce seized the church and gave it to the Knights Hospitaller. They in turn farmed it out to a knight who was living there with his mistress when the bishop of Salamanca, Pedro Suárez de Deza, complained to the Roman curia that "by violence count Ponce had stolen" the church. Although Pope Alexander III ordered the Hospitallers to return the church to the diocese, they refused and the knight did not move. The conflict long outlived Ponce.

=== Retirement, death and legacy ===
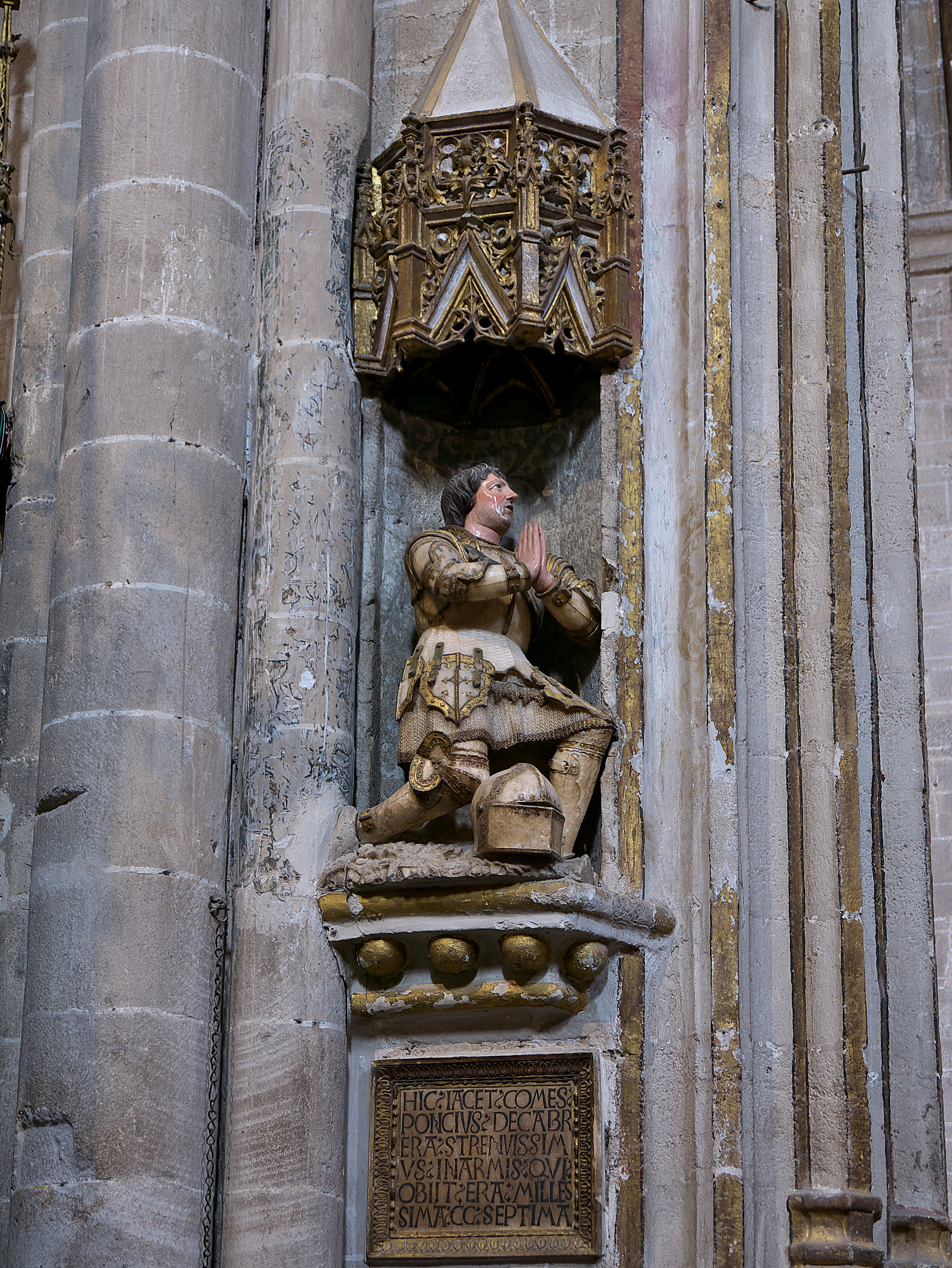
Sepulchre of Ponce Giraldo de Cabrera in the Cathedral of Zamora

For the rest of the year 1161, possibly due to failing health, Ponce relinquished his tenancies and began moving into a retirement. His last known appearance at Ferdinand's court came on 6 July, although no royal charter have survived from between then and 24 February 1162. His final appearances as lord in Senabria, Melgar de Abajo, Salamanca and Villalpando all came in this year. On 5 May King Ferdinand granted privileges to the monks of San Xulián de Samos, where "Don Giraldo, my beloved vassal, who in my service died, is buried." This was Count Ponce's son, named after Ponce's father. On 1 January 1162 at Zamora, Ponce himself made a donation to the abbey of Samos of certain properties he held in and around Sarria in Galicia "for the soul of my most cherished son Geraldo Ponce, who in this monastery of Samos rests entombed."

Ponce died shortly after his final act, his donation for his son's soul, and he was buried in the Cathedral of Zamora. In the fifteenth century a sculpture of Ponce, in armour and at prayer, was placed in a niche in the main chapel. On 25 May 1163 his surviving children made a joint donation to the canons of Zamora of a parcel of land at Villarrín de Campos for the sake of their father's soul. There is a seemingly authentic charter witnessed by Ponce de Cabrera as lord of Villafranca del Bierzo dated 13 March 1165. The count was dead by this date, and it appears the date on this genuine charter is incorrect. Ponce's death has sometimes been mistakenly placed in 1169. There is a street in central Zamora named "Calle Ponce de Cabrera".

== Private life ==
=== Marriages and issue ===
Ponce's first wife was Sancha, perhaps of the patronymic Núñez. She is an obscure woman whose family connexions are unknown. She gave Ponce two daughters, Beatriz and Sancha, and two sons, Fernando el Mayor and Guerau. His daughter Sancha married Vela Gutiérrez. In 1145, Ponce gave the government of his Catalan viscounties to Guerau (Giraldo), who immediately set to work founding the monastery of Santa Maria de Roca Rossa. In the same year, his mother and his wife, Berenguela (Berengaria), witnessed its foundation charter. On 14 July 1145, Pere Exavell, probably one of Ponce's Catalan retainers, drew up a will placing his wife and children under Ponce's protection. This is the last reference to Ponce as viscount in Catalonia; by 20 November his son was viscount.

Ponce's second wife was María Fernández, daughter of Count Fernando Pérez de Traba and Sancha González. They were married sometime before 26 March 1142, date of their donation of property at Pobladura del Valle to the monastery of Tojos Outos. On 16 August 1152 at León, the Countess María granted a fuero to the men of Castro Galvón. This charter was then confirmed by high-standing members of the royal court while they were returning from the siege of Guadix. The high status of Ponce's second wife, compared to the obscurity of his first, corresponds to his own increased status by 1142. María bore Ponce another son, Fernando el Menor. She outlived Ponce by at least six years, and on 13 January 1169, "detained by long and serious illness", she had her will drawn up.

=== Private estates ===
Ponce held extensive properties in the kingdoms of Alfonso, largely the product of royal patronage and support. He is known to have received direct grants from the royal fisc on at least three occasions (5 October 1143, 18 November 1153 and 30 July 1156). He probably also received royal land from Ferdinand II in 1158. There is a surviving copy of royal charter dated 18 October 1152 at Guadalajara, wherein Alfonso VII grants Ponce the village of Almonacid on the Tagus, but it is probably a forgery. In December 1155, Ponce and Fernando Rodríguez de Castro granted a charter to the settlers of their estates at Pulgar in central Iberia. Ponce may have received his part of Pulgar as a reward from the emperor, since his other major rewards in land for military service came in 1153 and 1156.

On 30 July 1156 Ponce received from the emperor the village of San Pedro de Ceque in Senabria. In Senabria, which he ruled until his shortly before his death, he also owned estates at Galende and Trefacio. He also owned land in his other tenancies, already mentioned: in Tierra de Campos at Villafalé on the river Esla and at Cisneros on the road from Sahagún to Palencia, near Zamora at Villarrín, and near Salamanca at Cordovilla. In Galicia, where he was less active, he owned property at Sarria.

As a leading magnate of two kingdoms, an important palatine official, and ruler of a large marcher barony, Ponce de Cabrera kept a large following of knights who helped him rule his territories and discharge his obligations as a vassal of the crown in time of war. One of the first vassals of knightly rank who can be glimpsed in the entourage of Ponce is Pedro Rodríguez de Sanabria, who was with him to witness the first donation of Ponce and María Fernández as husband and wife. At Toledo on 4 May 1145, "at the request of the Lord Count Ponce, whose knight he is", the emperor made over the deserted village of Calabor in Senabria to Pedro Rodríguez to resettle. On 14 May 1149 the emperor granted the village of Nogales to the count's son-in-law Vela Gutiérrez "out of love for the service which you have done me many times and are doing for me daily." These grants suggest that Ponce's landed estates were meagre in comparison to native-born lords, requiring him to rely on his suzerain to sufficiently compensate his vassals for their service. When the count's daughter and Vela founded a Benedictine monastery at Nogales in 1150, they thanked her father in their foundation charter for his "counsel and aid" (consilio vel auxilio) in obtaining the land.

== Notes ==
Preceded by Guerau II	Viscount of Àger and Girona; 1122–1132 (with his father); 1132–1145 (alone)	Succeeded by Guerau III
