= Rodrigo Pérez de Traba =

Galician magnate

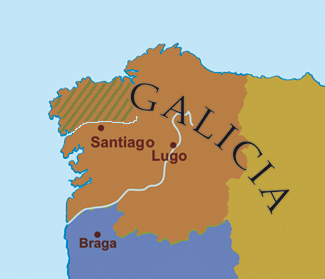
Rodrigo held castles both in the region of Trastámara (the land beyond the Tambre river, hatched) in the archdiocese of Santiago, and also along the southern border of Galicia with Portugal (purple)

Rodrigo Pérez de Traba (floruit 1111–1158/65), called el Velloso ("the Hairy"), was a Galician magnate who rose to prominence after the coronation of Alfonso VII as co-ruler of León in 1111. He served Alfonso at court in his early years, but was given increased responsibility in Galicia after the death of Alfonso's mother, Queen Urraca (1126). After about 1132 he became increasingly involved in the politics of Portugal, whose invasion of Galicia he supported in 1137. Even after León and Portugal made peace in 1141 Rodrigo was largely excluded from Leonese politics, with the notable exception of the military campaigns of 1147, until 1152. Thereafter until his death he was the dominant lay figure in Galicia.

== Political activities ==
=== Feudal affairs ===
Rodrigo was a younger son of Pedro Fróilaz de Traba and his second wife, Mayor Rodríguez. He is first mentioned in the Historia compostellana in connexion with the coronation of the young Alfonso VII on 17 September 1111 in Compostela. He took part in the ceremonies as the honorary alférez (armiger), alongside his father as steward. In the words of the Historia "the most esteemed count Pedro was royal steward and his son Rodrigo, as armiger, carried the sword of the king, the shield, and the lance." On 26 September 1119 he was still serving as alférez to Alfonso, then co-ruling with his mother, Queen Urraca. The post of alférez was typically reserved for younger nobleman in anticipation of higher office. In April 1126, after Urraca's death, Rodrigo travelled with his father and the other magnates of Galicia to Zamora to swear oaths to Alfonso as sole king. In the context of this episode the Chronica Adefonsi imperatoris refers to "the sons of Count Pedro Fróilaz, among whom [was] Rodrigo, who was later named count by the king." He was raised to the rank of count, the highest rank in the kingdom, on 2 April 1127, for he confirmed a royal donation to the Benedictine monastery at Sahagún that day as Comes dominus Rudericus Petriz in eadem die electus. Rodrigo's elevation to comital status probably took place before a gathering of the entire court in León. On 3 August 1132 Rodrigo and his brother Martín granted a family estate at Palacios to Pedro and Arias Díaz.

Among the Galician castles (castra) which the Historia compostellana names Rodrigo as holding are San Jorge, Traba (from which his family took its name), and a place called Ferraria (today Ferreira, a parish of Coristanco). These three castra are elsewhere called castellis by Alfonso VII in a donation to the Cathedral of Santiago in 1127, where they also appear clumped together. In the charter of donation Rodrigo is twice named "Count Rodrigo de Traba" (Comes Rudericus de Traua), a name used again in a similar royal donation in 1131. These are the only instances in contemporary documents of Rodrigo using "Traba" as part of his name. Sometime before 5 December 1135 Rodrigo was granted the tenencia (fief) of the Limia in Galicia, which he continued to govern down to at least 13 March 1156, possibly until his death. By 31 January 1155 he had also received the important Galician tenencia of Monterroso, where he can be seen ruling as late as 1 June 1157, and probably until his death. In one of Alfonso VII's last donations to the Cathedral of Santiago, in 1155, Rodrigo styled himself "Count Rodrigo Pérez of Galicia", the last apparent use of the title "Count of Galicia". One document dated 13 February 1147, but corrected to 1148, refers to his holding Salamanca, an important Leonese city, jointly with Ponce Giraldo de Cabrera, but this is the only citation of such a holding.

=== Military affairs ===
Rodrigo was politically closely aligned with the County of Portugal, which his half-brothers Vermudo and Fernando Pérez were de facto ruling through the latter's adulterous liaison with Countess Theresa. He regularly visited their court from 1128 onwards, even after the Battle of São Mamede liquidated his relatives' power. On 28 September 1132 as a reward for loyalty and service he received the vill of Burral from Afonso Henriques, Theresa's son and successor. At least between August 1132 and 26 February 1135 he held the lordship of Porto, and in 1137 he and Gómez Núñez aided the Portuguese when they invaded Galicia. At the time of the invasion the Chronica notes that Rodrigo "had fortifications in Limia and other commissions from the Emperor." From at least November 1140 until as late as 1 February 1141 he was the dapifer (majordomo) of the new royal household of Portugal after Afonso declared himself king in 1139. In September 1141 Afonso Henriques and Alfonso VII finally came to terms, and both Rodrigo and Gómez "paid a severe political price as a result." According to the Chronica, they "proved themselves disloyal to their lord, Alfonso. They handed their castles and commissions over to the King of Portugal [who fortified them and returned to his country]. These acts of treason resulted in their own ruin, for indeed they were what most prejudiced these Counts for the rest of their lives."

On only seven or eight occasions did Rodrigo pay a visit to the royal court between September 1141 and March 1152. During this period he continued to visit the Portuguese royal court also. Later, according to the Chronica, in a not unusual display of mercy, Alfonso invited the disgraced count to court and regaled him with gifts of gold and silver as he customarily did his regular courtiers, thus reconciling him to himself. In 1147 Rodrigo joined the royal army that marched to re-conquer Almería from the Muslims, but like many of the Galicians initially present he left in midsummer after taking part in the Siege of Oreja (at least until 25 July).

== Ecclesiastical relations ==
Sometime before 12 December 1155, at which time he was briefly governing Bubal, Castella, and Deza, Rodrigo had married Fronilde Fernández, daughter of Fernando Núñez and Mayor, daughter of Rodrigo Muñoz. She was thus a niece of Gómez Núñez. She gave Rodrigo a daughter, Guiomar, and a son, variously given as Álvar or Rodrigo. Guiomar married first Fernando Ponce de Cabrera el Mayor and secondly Diego Ximénez, by whom she was mother of Rodrigo Díaz de los Cameros. Fronilde was a generous benefactress of the Cistercians in Spain, making donations to their foundations at Armenteira, Ferreira de Pallares, Meira, and Melón. In 1175 she made a donation to San Martiño de Fóra and helped found a convent at Ferreira de Pantón, which she placed in dependency on Meira.

While his wife's religious devotion favoured the Cistercians, Rodrigo's patronage lay solidly behind the Benedictines and the Praemonstratensians. On 20 December 1127 Alfonso VII donated some churches to the Benedictine monastery of Cines in Galicia "for the love of our most faithful count Don Rodrigo Pérez." The surviving charter recording this grant of largesse has been challenged as a forgery by at least one historian, but its authenticity has been defended by another. It contains the date 1133, but the list of witnesses suggests it more probably belongs to 1127. It names Rodrigo Martínez as a count, but he cannot be shown to have attained that rank before late 1128. On 28 October 1155 Rodrigo confirmed a royal donation of property to the abbey of Santo Domingo de Silos. On 15 December he made donations to the Praemonstratensian monasteries of Retuerta and San Leonardo.

According to the Historia compostellana, in 1130 some of Rodrigo's knights unlawfully imprisoned Arias Muñiz, the archdeacon of Trastámara in the Archdiocese of Santiago de Compostela. When the archbishop Diego Gelmírez threatened to excommunicate Rodrigo, the count swore on the Gospels that he had no part in his knights' actions, that he would confiscate the fiefs he had bestowed on those knights, and that he would arrest and hand over to the diocese any peasants who had taken part in the outrage. The purpose of the public humiliation imposed by Diego was, according to the Historia, to instill fear in Rodrigo's fellow magnates, so that they would not dare commit such acts again. For the remission of his sins, Rodrigo made a donation to the archdiocese of his castle at Faro. Alfonso VII's gift of the tenencia of the Limia towards 1135 was probably motivated by Rodrigo's good relations with Diego. The Historia also describes how Alfonso VII granted the castle of San Jorge and its dependencies to the archdiocese, but allowed Rodrigo to retain its lordship as a vassal of the archbishop.

Rodrigo also donated to the Cathedral of Braga on 28 October 1133. On 1 March 1143 and again twelve years later, on 20 March 1155, he made donations to the Benedictines of Sobrado dos Monxes, which had been founded by his half-brothers. His last recorded act of piety was a donation to the Benedictine establishment at Toxos Outos on 9 October 1157. According to one source he is last mentioned on 28 August 1158 in a document of the tumbo (cartulary) of the monastery of Castañeda, but another cites a document in the archive of Sobrado dated 24 December 1165, placing his death in early 1166.
