= Treaty of Sahagún (1158) =

1158 treaty between Castile and León

The Treaty of Sahagún ended a state of war between the Castile and León, establishing pacem et ueram amiciciam (peace and true friendship) between their respective monarchs, Sancho III and Ferdinand II, who called themselves boni fratres et boni amici (good brothers and good friends). It was signed at the monastery of Sahagún on 23 May 1158.

On the death of Alfonso VII (21 August 1157) his realms were partitioned between his two sons: Castile, with Toledo to the eldest, and León, with Galicia, to the younger one. According to Rodrigo Jiménez de Rada, this division was instigated by the factitious Manrique Pérez de Lara of Castile and Fernando Pérez de Traba of León, who, the historian says, "aimed to sow the seed of discord thereby." According to Rodrigo, Ferdinand II, in response to calumnious accusations at court, confiscated the fiefs of some of his leading magnates, who then went into exile at the court of Sancho III, seeking redress. The Castilian king marched on army on León, but Ferdinand arranged to meet him at Sahagún and a peace was negotiated. The documentary sources do not provide a clear chronology of the exile of any magnates, although it is known to have occurred. Later sources connected these events with the (probably legendary) Mutiny of the Trout.

The Treaty of Sahagún put an end to the quarrel. It stipulated that Sancho should return the seized lands to his brother, but also that they should be held in fidelitate (in fealty) from Ferdinand by three counts: Ponce Giraldo de Cabrera, Osorio Martínez, and Ponce de Minerva. If either party ignored his treaty obligations the lands reverted to the other after a year, save those bestowed on Osorio, who secured hereditary rights. The other counts could only be succeeded, in the event of death, by their sons or by certain other noblemen stipulated by the treaty.

Sancho and Ferdinand also agreed to aid one another militarily against any enemy save their uncle, Raymond Berengar IV, Prince of Aragon. They also agreed not to enter into any alliances with King Afonso I of Portugal. The treaty further divided Portugal between them—in the event of its conquest—and divided al-Andalus into respective zones of reconquista. León received the right to conquer the regions of the cities of Niebla, Montánchez, Mérida, Badajoz, Évora, Mértola, and Silves, an extension of the Vía de la Plata to the sea by Lisbon. This allotment appears in hindsight severely limiting to León, but which would not have seemed that way at the time. The most important part of the treaty declared that if either king should die, his kingdom was to pass to the other. Ferdinand named Ramiro Fróilaz, Pedro Alfonso, Ponce de Minerva and Abril as guarantors of his faith. There forty other lay and clerical confirmants, including Sancha Raimúndez, styled regina (queen), the brothers' aunt, and four bishops (of, in order of precedence, Palencia, Zamora, Astorga, and León). Thirty-three lay noblemen also subscribed, in one of two lists depending on their kingdom. Notably, while Ponce de Minerva is named among those who ex parte regis Fernandi iuraument (of the part of King Ferdinand swore the oath), Ponce de Cabrera is listed among the Castilians, probably an exile from León.

Sancho III died on 31 August and Ferdinand promptly made a claim on Castile and occupied some territories, while the Castilian aristocracy descended into a civil war for control of Sancho's heir, Alfonso VIII.
