= Pelayo Curvo =

Pelayo Curvo was a Galician nobleman active between 1128 and 1173.

== Family ==
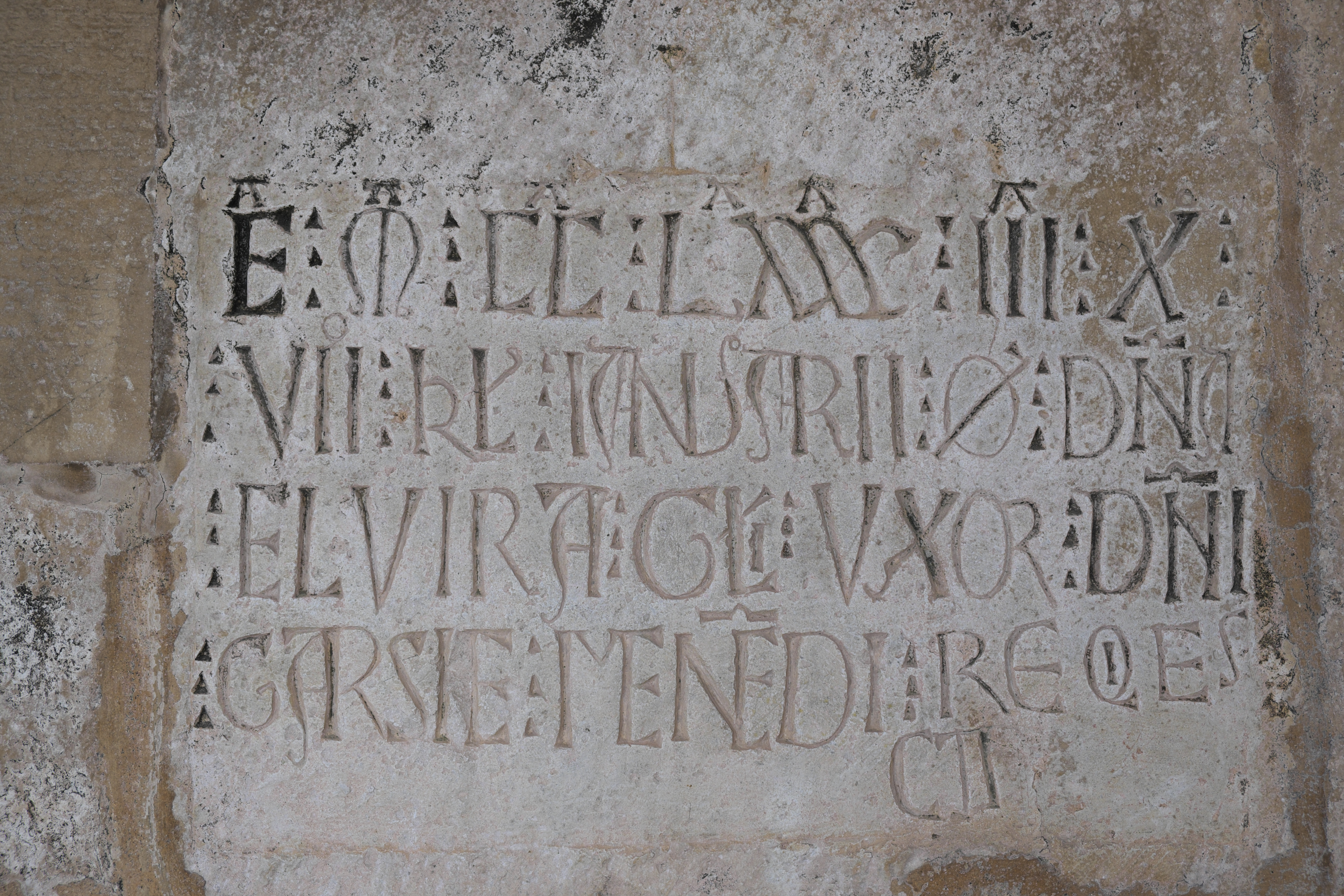
Tombstone of Pelayo's granddaughter, Elvira González in Alcobaça

Pelayo was a son of Fernando Yáñez. His wife was María Garcés. In the Livro Velho de Linhagens, she is called María Marañón. According to the Historia Compostellana, she was a niece of Archbishop Diego Gelmírez. Together they had four children: Gonzalo Páes, Sancha Páes, María Páes and Teresa Páes. According to the Livro de Linhagens of Pedro de Barcelos, the troubadour Pedro Rodríguez de Palmeira died of love for María Páes.

== Career ==
Pelayo is traceable in the historical record from 1128, when he was serving as the archbishop's merino. In that year, García Pérez de Traba and his followers robbed some merchants who had come to Padrón from England and Lotharingia to sell their wares in the market of Santiago de Compostela. According to the Historia Compostellana, the archbishop sent Pelayo at the head of a group of soldiers to recover the loot. The robbers were confronted in the mountains, defeated in combat and the loot recovered and restored to the merchants.

Pelayo remained loyal to King Alfonso VII of León after the Portugal rebelled. He was probably the anonymous merino deputed by Diego Gelmírez to lead Galician forces against the rebels in the early 1130s, according to the Historia Compostellana. In 1137, he took part in the recapture of Tui. He was also present at the siege of Oreja in 1139. In 1141, during a visit to Compostela, Alfonso VII found Pelayo to have violently seized some property of the monastery of San Martiño Pinario and ordered him to restore it.

Pelayo witnessed his first royal charter in May 1133. He never regularly attended the royal court and, until 1155, he almost never attended without his father. After 1155, he generally appeared only on major occasions when the itinerant court was in the north of the kingdom. When his father was granted tenancies in the south of the kingdom in the 1140s, Pelayo was given his Galician tenancies. By 1149, he was tenant of region around Tui and by 1152 also of Toroño. He mostly resided in these tenancies, which were on the border with Portugal.

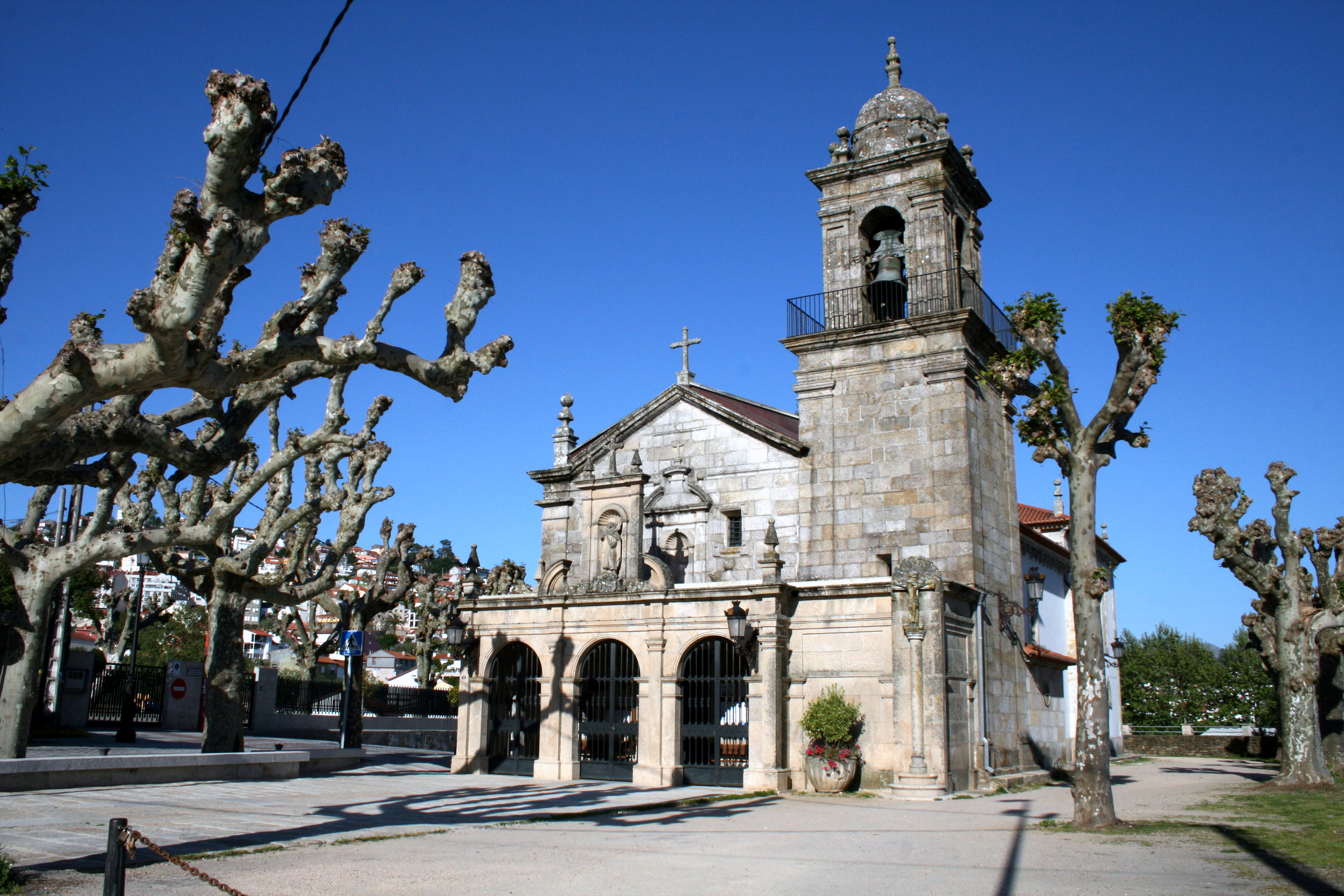
Santa Cristina de Lavadores today

In 1140, Pelayo referred a dispute brought before him as lord by the nuns of San Pedro de Ramiranes and the knight Álvaro Rubeo to the royal court at Salamanca. In September 1141 at Santiago de Compostela, Alfonso VII adjudicated a dispute between Pelayo and the monastery of San Martiño Pinario. In October 1146 at Tudején, Pelayo, acting as majordomo "in place of Count Ponce", witnessed the king's charter to Santa María de Niencebas. King García Ramírez of Navarre was present at this meeting to discuss Alfonso's planned campaign against Almería the following year. At the same time, he was a witness to the treaty of alliance between Alfonso VII and the Republic of Genoa. The Poema de Almería does not name him, but mentions the participation of Fernando Yáñez and his many sons.

Pelayo did not inherit Montoro from his father in 1154. It was given instead to Nuño Pérez de Lara. On 26 September 1158, King Ferdinand II granted him lands in compensation for damage done to his lands in Galicia by Portuguese forces. On 20 April 1159, he and his wife purchased a share in the church of Santa Cristina in Lavadores from Alfonso Oséviz for seventy solidi.

Pelayo and his wife were still alive in 1173.

== Bibliography ==
- Barton, Simon (1997). The Aristocracy in Twelfth-Century León and Castile. Cambridge University Press.
- Calderón Medina, Inés; Martins Ferreira, João Paulo (2014). "Beyond the Border: The Aristocratic Mobility Between the Kingdoms of Portugal and León (1157–1230)". e-Journal of Portuguese History. 12 (1): 1–48.
- Fernández Rodríguez, Manuel (2004). Toronium: Aproximación a la Historia de una Tierra Medieval: Galicia y Portugal en la Edad Media. Consejo Superior de Investigaciones Científicas.
- Hall, Martin; Phillips, Jonathan (2013). Caffaro, Genoa and the Twelfth-Century Crusades. Ashgate.
- Reilly, Bernard F. (1998). The Kingdom of León-Castilla Under King Alfonso VII, 1126–1157. University of Pennsylvania Press.
