= Fernando Ponce de Cabrera =

Fernando Ponce de Cabrera may refer to either of two half-brothers who were noblemen of the Kingdom of León:

- Fernando Ponce de Cabrera el Mayor (fl. 1161–1171), son of Ponce de Cabrera and his first wife, Sancha
- Fernando Ponce de Cabrera el Menor (fl. 1163–1200), son of Ponce de Cabrera and his second wife, María Fernández
