= Siege of Oreja =

Siege of the Castle of Oreja in 1139

- Part of the Reconquista
Date	April – October 1139
Location	Castle of Oreja on the river Tagus
Result	Christian victory

Belligerents
Castilians, Galicians, Leonese, and Toledans (Christians)	Almoravids (Muslims)

Commanders and leaders
Alfonso VII, Gutierre and Rodrigo Fernández	Ali

The siege of Oreja was a siege by the forces of Alfonso VII, Emperor of Spain, that lasted from April until October 1139 when the Almoravid garrison surrendered. It was the first major victory of the renewed Reconquista that characterised the last two decades of Alfonso's reign. The fortress of Oreja (Aurelia) was located in the left (southern) bank of the Tagus, within the current-day limits of the Spanish municipality of Ontígola.

== Principal sources ==
The main source for the siege of Oreja is the contemporary Chronica Adefonsi imperatoris, a narrative of Alfonso's reign in two books. According to this source, at the time it was "the largest campaign that had been conducted in the combined regions of Toledo and Extremadura." Historian Bernard Reilly has succinctly explained the "virtues and vices" of the Chronica as a reliable historical account: ". . . the second book of the [Chronica] is made up largely of a series of popular tales originally composed separately and only subsequently tacked together in a literary, Latin text appended to the more traditional and staid annals that form most of its first book. The compiler has often scarcely bothered to reconcile his materials, much less treat them critically."

Nineteen royal charters were issued from Alfonso's camp during the siege (nos. 334–52), and another two (nos. 353–54) are important for its dating. The dating and chronology of the siege can be most reliably established from an examination of the documents.

== Background ==
The town of Oreja (Aurelia), with its castle, lay on the Tagus about 50 kilometres (31 mi) upstream from Toledo. It was of strategic importance for the defence of Toledo. In 1113, at the height of the civil war between Queen Urraca, the supporters of her son, the future Alfonso VII, and the supporters of her husband, Alfonso the Battler, while it was being guarded by the duke of nearby Toledo, Álvar Fáñez, Oreja fell to the Muslims. According to the Chronica:

The King of Sevilla and the King of Córdoba and all the other Almoravide rulers in the south had gathered a large army of cavalry, infantry and archers. They proceeded to the territory of Toledo and began to attack the castle at Oreja. They massacred the Christians there and took many prisoners. . . [The soldiers] in Oreja were [daily moving on the offensive] against Toledo and against other cities in the Trans-Sierra region. They committed many massacres and carried away a great deal of booty.

By March 1115 it was either back in Christian hands or its Christian population in exile at Toledo had its own alcalde, a certain Genesio recorded in a private charter at that time. In 1131 there was another Christian–Muslim skirmish—"a fierce battle", the Chronica calls it—near Oreja that resulted in Muslim victory.

The anonymous author of the Chronica notes that the Muslims stationed at Oreja were a constant menace to the Christians of the alfoz (region) around Toledo. When Alfonso VII "realized that the Lord had given him somewhat of a respite from his enemies" early in 1139, "he took counsel with his advisors" and decided to besiege Oreja in April. The commander of the Muslim garrison was Ali, a "famous infidel chieftain [and] notorious murderer of Christians" in the Trans-Sierra. According to the Chronica the defenders included a large number of archers and cavalry, with a somewhat more modest infantry contingent, and consisted in both native Muslims and Almoravid Berbers from northern Africa. The castle was well-prepared for an assault, and boasted catapults "for hurling large stones".

== Siege ==
=== Initiation ===
The siege was begun in April by the brothers Gutierre and Rodrigo Fernández, both governors on the frontier, at the orders of Alfonso, each with their own mesnadas (knightly retinues) and with the militias (cavalry and infantry) of Toledo and the other cities of the Trans-Sierra and the Extremadura. The towns of Ávila, Guadalajara, Madrid, Salamanca, Segovia, Talavera, and Zamora are known to have had especially active militias on the southern frontier in the period. Probably at least the municipalities of Ávila, Salamanca, and Segovia participated. While the Fernández brothers began the siege, Alfonso gathered "all of the military personnel from Galicia, León and Castile", in the words of the Chronica, at a place unnamed, and departed for Oreja with a large number of infantry troops.

When the royal army arrived is unknown, and the first evidence of the king's presence is in a charter he issued from the siege on 25 July. This charter shows that a large contingent of magnates from Galicia had joined Alfonso at the siege, including Fernando Yáñez and his son Pelayo Curvo, Rodrigo Vélaz, and, according to documents in the archives of Santa María de Oseira, four of the sons of Pedro Fróilaz de Traba: Fernando Pérez, García Pérez, Rodrigo Pérez, and Vermudo Pérez. Royal charters issued from the siege during the remainder of the summer show that all of these Galicians left Oreja not long after, possibly to defend the frontier with Portugal, but more likely because they resented long campaigns so far from home. Magnates from the more central provinces, like Gutierre and Rodrigo Fernández, Ramiro Fróilaz, and Rodrigo Gómez, remained at the siege probably until the end. The regular courtiers were also present throughout the campaign, including Ponce de Cabrera, a mainstay of Alfonso's reconquest expeditions. There were seven bishops present. Lope López may also have been present.

The Chronica records that Alfonso also brought with him siege engineers and built several siege engines (probably including at least siege towers "placed against the walls") for investing the castle. To cut off the defenders' water supplies he stationed guards along the riverbank and had a mantlet placed at a location where they had theretofore drawn water in secret. One day the Muslims sallied forth and set the mantlet, left unguarded, on fire, destroying it. Thereafter, however, an order prevented anybody inside the castle from leaving. The internal water reserves ("the cisterns") had been exhausted, and the effects of hunger began to set in: "many of them died for lack of food and water". It is not clear when during the siege this happened, since the Chronica does not provide a clear chronology of those seven months.

=== Surrender ===
The towers of the castle were destroyed by the siege engines and this, the Chronica indicates, convinced Ali to seek terms after "consulting with his advisors". It further records the following messages between the two leaders, by which the terms of the surrender were established:

Ali: "Let us come to terms by means of a peace treaty. Grant us a period of one month, so that we may again send a messenger across the Mediterranean Sea to King Texufin and to all the Spanish Moslems also on this side of the sea. If no one will come to our aid, we will march out and return your castle to you. You will then allow us to go peacefully, taking all of our belongings to our city of Calatrava."

Alfonso: "I will make the following agreement with you: give me fifteen of your nobles as hostages excepting Ali. If no one will come to your defense, you will return my castle to me. Your catapults and all of your weapons and riches will remain in the castle. You will be allow to take only your personal possessions with you. The Christian captives in your dungeons will remain in the castle to be fed by my men at my own expense."

These terms were accepted. The Muslim hostages were sent to Toledo under guard, and both leaders "pledged under oath [to] fulfill every item in the treaty as stated". The defenders went messengers, but they returned with no hope of a timely rescue. The castle surrendered early on the morning of 31 October according to the Chronica. The last royal charter issued before the walls of Oreja is dated 18 October. A charter issued by the king's sister, Sancha Raimúndez, at Sahagún on 27 October 1139 is dated to "the year and month in which Oreja was captured". Considering the time it would have taken for news of the capture to reach Sahagún, Oreja probably surrender closer to 20 October. There is also a royal charter that was issued at Toledo and dated 26 October, presumably only a day or so after the king's returning triumph.

After the surrender Alfonso's banners were raised from the highest tower, accompanied by the twin shouts of acclamation of those holding the banners ("Long live Alfonso, the Emperor of León and of Toledo!") and the assembled clergy with hands raised ("We praise you Lord, we acknowledge your glory"), which included some (unnamed) bishops. The surrendering Muslims first went to Alfonso's camp, where they remained several days as honoured guests and received back their hostages. They were then allowed to go with their families and their movable personal property under military escort, led by Rodrigo Gómez, to Calatrava. This act of general mercy outraged the local residents from around Toledo, who wanted them killed. One recent historian identifies the "Count Rodrigo" the Chronica relates as escorting the defeated with Rodrigo Fernández instead of Rodrigo Gómez.

=== Returning triumph ===
The Chronica provides a description of the triumph which Alfonso received upon his arrival in Toledo after the siege. It is not an historical description, but an extended allusion to passages in the Book of Daniel (3:7) and the Gospel According to Matthew (21:9):

When his coming was announced, all of the leaders of the Christians, Moors and Jews and all the commoners of the city went out to meet him with tambourines, lutes, psalteries and many other musical instruments. In his own tongue each one of them praised and glorified God who had aided all of the enterprises of the Emperor. They were saying, "Blessed is he who comes in the name of the Lord, and blessed are you and your wife and your children and the kingdom of your fathers, and blessed is your compassion and forbearance."

Inside the city, Raimundo, the Archbishop of Toledo, led a long procession of clerics and monks into the plaza of the city and welcomed the Emperor. They went to the Church of Saint Mary during which time the archbishop was singing, "Fear God obey his commandments."

== Fuero ==
Alfonso re-fortified the castle, leaving a garrison composed of knights and infantry, and supplied with several siege engines for defensive purposes. He also replenished the internal water supply and added food provisions. Alfonso also organised the resettlement of the town with a fuero (collection of privileges) in November. The new settlers were required to remit to the king a fifth of any booty they might take at the enemy's expense. The settlers could not be traitors nor any "count or other power who possessed royal fiefs", but those who were in disgrace or had gained the king's anger could take refuge in Oreja.

The town, like Ocaña, was also granted the "abduction privilege". According to this custom, a man who had abducted a woman could take refuge in the town, the king levying a fine of five hundred sueldos on anybody who injured or killed him. This policy was designed to encourage settlement by providing a means for settlers to procure wives. Alfonso had first granted this privilege to Guadalajara in 1133, but in the case of Oreja it was severely restricted: the abductee could not be already married, related to the abductor, or abducted by force; she had to come voluntarily and of marriageable age. The law was designed to prevent families from repatriating eloped female relatives, and to prevent cuckolds from taking back their adulterous wives.

The fuero of Oreja, like that of Escalona, also protected new settlers' properties in their places of origin. They were exempted from service for these, and also extended royal protection. It was typically required of settlers in New Castile to stay in their new possessions for at least one year, and such was the case in Alfonso's fuero for Oreja. Afterwards settlers often sold off their new land. Alfonso also exempted Oreja from having to pay the portaticum or portazgo, the usual toll on transporting goods along a certain road or through a certain territory, throughout his kingdoms except in the region of Toledo. Further, if any person in the kingdom wished to take legal action against an inhabitant of Oreja he had to go to a place on the bank of the Tagus beneath the walls of the castle of Oreja and seek judgement there. This law, too, was not unusual for re-settlements, although again persons from Toledo were excepted.

The fuero of Oreja has been edited and published at least twice:

- C. Gutiérrez del Arroyo, "Fueros de Oreja y Ocaña", Anuario de Historia del Derecho Español, 17 (1946), 651–62.
- Alfonso García-Gallo, "Los fueros de Toledo", Anuario de Historia del Derecho Español, 45 (1975), 341–488. Cf. "Fuero del Castillo de Oreja concedido por Alfonso VII (Toledo, 3 de noviembre de 1139)" on pp. 469–71.

== Bibliography ==
- S. F. BARTON. "Two Catalan Magnates in the Courts of the Kings of León-Castile: The Careers of Ponce de Cabrera and Ponce de Minerva Re-Examined." Journal of Medieval History, 18:3 (1992), 233–66.
- S. F. BARTON. The Aristocracy in Twelfth-century León and Castile. Cambridge: Cambridge University Press, 1997.
- S. F. BARTON. "From Tyrants to Soldiers of Christ: The Nobility of Twelfth-century León-Castile and the Struggle Against Islam." Nottingham Medieval Studies, 44 (2000), 28–48.
- H. DILLARD. Daughters of the Reconquest: Women in Castilian Town Society, 1100–1300. Cambridge: Cambridge University Press, 1984.
- R. A. FLETCHER. Saint James's Catapult: The Life and Times of Diego Gelmírez of Santiago de Compostela. Oxford: Oxford University Press, 1984.
- A. HUICI MIRANDA. Historia musulmana de Valencia y de su región, III. Valencia: 1970.
- J. M^{a}. LACARRA DE MIGUEL. "Acerca de la atracción de pobladores en las ciudades fronterizas de la España cristiana (siglos XI–XII)." En la España medieval, 2 (1982), 485–98.
- G. E. LIPSKEY. The Chronicle of Alfonso the Emperor: A Translation of the Chronica Adefonsi imperatoris. PhD dissertation, Northwestern University, 1972.
- J. F. POWERS. A Society Organized for War: The Iberian Municipal Militias in the Central Middle Ages, 1000–1284. Berkeley: University of California Press, 1987.
- B. F. REILLY. The Kingdom of León-Castilla under Queen Urraca, 1109–1126. Princeton: Princeton University Press, 1982.
- B. F. REILLY. The Kingdom of León-Castilla under King Alfonso VII, 1126–1157. Philadelphia: University of Pennsylvania Press, 1998.
- R. ROGERS. Latin Siege Warfare in the Twelfth Century. Oxford: Oxford University Press, 1992.
