= Otto de Bonvillano =

Otto de Bonvillano (Italian: Ottone di Bonvillano) was a citizen of the Republic of Genoa and a colonial administrator. The principal source for his life and activities is Cafarus’ Ystoria captionis Almarie et Turtuose.

== Conquest of Almería ==
Otto took part in the reconquista (Christian reconquest) of the Muslim port city of Almería by a league of Genoa and the Kingdom of Castile–León with their respective allies in 1147. When the Siege of Almería began in August 1147, the Castilian king, Alfonso VII the Emperor, was away campaigning against the Muslims in the region of Jaén. The Genoese delegated Otto to go to his camp and remind him of his duty to his allies:

They sent Oto de Bonovillano as a legate to the Emperor who was at Baeza. The Emperor had already dismissed his army and did not have any more than 400 knights and 1000 foot soldiers. When he heard that the Genoese fleet had arrived, the Emperor regretted that he just dismissed his army. He said he would come, but he took his time.

The city fell, after the king's arrival, on 17 October and Alfonso invested the Genoese a third of the city as per their prior agreement. On 11 November the republic leased out its third for a period of thirty years to Otto, who had played such a prominent rôle in the negotiations and the conquest. Otto in turn swore fealty to Genoa and agreed to pay the city a small sum annually. He also swore to keep an army of three hundred in the city at all times and not to charge any tolls on traders from Liguria. Otto is the first example of a private citizen of Genoa holding the republic's territory for it as a vassal. This was the initial, indirect way in which Genoa managed its overseas dependencies.

== Governor of Almería ==
After the Genoese fleet sailed, taking with it the plunder to pay off the republic's war debt, Otto was left to guard the city with a thousand men, "which he did", in the words of Cafarus. The discrepancy between contemporary documents in the number of troops left with Otto, and reference to the agreement between Alfonso and Genoa of 1146, suggests that Almería may have been ruled as a condominium in accordance with the original agreement. In the grant to Otto, the consuls of Genoa stressed their government of the city as being both honoring to God, Christendom and Genoa:

The consuls have made this grant because they have captured the city of Almería for the honour of God and of all Christianity and they have determined to remain in control of the city out of the greatest necessity of Christians, and most of all because they know that it is honorable and useful to the city of Genoa.

Otto remained in Spain for several more years as governor of the Genoese quarter of Almería, and acquired territory in the region. The castle of Albuher (Villamanrique de Tajo), acquired by Ponce Giraldo de Cabrera from the king on 18 November 1153, was granted by him to Otto some years later.
