= Fernando Ponce de Cabrera el Menor =

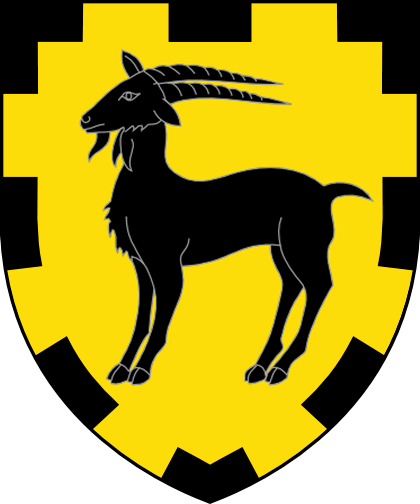
The goat (cabra) was the symbol of the Cabrera family and Fernando Ponce pioneered its usage, having it drawn onto a charter of his in 1200. (The coat-of-arms pictured actually belonged to Bernard IV of Cabrera.)

Fernando Ponce de Cabrera (fl. 1163–1200), called el Menor ("the younger"), was an important nobleman of the Kingdom of León.

Fernando was a younger son of Ponce de Cabrera, a Catalan baron who had emigrated to León, and María Fernández, daughter of Fernando Pérez de Traba and Sancha González. Between 1161 and 1163 a Fernando Ponce was the alférez (or signifer, standard-bearer) of Ferdinand II, but this was probably his elder brother of the same name, Fernando Ponce el Mayor. In 1163 Fernando Ponce made a donation to the Cathedral of Zamora and in 1164 to the Benedictine monastery of San Martín de Castañeda, though his later religious patronage would focus on the Cistercians. He made donations to their monasteries at Meira (1198) and Moreruela (1196), the latter founded by his father. On 4 August 1171 the two Fernando Ponces sold their land in Valdesalce to a certain Fernán Baldrín.

The first tenencias Fernando Ponce held were Melgar (1172–90), which he continued to hold throughout most of his career, and Allariz (1174), which he held but briefly. He was also briefly installed in the Limia in 1173, and he was re-installed as governor there on four later occasions: 1178–79, 1182–84, 1187, and 1195–96. In 1177 he was briefly sine terra ("without land"), but was installed in Lemos, which he held until 1180, and where he governed subsequently in 1187 and 1192. By April 1178 he had attained the rank of count (Latin: comes), the highest in the kingdom, and was charged with the tenencias of the Cabrera (1178–81) and Toroño (1178).

Sometime before January 1183 Fernando married Estefanía López, daughter of Lope Díaz I de Haro and Aldonza Rodríguez. She gave him two sons, Fernando and Pedro. By 29 October 1200 the couple had separated, but she was still alive as late as July 1215. In 1183 Fernando made donations to the Order of Calatrava and to the regular clergy of the Sar. In 1188 he was appointed majordomo by Ferdinand II, and he continued in that post under Alfonso IX as late as September 1189. This period, the final years of the reign of Ferdinand II and the early years of that of his son, corresponds to Fernando Ponce's maximum power and influence, when he held the large and important tenencias of Extremadura (1188–92), Salamanca (1189–90), Tierra de Campos (1186–93), Valladolid (1190), and Zamora (1176, 1188–92). He also held Sanabria (1182–89), Mayorga (1186–87), Benavente (1186–89), and the Transierra (1188). Sanabria and Zamora had once been held by his father and passed on to his elder brother. Late in his career he briefly possessed Robledo (1198) and Valdemora (1198). In 1200 Fernando Ponce made a second donation to the Cathedral of Zamora, where his father was buried, his first in thirty-seven years. When he died not long thereafter he was buried in the abbey of Moreruela.
