= Poem of Almería =

Medieval Latin epic poem

The Poem of Almería (Spanish: Poema de Almería) is a medieval Latin epic poem in 385 1/2 leonine hexameters. It was appended to the end of the Chronica Adefonsi imperatoris, an account of the reign of Alfonso VII of León and Castile, and narrates the victorious military campaign of 1147 that culminated in the conquest of the port of Almería. The poem, as it survives, is unfinished, abruptly ending mid-line before recounting the actual siege of Almería itself. Of its surviving lines, 293 consist of "dénombrement épique, a stirring roll-call of the chief members and contingents of the army".

The Poem has aroused interest among scholars and critics for the light it may shed on the origins and development of vernacular epic (the cantares de gesta) and on the nature of Iberian aristocratic and military customs. It has been described as "a relict of incomparable interest for the cultural archaeology of the twelfth century" and "a splendid reflection of its time and, in this regard, full of gold also as literature". Stylistically, the Poem is indebted to the parallelism of the poetry of the Hebrew Bible and to the classical models of Virgil and Ovid.

== Editions ==
- L. T. Belgrano, ed. "Frammento di Poemetto sincrono su la conquista di Almeria nel MCXLVII". Atti della Società Ligure di storia patria 19 (1887).
- F. Castro Guisasola, ed. El cantar de la conquista de Almería por Alfonso VII: un poema hispano-latín del siglo XII. Granada: 1992.
- E. Flórez, ed. "Chronica Adefonsi Imperatoris." España Sagrada 21 (1766): 320–409.
- J. Gil, ed. "Carmen de expugnatione Almariae urbis." Habís V (1974): 45–64. online
- J. Gil, ed. "Prefatio de Almaria." Chronica Hispana saeculi XII, Pars Prima, ed. E. Falque, J. Gil and A. Maya (Turnhout: 1990): 249–67.
- G. E. Lipskey, ed. and trans. The Chronicle of Alfonso the Emperor. PhD Dissertation, Northwestern University, 1972. online
- C. Rodríguez Aniceto, ed. "El poema latino Prefacio de Almería." Boletín de la Biblioteca Menédez y Pelayo 13 (1931): 140–75. online
- H. Salvador Martínez, ed. and trans. El “Poema de Almería” y la épica románica. Madrid: 1975.
- L. Sánchez Belda, ed. Chronica Adefonsi imperatoris. Madrid: 1950.

== General bibliography ==
- S. F. Barton. "Two Catalan Magnates in the Courts of the Kings of León-Castile: The Careers of Ponce de Cabrera and Ponce de Minerva Re-Examined." Journal of Medieval History 18:3 (1992): 233–66.
- S. F. Barton. The Aristocracy in Twelfth-century León and Castile. Cambridge: 1997.
- S. F. Barton. "From Tyrants to Soldiers of Christ: The Nobility of Twelfth-century León-Castile and the Struggle Against Islam." Nottingham Medieval Studies 44 (2000): 28–48. online
- S. F. Barton. "A Forgotten Crusade: Alfonso VII of León-Castile and the Campaign for Jaén (1148)." Historical Research 73:182 (2000): 312–20. online
- S. F. Barton. "The ‘Discovery of Aristocracy’ in Twelfth-century Spain: Portraits of the Secular Élite in the Poem of Almería." Bulletin of Hispanic Studies 83 (2006): 453–68.
- S. F. Barton and R. A. Fletcher, eds. The World of El Cid: Chronicles of the Spanish Reconquest. Manchester: 2000.
- J. J. Duggan. The Cantar de Mio Cid: Poetic Creation in Its Economic and Social Contexts. Cambridge: 1989.
- B. Dutton. "Gonzalo de Berceo and the Cantares de Gesta." Bulletin of Hispanic Studies 38:3 (1961): 197–205.
- Á. Ferrari. "Artificios septenarios en la Chronica Adefonsi imperatoris y Poema de Almería." Boletín de la Real Academia de la Historia 153 (1963): 19–67.
- Á. Ferrari. "El cluniacense Pedro de Poitiers y la Chronica Adefonsi imperatoris y Poema de Almería." Boletín de la Real Academia de la Historia 153 (1963): 153–204.
- R. A. Fletcher. "Reconquest and Crusade in Spain, c.1050–1150." Transactions of the Royal Historical Society 37 (1987): 31–47.
- R. A. Fletcher. The Quest for El Cid. London: 1989.
- J. Gibbs. "Quelques observations sur le Poema de Almería." Actes et Mémoires, Société Rencesvals, IV^{e} Congrès International (Heidelberg: 1967): 76–81.
- R. D. Giles. "“Del día que fue conde”: The Parodic Remaking of the Count of Barcelona in the Poema de mio Cid." La corónica: A Journal of Medieval Hispanic Languages, Literatures, and Cultures 38:1 (2009): 121–38.
- I. J. las Heras. "Los héroes del Poema de Almería (Castilla, siglo XII) (primera parte)." Temas medievales 7 (1997): 97–224.
- I. J. las Heras. "Los héroes del Poema de Almería (Castilla, siglo XII) (conclusión)." Temas medievales 9 (1999): 153–76.
- J. Horrent. "Sur deux témoignages espagnols de la Chanson de Roland." Bulletin Hispanique 53 (1956), 48–50.
- W.-D. Lange. "El IV° Congreso Internacional de la “Société Rencesvals”." Anuario de estudios medievales 4 (1967): 705–9.
- M. Martínez Pastor. "Virtuosismos verbales en el Poema de Almería." Epos 4 (1988): 379–87. online
- M. Martínez Pastor. "La rima en el Poema de Almería." Cuadernos de filología clásica 21 (1988): 73–96. online
- M. Martínez Pastor. "La métrica del Poema de Almería: su carácter cuantitativo." Cuadernos de filología clásica: Estudios latinos 1 (1991): 159–94. online
- M. Martínez Pastor. "Las cláusulas del hexámetro en el Poema de Almería: tipología verbal." Humanitas: in honorem Antonio Fontán (Spain: 1992), 363–73.
- M. Martínez Pastor. "Acento y versificación en hexámetros medievales." Cuadernos de filología clásica: Estudios latinos 5 (1993): 141–48. online
- M. Martínez Pastor. "Las cláusulas del Poema de Almería: Cadencia acentual." Actas del VIII Congreso Español de Estudios Clásicos 1 (1994): 619–26.
- J. F. O'Callaghan. Reconquest and Crusade in Medieval Spain. Philadelphia: 2003.
- E. Pascua Echegaray. "Hacia la formación política de la monarquía medieval: las relaciones entre la monarquía y la Iglesia castellanoleonesa en el reinado de Alfonso VII." Hispania 49:172 (1989): 397–441.
- E. von Richthofen. "Problemas rolandinos, almerienses y cidianos." Anuario de estudios medievales 5 (1968): 437–44.
- F. Rico Manrique. "Las letras latinas de siglo XII en Galicia, León y Castilla." Ábaco: Estudios sobre literatura española 2 (1969): 9–91.
- F. Rico Manrique. "Del Cantal del Cid a la Eneida: tradiciones épicas en torno al Poema de Almería." Boletín de la Real Academia Española 65:235 (1985): 197–212.
- C. C. Smith. "Latin Histories and Vernacular Epic in Twelfth-century Spain: Similarities of Spirit and Style." Bulletin of Hispanic Studies 48:1 (1971): 1–19.
- C. C. Smith. "The Personages of the Poema de Mio Cid and the Date of the Poem." The Modern Language Review 66:3 (1971): 580–98.
- C. C. Smith. "Toward a Reconciliation of Ideas about Medieval Spanish Epic." The Modern Language Review 89:3 (1994): 622–34.
- A. Ubieto Arteta. "Observaciones al Cantar de Mio Cid." Arbor 37:138 (1957): 145–70.
- A. Ubieto Arteta. "Sugerencias sobre la Chronica Adefonsi imperatoris." Cuadernos de Historia de España 25–26 (1957): 317–26.
- J. B. Williams. "The Making of a Crusade: The Genoese Anti-Muslim Attacks in Spain, 1146–1148." Journal of Medieval History 23:1 (1997): 29–53.
- R. Wright. Late Latin and Early Romance in Spain and Carolingian France. Liverpool: 1982.
