= Mutiny of the Trout =

Semi-legendary revolt in Zamora, Spain

The Mutiny of the Trout (Spanish: Motín de la Trucha) was a semi-legendary popular revolt in Zamora, Spain, in late 1157. The uprising is first mentioned in a late 15th- or early 16th-century manuscript associated with Florián de Ocampo. While the story is not inherently implausible, there is no near-contemporary evidence for it and modern scholars have been hesitant to accept it as historical.

The revolt supposedly began as a dispute over a trout. The steward of Gómez Álvarez de Vizcaya, the town governor or regidor, tried to requisition an especially fine-looking trout from a local fishmonger who had already promised to sell it to the shoemaker. The steward then claimed that the regidor had prior rights. During the ensuing argument, which attracted several other townsmen to support the shoemaker, the steward arrested the latter and some of his supporters. This sparked a riot. Some local knights, including the eldest son (unnamed in the sources) of Count Ponce Giraldo de Cabrera, then governor of Zamora, convened in the church of Santa María to discuss the proper course of action, the rioters locked them in and set the church alight, burning to death all inside. They then razed to the ground the house of the regidor, and, fearing the reprisals of Count Ponce, they fled en masse to the Portuguese border and asked the king, Ferdinand II, through messengers to pardon them and confiscate Ponce's lands (tenencias). Ferdinand feared that they would abandon Zamora permanently and settle in Portugal, the kingdom of his enemy. The enemies of Ponce de Cabrera at court counselled the king to accede to the townsfolk's demands, and so pardon was granted and Ponce was deprived of his governorships and exiled.

One commentator has seen in the story "notable indications of its veracity" (no desdeñables indicios de su veracidad), but it is not widely accepted by historians. Urban uprisings were characteristic of the Kingdom of León at the time. In 1161 there was one in Lugo and in 1162 a further two in Salamanca and Ávila. The exile of Ponce de Cabrera is also a historical fact, but no source other than the Mutiny story provides a reason for it. He soon returned to favour:

Tenía la governación de la cibdad de Zamora por el dicho rey don Fernando el Conde don Ponce de Cabrera y el rey tomó tal enojo del por este caso que lo despojó de la tierra que le dava y él se fue huyendo al rey de Castilla don Sancho, el deseado, el qual después le ganó perdón y retitución con gracia y su hazienda y bolvió a la cibdad con el cargo que primero tenía.	Holding the government of the city of Zamora from the said king don Fernando was the Count don Ponce de Cabrera, and the king was so angered by this case [the Mutiny] that he dispossessed him of the land that he had given him and he [Ponce] fled to the king of Castile don Sancho, the Desired [Sancho III of Castile], he [Ponce] whom afterwards gained from him [Fernando] pardon and restitution with grace and his estates and he returned to the city with the office that he had at first held.
