= Fernando Ponce de Cabrera el Mayor =

Nobleman

Fernando Ponce de Cabrera (fl. 1161–1171), called el Mayor ("the elder"), was an important nobleman of the Kingdom of León, the second son of three of Ponce de Cabrera, a Catalan baron who had emigrated to León, and his first wife, Sancha (?Núñez), who was deceased by 1142. He married Guiomar Rodríguez, daughter of Rodrigo Pérez de Traba. Between 13 February 1161 and August 1163 Fernando Ponce was the alférez or signifer (standard-bearer) of Ferdinand II, although it is possible that his younger brother of the same name, Fernando Ponce el Menor, is the one to whom the documents refer.

Early in 1161, Ferdinand, prompted by fear that Afonso I of Portugal was planning an invasion, bestowed the tenencias (tenancies-in-chief) of Ciudad Rodrigo and Ledesma on Ponce, who in turn gave the latter to his son Fernando. In 1162, on the death of his father, Fernando succeeded to the tenencia of Sanabria. On 25 May 1163 Fernando, along with his siblings, made a donation of land at Villarrín de Campos to the cathedral of Zamora for their father's soul. From 1169 he held Zamora, which his father had also held and which his brother Fernando would hold as early as 1176. On 4 August 1171 the two Fernando Ponces sold their land in Valdesalce to a certain Fernán Baldrín. This is the last record of Fernando Ponce el Mayor. By 11 April 1173 his wife Guiomar had remarried.

== Bibliography ==
- E. Fernández-Xesta y Vázquez, "De cuándo y dónde nació el uso de la cabra como signo distintivo en el linaje de los vizcondes de Cabrera", Hidalguía, 33 (1985), 801–25.
- E. Fernández-Xesta y Vázquez, Un magnate catalán en la corte de Alfonso VII: Comes Poncius de Cabreira, princeps Çemore (Madrid: 1991).
- E. Fernández-Xesta y Vázquez, "‘El motín de la trucha’ y sus consecuencias sobre don Ponce Giraldo de Cabrera, ‘Príncipe de Zamora’", Primer Congreso de Historia de Zamora, 3 vols (Zamora: 1991), III, 261–83.
