= Moreruela Abbey =

Coordinates: 41°49′00″N 5°44′00″W

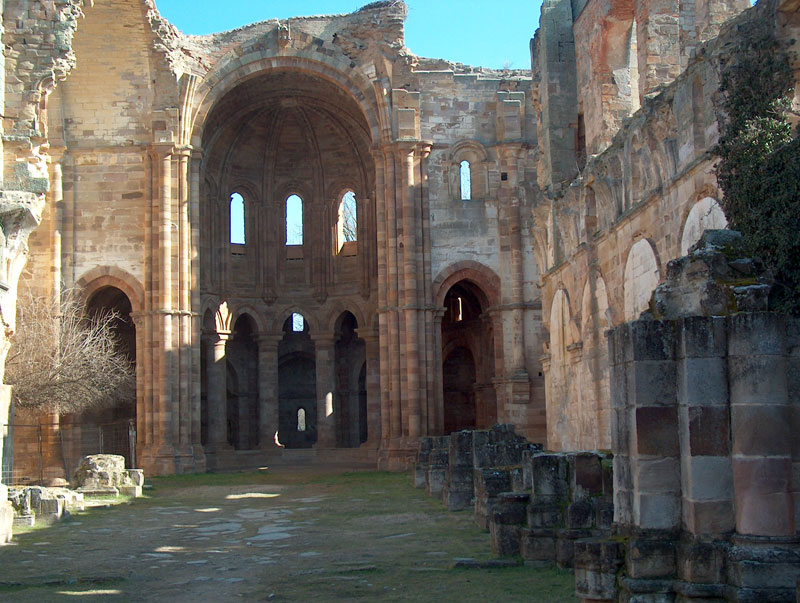
Moreruela Abbey: interior of abbey church ruins, looking east into the apse

Moreruela Abbey (Monasterio de Santa María de Moreruela) is a former Cistercian monastery in the province of Zamora in Castile and León, Spain. The abbey is situated to the west of Granja de Moreruela, about 35 kilometres north of the town of Zamora close to the left bank of the Esla, a tributary of the Duero.

The abbey was declared a national monument in 1931.

== Background ==
Before the time of the Cistercians, a monastery of the Benedictines already stood on the site, founded for them either by the Asturian King Alfonso III or by Saint Froilan, which under the patronage of Alfonso VII the Cistercians took over. The date of this takeover is often put at 1131/1133, which would make Moreruela the earliest Cistercian foundation in Spain. There is however an alternative theory which dates the establishment of the Cistercians here at 1143. (Note: for a summary of the two points of view see "Aguicamp". terra.es.)

Moreruela was a daughter house of Clairvaux, and in its turn was the mother house of Nogales Abbey, also in Spain (1164), and Aguiar Abbey in Portugal (1165).

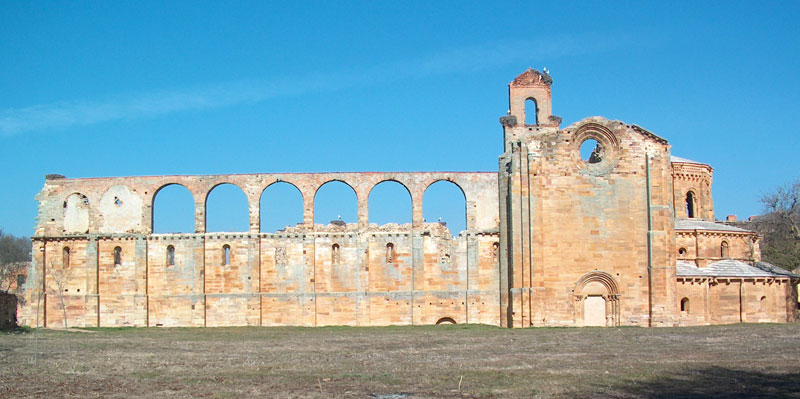
View from the south

There are many remains of the abbey, although in ruins, particularly the Romanesque abbey church in the shape of a Latin cross 63 metres long, the construction of which was begun about 1170 and finished in the second quarter of the 13th century. The apse at the east end is completely preserved and has a vaulted ambulatory round a rectangular choir, with seven chapels as at Clairvaux. (Note: cf. also Pontigny Abbey, Royaumont Abbey, Heisterbach Abbey, etc) Also preserved are the walls of the 27 metres wide transept and of the northern aisle, and parts of the nave, once comprising three aisles and nine bays. Of the conventual buildings to the north of the church, the chapter house among others remains, although partly reconstructed.

== See also ==
- Camino Sanabrés

== Bibliography ==
- de la Granja, Alonso M. (1998). El Monasterio de Moreruela: La primera fundación cisterciense en España (in Spanish). Vol. 50. ISSN 0210-3990.
- Dimier, M.-Anselme (1971). L'Art cistercien hors de France (in French). p. 40.
- Karge, Henrik (1992). Henrik Karge (ed.). Gotische Architektur in Kastilien und León (in German). Vol. 1. BerlinvDietrich Reimer Verlag. pp. 113, 121. ISBN 3-496-01076-2. "with groundplan of the church in the appendix"
- Sáinz Sáiz, Javier (2003). El Románico en Zamora (in Spanish). León: Ediciones Lancia. p. 82. ISBN 84-8177-041-8.
