= Pero Rodrigues de Palmeira =

Portuguese troubadour (c. 1160–after 1225)

Pero Rodrigues de Palmeira (c. 1160 – after 1225) was a Portuguese troubadour. He belonged to the first generation of lyric poets in Galician-Portuguese. All of his works are lost. He is listed as the author of two songs in the index of the 16th-century Cancioneiro da Biblioteca Nacional. This index was made by Angelo Colocci, but the pages where his songs would be are missing.

Pero's family originated in Palmeira. He was born around 1160 to Rui Nunes de Asturias and Elvira Gonçalves de Palmeira. His brother, Martinho Rodrigues, became the bishop of Porto (r. 1191–1235). Between 1180 and 1183, Pero served as the royal lieutenant in command of Trancoso and Viseu. Thereafter, he cannot be traced in Portuguese documents until 1225, when he made out a document for the monastery of Landim in the presence of his brother. The date of his death is unknown. According to the Livro de Linhagens of Pedro de Barcelos, he "died of love" (morreu de amor) for María Páes, the daughter of Pelayo Curvo.
