= Serón de Nágima =

- Municipality
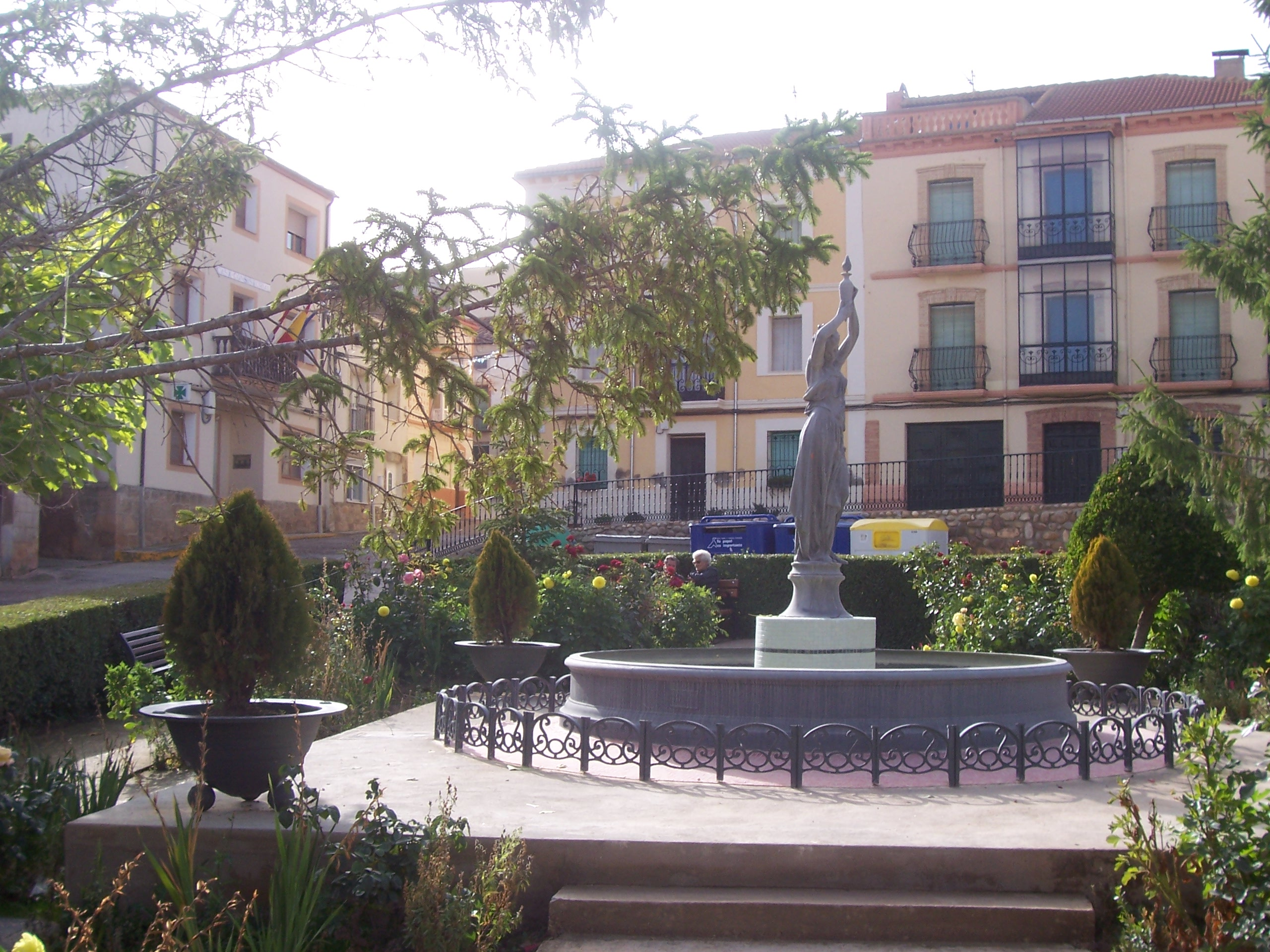
- Main Square of Serón de Nágima

- Coat of arms

- Location in Spain. Serón de Nágima (Spain)
- Coordinates: 41°29′44″N 2°12′05″W
- Country: Spain
- Autonomous community: Castile and León
- Province: Soria
- Municipality: Serón de Nágima

Area
  - Total: 60 km^{2} (23 sq mi)

Population (2025-01-01)
  - Total: 125
  - Density: 2.1/km^{2} (5.4/sq mi)
- Time zone: UTC+1 (CET)
  - Summer (DST): UTC+2 (CEST)
- Website: Official website

Serón de Nágima is a municipality located in the province of Soria, Castile and León, Spain. According to the 2004 census (INE), the municipality has a population of 254 inhabitants.
