= Trefacio =

Coordinates: 42°07′N 6°39′W

- Municipality
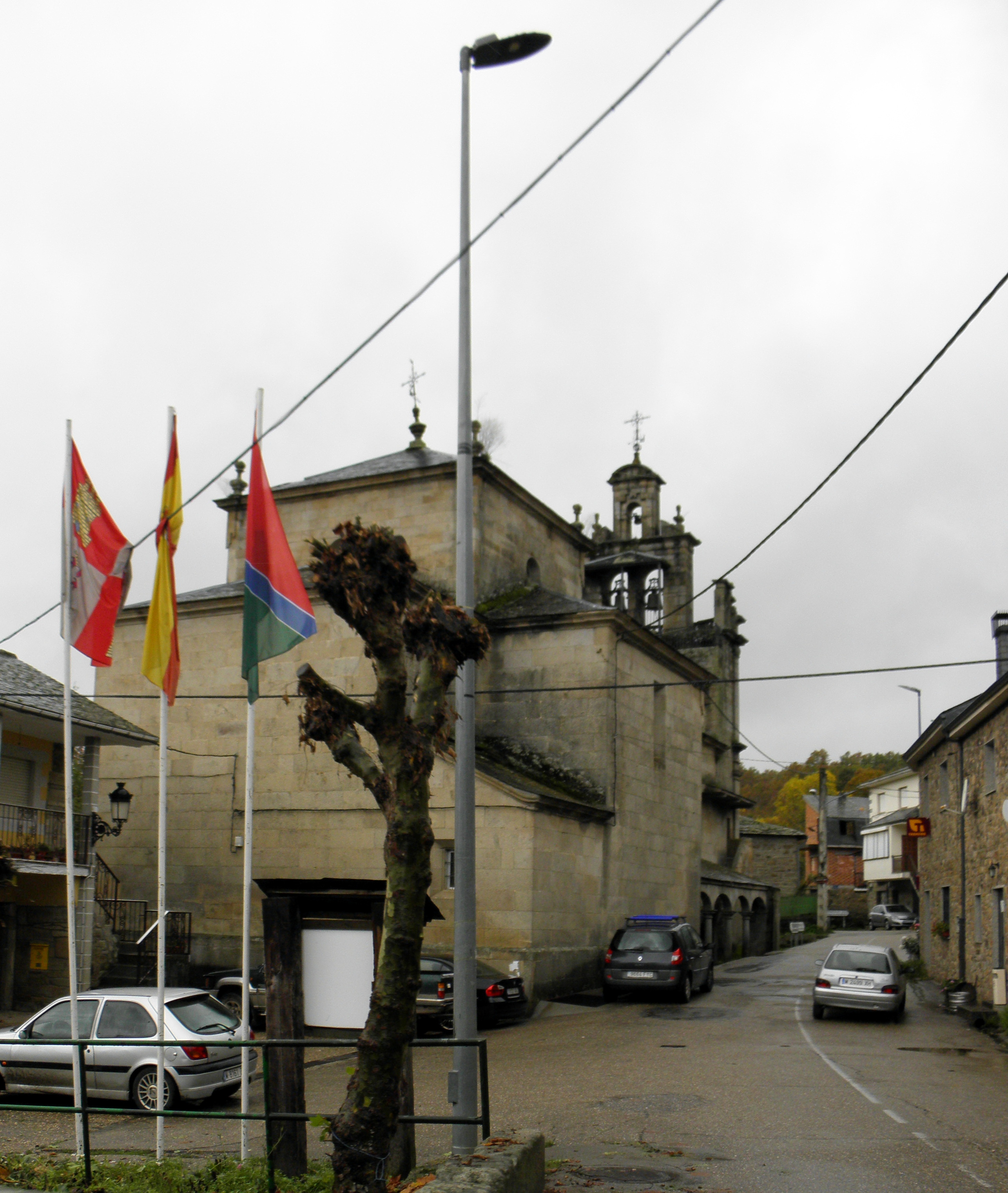

- Flag Coat of arms
- Interactive map of Trefacio
- Country: Spain
- Autonomous community: Castile and León
- Province: Zamora
- Municipality: Trefacio

Area
  - Total: 25 km^{2} (9.7 sq mi)

Population (2025-01-01)
  - Total: 163
  - Density: 6.5/km^{2} (17/sq mi)
- Time zone: UTC+1 (CET)
  - Summer (DST): UTC+2 (CEST)

Trefacio is a municipality located in the province of Zamora, Castile and León, Spain. According to the 2004 census (INE), the municipality has a population of 247 inhabitants.
