= Berengaria of Barcelona =

Queen of León and Castile from 1128 to 1149

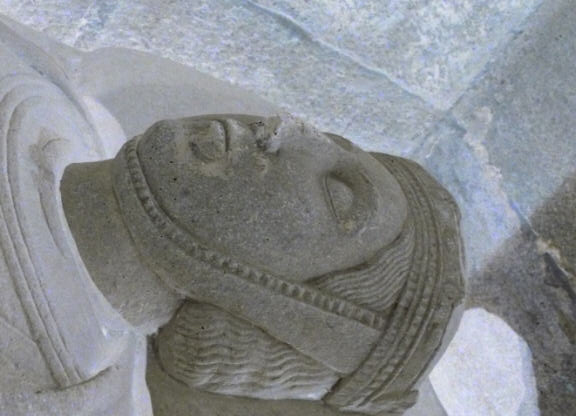
- Effigy of Queen Berengaria at the Cathedral of Santiago de Compostela

Queen consort of León and Castile
- Tenure: 1128–1149
- Born: c. 1116
- Died: 15 January 1149 (aged 32-33); Palencia
- Burial: 15 January 1149; Cathedral of Santiago de Compostela
- Spouse: Alfonso VII of León and Castile
- Issue among others...: Sancho III, King of Castile; Ferdinand II, King of León; Constance, Queen of France; Sancha, Queen of Navarre
- House: Barcelona
- Father: Ramon Berenguer III, Count of Barcelona
- Mother: Douce I, Countess of Provence

Berengaria of Barcelona (1116 – 15 January 1149), called in Spanish Berenguela de Barcelona and also known as Berengaria of Provence, was Queen consort of Castile, León and Galicia. She was the daughter of Ramon Berenguer III, Count of Barcelona, and Douce I, Countess of Provence.

== Marriage and death ==
On 10/17 November 1128 in Saldaña, Berengaria married Alfonso VII, King of Castile, León and Galicia.

Their children were:

1. Sancho III of Castile (1134–1158)
2. Ramon, living 1136, died in infancy
3. Ferdinand II of León (1137–1188)
4. Constance (c. 1138–1160), married Louis VII of France
5. Sancha (c. 1139–1179), married Sancho VI of Navarre
6. García (c. 1142–1145/6)
7. Alfonso (c. 1144–c. 1149)

According to a description, "She was a very beautiful and extremely graceful young girl who loved chastity and truth and all God-fearing people."

She died in Palencia on 15 January 1149, and was buried at the Cathedral of Santiago de Compostela.

== In fiction ==
A parody version of queen Berengaria and king Alfonso is presented in the tragicomedy La venganza de Don Mendo by Pedro Muñoz Seca. In its film version, Lina Canalejas played Berengaria.

== Sources ==
- Reilly, Bernard F. (1995). The Contest of Christian and Muslim Spain, 1031-1157. Blackwell Publishing Inc.

Preceded by Beatrice	Queen consort of León and Castile; 1128–1149	Succeeded by Richeza of Poland
