= Granja de Moreruela =

Coordinates: 41°49′N 5°44′W

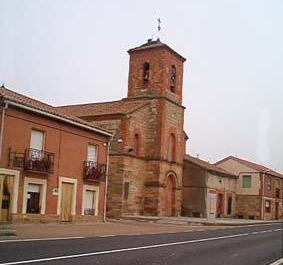

- Coat of arms
- Interactive map of Granja de Moreruela
- Country: Spain
- Autonomous community: Castile and León
- Province: Zamora
- Municipality: Granja de Moreruela

Area
  - Total: 41 km^{2} (16 sq mi)

Population (2025-01-01)
  - Total: 228
  - Density: 5.6/km^{2} (14/sq mi)
- Time zone: UTC+1 (CET)
  - Summer (DST): UTC+2 (CEST)
- Website: granjademoreruela.net

Granja de Moreruela is a municipality located in the province of Zamora, Castile and León, Spain. According to the 2004 census (INE), the municipality has a population of 337 inhabitants.

== Background ==
The Camino Sanabrés, a branch of the Way of Saint James, originates in the town.

== Historical buildings ==
Moreruela Abbey is the most important building located in this municipality. Dating from the 12th century, Moreruela Abbey is often claimed as the first monastery of the Cistercian Order in Spain.
