= Villarrín de Campos =

Coordinates: 41°48′N 5°38′W

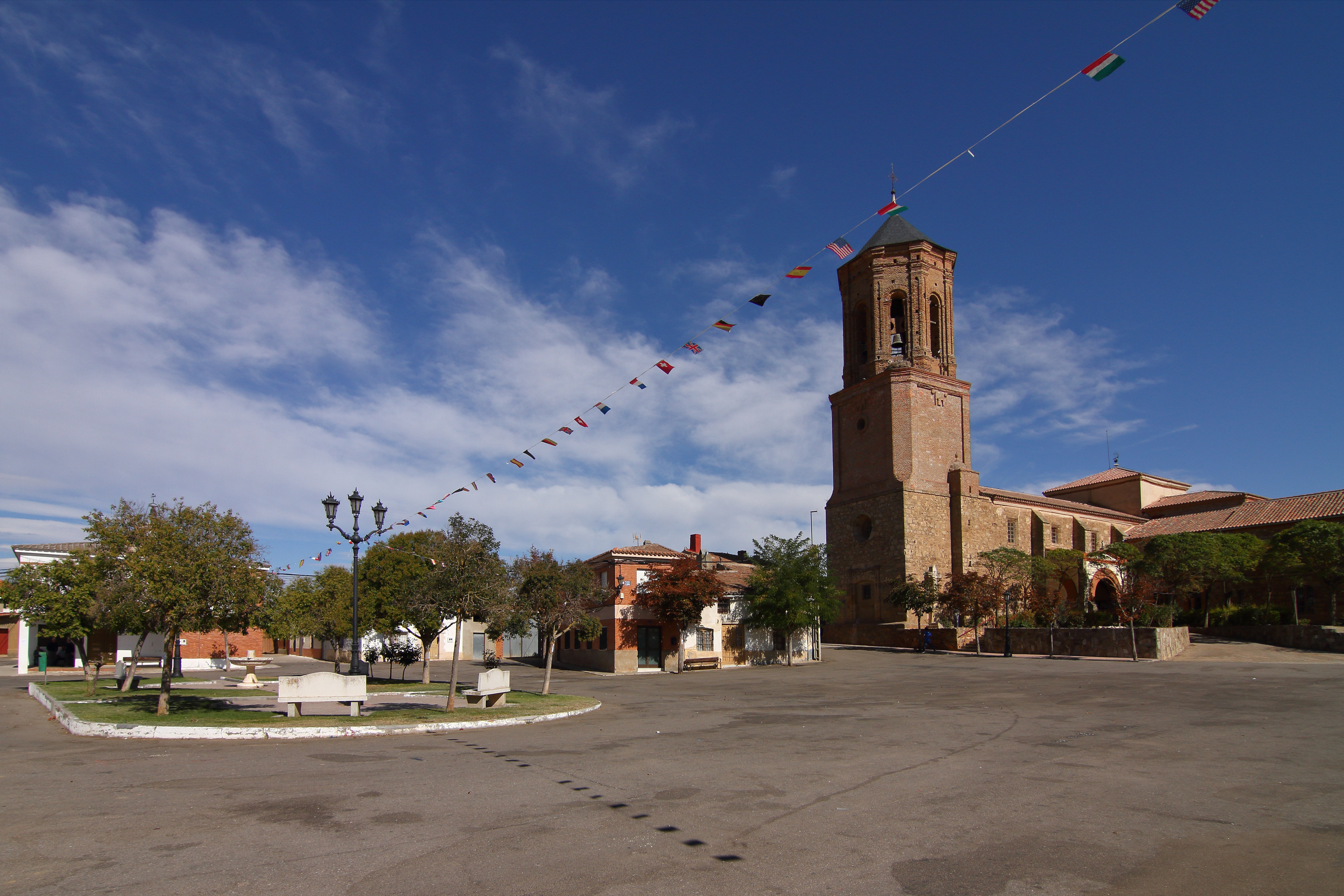

- Coat of arms
- Interactive map of Villarrín de Campos
- Country: Spain
- Autonomous community: Castile and León
- Province: Zamora
- Municipality: Villarrín de Campos

Area
  - Total: 50 km^{2} (19 sq mi)

Population (2025-01-01)
  - Total: 387
  - Density: 7.7/km^{2} (20/sq mi)
- Time zone: UTC+1 (CET)
  - Summer (DST): UTC+2 (CEST)

Villarrín de Campos is a municipality located in the province of Zamora, Castile and León, Spain. According to the 2004 census (INE), the municipality has a population of 583 inhabitants.
