= Melgar de Abajo =

Coordinates: 42°15′N 5°08′W

- Melgar de Abajo, Spain
- Coat of arms

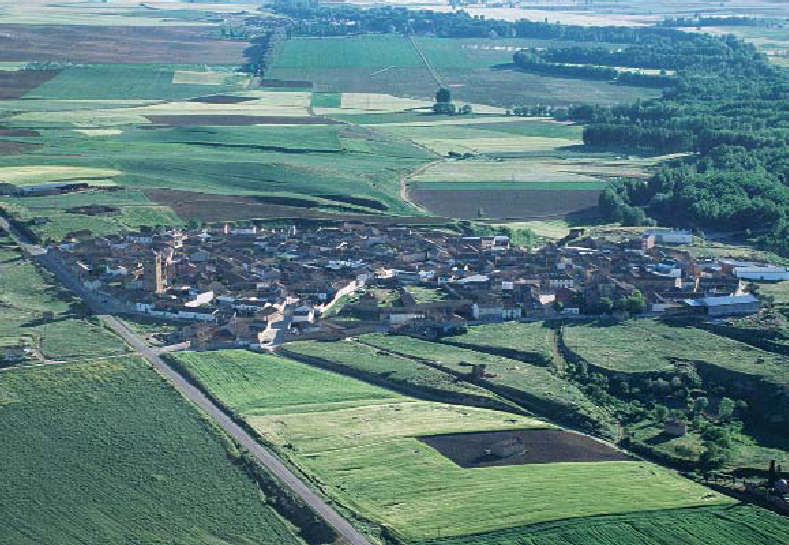
- panoramic view.
- Country: Spain
- Autonomous community: Castile and León
- Province: Valladolid
- Comarca: Tierra de Campos

Government
  - Mayor: Ángel Calvo Crespo (PP)

Area
  - Total: 22 km^{2} (8.5 sq mi)
  - Land: 22 km^{2} (8.5 sq mi)
  - Water: 0 km^{2} (0 sq mi)
- Elevation: 801 m (2,628 ft)

Population (2025-01-01)
  - Total: 117
  - Density: 5.3/km^{2} (14/sq mi)
- Time zone: UTC+1 (CET)
  - Summer (DST): UTC+2 (CEST)
- Postal code: 47687
- Website: (www.melgardeabajo.com) Unofficial website.

Melgar de Abajo is a municipality located in the province of Valladolid, Castile and León, Spain. According to the 2010 census (INE), the municipality has a population of 145 inhabitants.

== Demography ==
Demographic evolution of Melgar de Abajo from 1991 to 2010
1991	1996	2001	2004	2007	2010
222	202	175	170	156	145
