= Villamanrique de Tajo =

Coordinates: 40°04′N 3°14′W

- Municipality
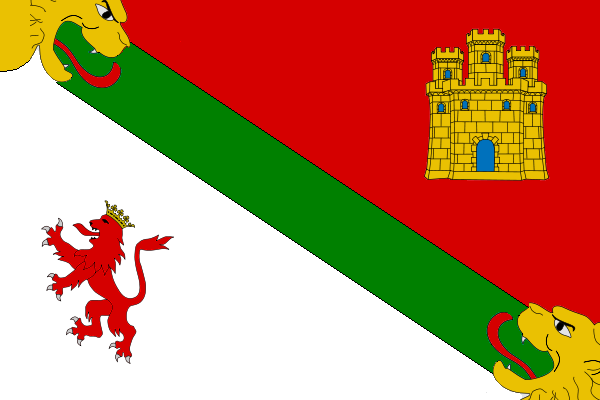
- Flag Coat of arms

- Municipal location within the Community of Madrid.
- Country: Spain
- Autonomous community: Community of Madrid

Area
  - Total: 11.2 sq mi (28.9 km^{2})
- Elevation: 1,791 ft (546 m)

Population (2025-01-01)
  - Total: 859
  - Density: 77.0/sq mi (29.7/km^{2})
- Time zone: UTC+1 (CET)
  - Summer (DST): UTC+2 (CEST)

Villamanrique de Tajo is a municipality of the Community of Madrid, Spain. In 2022 it had a population of 757.
