= Sancho III of Castile =

King of Castile and Toledo from 1157 to 1158

Sancho III
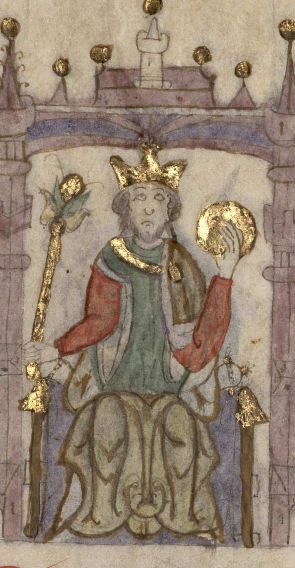
- Sancho III of Castile in the Castilian manuscript Compendium of Chronicles of Kings (...) (c. 1312–1325). Currently located at the National Library of Spain

King of Castile and Toledo
- Reign: 21 August 1157 – 31 August 1158
- Predecessor: Alfonso VII
- Successor: Alfonso VIII
- Born: c. 1134; Toledo
- Died: 31 August 1158 (aged 23–24); Toledo
- Burial: Cathedral of Toledo
- Consort: Blanche of Navarre (m. 1151; died 1156)
- Issue: Alfonso VIII of Castile; Infante Garcia
- House: Castilian House of Ivrea
- Father: Alfonso VII of León and Castile
- Mother: Berengaria of Barcelona

Sancho III (c. 1134 – 31 August 1158), called the Desired (el Deseado), (Note: The early 13th-century historian Rodrigo Jiménez de Rada called him desiderabilis Sancius.) was King of Castile and Toledo for one year from 1157 to 1158. He was the son of Alfonso VII of León and Castile and Berengaria of Barcelona, and was succeeded by his son Alfonso VIII. His nickname was due to his position as the first child of his parents, born after eight years of childless marriage.

During his reign, the Order of Calatrava was founded. It was also in his reign that the Treaty of Sahagún in May 1158 was decided.

== Life ==
Sancho was the eldest son of King Alfonso VII of León and Castile and Berengaria of Barcelona. He was endowed with the Kingdom of Nájera in 1152, but, according to Carolina Carl, never appears in documents as "king of Nájera". He also succeeded Urraca the Asturian in ruling the Kingdom of Artajona. His father's will partitioned the kingdom between his two sons: Sancho inherited the kingdoms of Castile and Toledo, and Ferdinand inherited León. The two brothers had just signed a treaty when Sancho suddenly died in the summer of 1158, being buried at Toledo.

During his reign, the castle of Calatrava-la-Vieja was conceded to Abbot Raymond Serrat of Fitero, who proposed using the lay brothers of his monastery as knights to defend this castle. These knights would give rise to the Order of Calatrava, which was confirmed in 1164 by Pope Alexander III.

The Treaty of Sahagún of May 1158, outlined the spheres of conquests between Leonese and Castilian against al-Andalus. A possible division of the Portuguese kingdom among the two sons of Alfonso VII, would come to nothing due to the premature death of Sancho.

== Marriage ==
Sancho married, in 1151, Blanche of Navarre, daughter of García Ramírez of Navarre, and had:

- Alfonso VIII of Castile, his successor
- infante García, who died at birth in 1156, apparently also resulting in the death of Queen Blanche.

== Sources ==
- Carl, Carolina (2011). A Bishopric Between Three Kingdoms: Calahorra, 1045-1190. Brill.
- Conant, Kenneth John (1959). Carolingian and Romanesque Architecture, 800 to 1200. Yale University Press.
- del Alamo, Elizabeth Valdez; Pendergast, Carol Stamatis (2000). Memory and the Medieval Tomb. Ashgate.
- Hourihane, Colum, ed. (2012). "Carrion de la Condes". The Grove Encyclopedia of Medieval Art and Architecture. Vol. 1. Oxford University Press.
- Lay, Stephen (2009). The Reconquest Kings of Portugal. Political and Cultural Reorientation on the Medieval Frontier. Palgrave Macmillan. ISBN 978-1-349-35786-4.
- Linehan, Peter (2011). Spain:A Partible Inheritance 1157-1300. Blackwell Publishing Ltd.
- Mattoso, José (2007). D. Afonso Henriques (2nd ed.). Temas e Debates. ISBN 9789727599110.
- O'Callaghan, Joseph F. (1975). A History of Medieval Spain. Cornell University Press.
- Shadis, Miriam; Berman, Constance Hoffman (2002). "A Taste of the Feast: Reconsidering Eleanor of Aquitaine's Female Descendents". In Wheeler, B.; Parsons, John C. (eds.). Eleanor of Aquitaine: Lord and Lady. Palgrave Macmillan.
- Van-Houts, Elisabeth (2013). Medieval Memories: Men, Women and the Past, 700-1300. Pearson Education Limited.

Sancho III of Castile Castilian House of Ivrea Cadet branch of the House of Ivrea Born: circa 1134 Died: 31 August 1158
Regnal titles
Preceded by Alfonso VII	King of Castile; 1157–1158	Succeeded by Alfonso VIII
Preceded by Urraca the Asturian	King of the Kingdom of Artajona; 1153–1157	Succeeded by Sancho VI of Navarre
