= Chronica Adefonsi Imperatoris =

Chronicle of the reign of Alfonso VII of León

The Chronica Adefonsi Imperatoris, meaning "Chronicle of Alfonso the Emperor", is a chronicle of the reign of Alfonso VII of León, Emperor of Spain, lasting from 1126 to 1157. The author is anonymous, but he covers far more than just the imperial court.

The Chronica is not hagiographical of the emperor, but is supportive of his imperial policies and takes the concept of an imperium Hispaniae most seriously. The interrelations of the various peninsular kingdoms are laboured extensively, as are Alfonso's pretensions. The Chronica provides the best source of information on twelfth-century Castile-León.
