= Alfonso VII of León and Castile =

King of León, Castile, and Galicia from 1126 to 1157

Alfonso VII
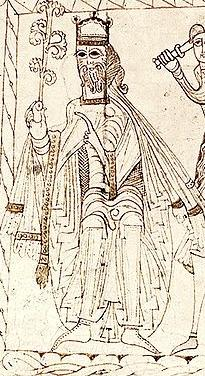
- Alfonso as emperor, from a Privilegium Imperatoris issued by him.

King of León and Castile
- Reign: 1126–1157
- Predecessor: Urraca
- Successor: Sancho III (Castile); Ferdinand II (León)

King of Galicia
- Reign: 1111–1157
- Predecessor: Urraca
- Successor: Ferdinand II

Emperor of All Spain
- Reign: 1126–1157
- Coronation: 26 May 1135
- Predecessor: Urraca
- Successor: Position abolished
- Anti-emperor: Alfonso the Battler (1126–1134)
- Born: 1 March 1105; Caldas de Reis
- Died: 21 August 1157 (aged 52); Sierra Morena
- Burial: Cathedral of Toledo
- Spouses: Berenguela of Barcelona (m. 1128; died 1149) Richeza of Poland (m. 1152)
- Issue among others...: Sancho III, King of Castile; Ferdinand II, King of León; Constance, Queen of France; Sancha, Queen of Navarre; Sancha, Queen of Aragon; Illegitimate: Urraca, Queen of Navarre; Stephanie Alfonso
- House: Castilian House of Ivrea
- Father: Raymond, Count of Galicia
- Mother: Urraca of León and Castile

Alfonso VII (1 March 1105 – 21 August 1157), called the Emperor (el Emperador), became the King of Galicia in 1111 and King of León and Castile in 1126. Born and raised in Galicia as Alfonso Raimúndez, he first used the title Emperor of All Spain, alongside his mother Urraca, once she vested him with the direct rule of Toledo in 1116. He later held another investiture in 1135 in a grand ceremony reasserting his claims to the imperial title. He was the son of Urraca of León and Raymond of Burgundy, and the first king from the House of Burgundy.

Alfonso was a dignified and somewhat enigmatic figure. His rule was characterised by the renewed supremacy of the western kingdoms of Christian Iberia over the eastern (Navarre and Aragón) after the reign of Alfonso the Battler. Though he sought to make the imperial title meaningful in practice to both Christian and Muslim populations, his hegemonic intentions never saw fruition. During his tenure, Portugal became de facto independent in 1128 and was recognized as independent de jure in 1143. He was a patron of poets, including, probably, the troubadour Marcabru.

== Succession to three kingdoms ==
In 1111, Diego Gelmírez, Bishop of Compostela and Pedro Froilaz, the count of Traba, crowned and anointed Alfonso King of Galicia in the cathedral of Santiago de Compostela. He was a child, but his mother had (1109) succeeded to the united throne of León-Castile-Galicia and wished to retain sole rulership of the kingdom. By 1119 he had inherited the formerly Muslim Kingdom of Toledo, where he had become the protégé of its Cluniac archbishop, Bernard of Sédirac. On 10 March 1126, after the death of his mother, he was crowned in León and immediately began the recovery of the Kingdom of Castile, which was then under the domination of Alfonso the Battler. By the Peace of Támara of 1127, the Battler recognised Alfonso VII of Castile. The territory in the far east of his dominion, however, had gained much independence during the rule of his mother and experienced many rebellions. After his recognition in Castile, Alfonso fought to curb the autonomy of the local barons.

When Alfonso the Battler, King of Navarre and Aragón, died without descendants in 1134, he willed his kingdom to the Knights Templar and the Knights Hospitaller. The aristocracy of both kingdoms rejected this. García Ramírez, Count of Monzón was elected in Navarre while Alfonso pretended to the throne of Aragón. The nobles chose another candidate in the dead king's brother, Ramiro II. Alfonso responded by reclaiming La Rioja and "attempted to annex the district around Zaragoza and Tarazona".

In several skirmishes, he defeated the joint Navarro-Aragonese army and put the kingdoms to vassalage. He had the strong support of the lords north of the Pyrenees, who held lands as far as the River Rhône. In the end, however, the combined forces of the Navarre and Aragón were too much for his control. At this time, he helped Ramon Berenguer III, Count of Barcelona, in his wars with the other Catalan counties to unite the old Marca Hispanica.

== Imperial rule ==
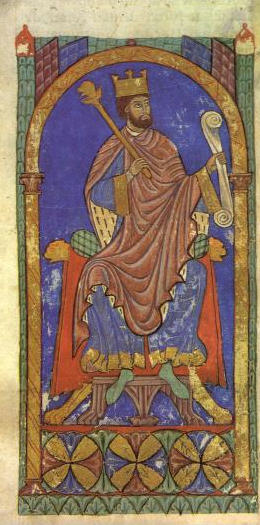
13th-century miniature of Alfonso VII of León from the codex Tumbo A. Santiago de Compostela Cathedral

A vague tradition had always assigned the title of emperor to the sovereign who held León. Sancho the Great considered the city the imperiale culmen and minted coins with the inscription Imperator totius Hispaniae after being crowned in it. Such a sovereign was considered the most direct representative of the Visigothic kings, who had been themselves the representatives of the Roman Empire. But though appearing in charters, and claimed by Alfonso VI of León and Alfonso the Battler, the title had been little more than a flourish of rhetoric.

On 26 May 1135, Alfonso was crowned "Emperor of Spain" in the Cathedral of León. By this, he probably wished to assert his authority over the entire peninsula and his absolute leadership of the Reconquista. He appears to have striven for the formation of a national unity which Spain had never possessed since the fall of the Visigothic kingdom. The elements he had to deal with could not be welded together. After Afonso Henriques recognised him as liege in 1137, Alfonso VII lost the Battle of Valdevez in 1141 thereby affirming Portugal's independence in the Treaty of Zamora (1143). In 1137, Petronila of Aragon was betrothed to Ramon Berenguer IV, rather than to Alfonso's son Sancho, a union which combined Aragon and Catalonia into the Crown of Aragon.

=== War against Al-Andalus ===
Alfonso was a pious prince. He introduced the Cistercians to Iberia by founding a monastery at Fitero. He adopted a militant attitude towards the Moors of Al-Andalus, especially the Almoravids. From 1138, when he besieged Coria, Alfonso led a series of crusades subjugating the Almoravids. After a seven-month siege, he took the fortress of Oreja near Toledo and, as the Chronica Adefonsi Imperatoris tells it:

… early in the morning the castle was surrendered and the towers were filled with Christian knights, and the royal standards were raised above a high tower. Those who held the standards shouted out loud and proclaimed "Long live Alfonso, emperor of León and Toledo!"

In 1142, Alfonso besieged Coria a second time and took it. In 1144, he advanced as far as Córdoba. Two years later, the Almohads invaded and he was forced to refortify his southern frontier and come to an agreement with the Almoravid Yahya ibn Ghaniya for their mutual defence. When Pope Eugene III preached the Second Crusade, Alfonso VII, with García Ramírez of Navarre and Ramon Berenguer IV, led a mixed army of Catalans and Franks, with a Genoese–Pisan navy, in a crusade against the rich port city of Almería, which was occupied in October 1147. A third of the city was granted to Genoa and subsequently leased out to Otto de Bonvillano, a Genoese citizen. It was Castile's first Mediterranean seaport. In 1151, Alfonso signed the Treaty of Tudilén with Ramon Berenguer. The treaty defined the zones of conquest in Andalusia in order to prevent the two rulers from coming into conflict. Six years later, Almería entered into Almohad possession. Alfonso was returning from an expedition against them when he died on 21 August 1157 in Las Fresnedas, north of the Sierra Morena.

== Legacy ==
Alfonso was at once a patron of the church and a protector, though not a supporter of, the Muslims, who were a minority of his subjects. His reign ended in an unsuccessful campaign against the rising power of the Almohads. Though he was not actually defeated, his death in the pass, while on his way back to Toledo, occurred in circumstances which showed that no man could be what he claimed to be – "king of the men of the two religions." Furthermore, by dividing his realm between his sons, he ensured that Christendom would not present the new Almohad threat with a united front.

== Family ==
In November 1128, he married Berenguela, daughter of Ramon Berenguer III, Count of Barcelona. She died in 1149. Their children were:

- Ramón, living 1136, died in childhood
- Sancho III of Castile (1134–1158)
- Ferdinand II of León (1137–1188)
- Constance (c. 1138–1160), married Louis VII of France
- Sancha (c. 1139–1179), married Sancho VI of Navarre
- García (c. 1142–1145/6)
- Alfonso (1144/1148–c. 1149)

In 1152, Alfonso married Richeza of Poland, the daughter of Ladislaus II the Exile. They had:

- Ferdinand (1153–1157)
- Sancha (1155–1208), the wife of Alfonso II of Aragón.

Alfonso also had two mistresses, having children by both. By an Asturian noblewoman named Gontrodo Pérez, he had an illegitimate daughter, Urraca (1132–1164), who married García Ramírez of Navarre, the mother retiring to a convent in 1133.

Later in his reign, he formed a liaison with Urraca Fernández, widow of count Rodrigo Martínez and daughter of Fernando García de Hita, having a daughter, Stephanie (1148–1180), who was killed by her jealous husband, Fernán Ruiz de Castro.

== Family tree ==
Constance of Burgundy	Alfonso VI of León & Castile
Pope; Callixtus II	Raymond of Burgundy	Urraca of León	Alfonso I of Pamplona & Aragon	Teresa of Portugal	Henry of Burgundy
Sancha; Raimúndez	Berengaria of Barcelona	Alfonso VII of León & Castile	Richeza of Poland	Afonso I of Portugal
Sancho III of Castile	Ferdinand II of León	Urraca	García Ramírez of Navarre
Constance	Louis VII of France	Sancha	Sancho VI of Navarre	Sancha	Alfonso II of Aragon

== In fiction ==
A parody version of king Alfonso and queen Berengaria is presented in the tragicomedy La venganza de Don Mendo by Pedro Muñoz Seca. In its film version, Antonio Garisa played Alfonso.

== Bibliography ==
- Barton, Simon (1997). The Aristocracy in Twelfth-century León and Castile. Cambridge: Cambridge University Press. ISBN 9780521497275.
- Bryson, David (1999). Queen Jeanne and the Promised Land: Dynasty, Homeland, Religion and Violence in Sixteenth-Century France. Brill.
- Fletcher, R.A. (1984). Saint James's catapult : the life and times of Diego Gelmírez of Santiago de Compostela. Oxford [Oxfordshire]: Clarendon Press. ISBN 978-0198225812.
- France, John (2005). The Crusades and the Expansion of Catholic Christendom, 1000–1714. Routledge.
- García-Osuna y Rodríguez, José María Manuel (2012). "El rey Alfonso VII «El Emperador» de León". Anuario Brigantino. 35.
- Graham-Leigh, Elaine (2005). The Southern French Nobility and the Albigensian Crusade. The Boydell Press.
- Hanley, Catherine (2019). Matilda: Empress, Queen, Warrior. Yale University Press.
- Lourie, Elena (1975). "The Will of Alfonso I, "El Batallador," King of Aragon and Navarre: A Reassessment". Speculum. 50 (4 Oct): 635–651. doi:10.2307/2855471. JSTOR 2855471. S2CID 159659007.
- Reilly, Bernard F. (2003). "Alfonso VII, King of León and Castile". In E. Michael Gerli (ed.). Medieval Iberia: An encyclopedia. Taylor & Francis. pp. 59–60. ISBN 9781351665780. OCLC 701323223.
- Reilly, Bernard F. (1998). The Kingdom of León-Castilla Under King Alfonso VII, 1126–1157. Philadelphia: University of Pennsylvania Press. ISBN 9780812234527.
- Reilly, Bernard F. (1982). The Kingdom of León-Castilla under Queen Urraca, 1109–1126. Princeton University Press. ISBN 0-691-05344-8.
- Riley-Smith, Jonathan (1990). Atlas of the Crusades. New York: Facts on File. ISBN 9780816021864.
- Powers, James F. (2010). "Coria, Siege of". In Rogers, Clifford J. (ed.). The Oxford Encyclopedia of Medieval Warfare and Military Technology. Vol. 1. Oxford University Press.
- Stroll, Mary (2004). Calixtus II, 1119–1124. Leiden; Boston: Brill. ISBN 9789004139879.
- Waag, Anaïs (2022). "Rulership, Authority, and Power in the Middle Ages: The Porprietary Queen as Head of Dynasty". Anglo-Norman Studies XLIV. Boydell & Brewer. pp. 71–104. ISBN 9781800106314.

Alfonso VII of León and Castile Castilian House of Ivrea Cadet branch of the House of Ivrea Born: 1 March 1105 Died: 21 August 1157
Regnal titles
Preceded by Urraca	King of Galicia; 1111–1157	Succeeded by Ferdinand II
Preceded by Urraca	King of León; 1126–1157	Succeeded by Ferdinand II
Preceded by Urraca	King of Castile; 1126–1157	Succeeded by Sancho III
Preceded by Urraca	Emperor of All Spain; 1126–1157 with Alfonso I of Aragon (1126–1134)	Succeeded by Title abandoned
