= Zafadola =

Ruler of Taifa Rueda de Jalón (1110)

Aḥmad III Abū Jaʿfar ibn ʿAbd al-Malik al-Mustanṣir أحمد الثالث أبو جعفر بن عبد الملك المستنصر

Lord of Rueda de Jalón
- Reign: 1130 – 1131
- Predecessor: Abd al-Malik Imad ad-Dawla
- Successor: -
- Died: 1146
- Dynasty: Hud
- Religion: Sunni Islam

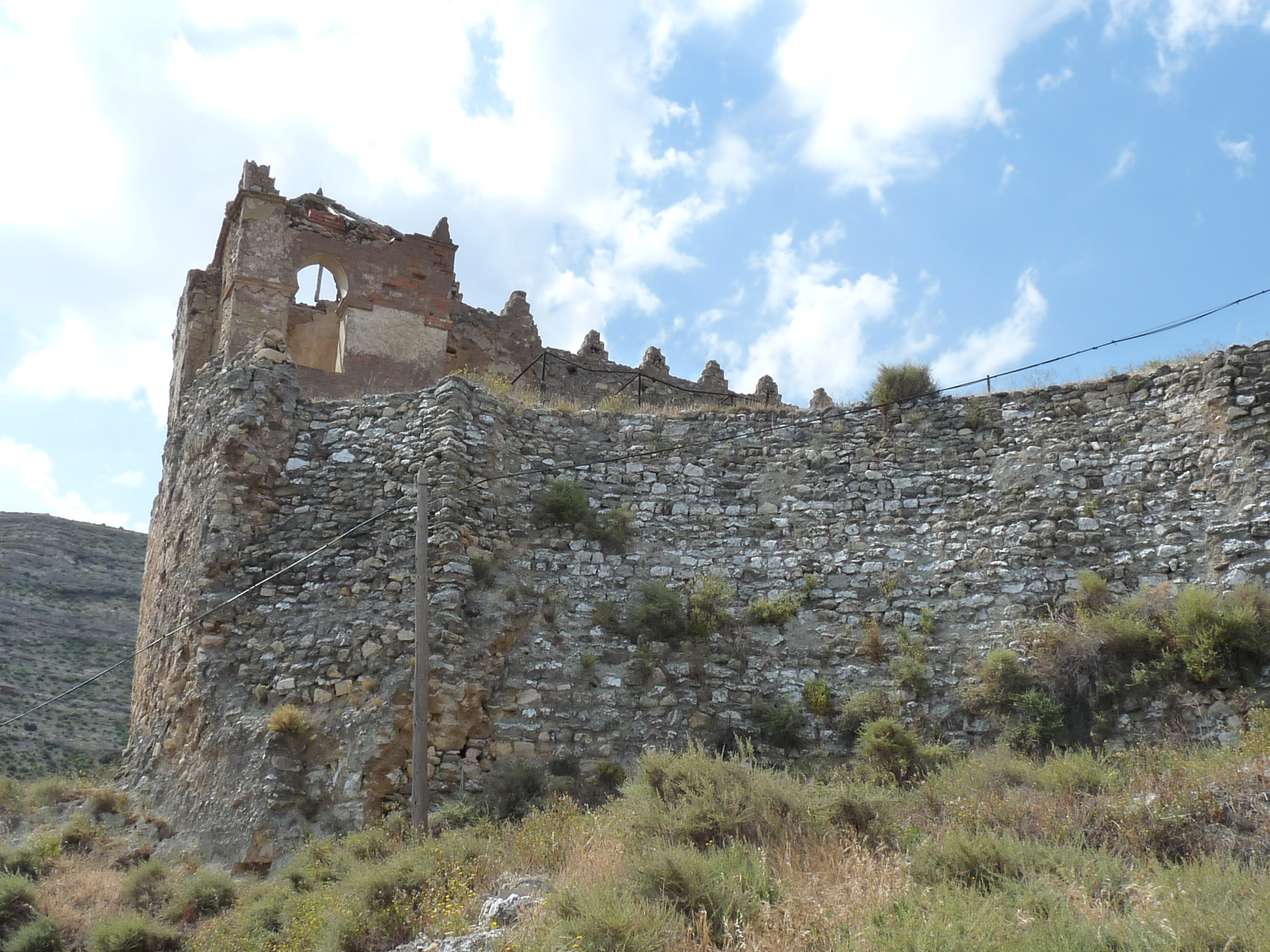
Ruins of the walls of Rueda de Jalón

Aḥmad III Abū Jaʿfar ibn ʿAbd al-Malik al-Mustanṣir (Arabic: أحمد الثالث أبو جعفر بن عبد الملك المستنصر; died 5 February 1146), called Sayf al-Dawla ("Sword of the Dynasty"), Latinised as Zafadola, (Note: The author of the contemporary Chronica Adefonsi imperatoris refers to Sayf al-Dawla as rex Zafadola sarracenorum, "king of the Saracens".) was the last ruler of the Hudid dynasty. He ruled the rump of the taifa kingdom of Zaragoza from his castle at Rueda de Jalón, in what is now Spain. He was the son of Abd al-Malik.

After the city of Zaragoza was conquered by the Almoravids in 1110, ʿAbd al-Malik and Sayf al-Dawla fled to Rueda to resist the invaders. There they received help from Alfonso the Battler, king of Aragon. Their state was reduced to the towns of Rueda and Borja and their hinterland. In 1130 ʿAbd al-Malik died. In 1131 Sayf al-Dawla sent messengers to the court of King Alfonso VII of León to propose his rendering homage to Alfonso. The latter sent an embassy led by Count Rodrigo Martínez and the king's counsellor Gutierre Fernández de Castro to Rueda to make final arrangements. The taifa king and his sons then went to Alfonso, surrendered Rueda to him and became his vassals. Alfonso in turn gave Sayf al-Dawla territory in the Kingdom of Toledo and the task of defending a sector of the southern frontier from the Almoravids.

Sayf al-Dawla took part in battles with the Almoravids in Jaén, Granada and Murcia, and also fought against Alfonso the Battler. In 1135 he attended Alfonso VII's imperial coronation in León. He was defending the southern border in 1146, when Alfonso VII sent some of his leading knights—Manrique de Lara, Ponce de Cabrera and Armengol de Urgel—to assist him. In a dispute with the Christians, Sayf al-Dawla was killed during the battle of Albacete, near Chinchilla de Montearagón.

== Sources ==
- Barton, Simon (1997). The Aristocracy in Twelfth-Century León and Castile. Cambridge Studies in Medieval Life and Thought. Cambridge University Press. ISBN 978-052149727-5.
- Canal Sánchez-Pagín, José María (2003). "El conde Gómez González de Candespina: su historia y su familia". Anuario de Estudios Medievales (in Spanish). 33 (1): 37–68. doi:10.3989/aem.2003.v33.i1.197. Archived from the original on 2017-12-11.
- Catlos, Brian A. (2004). The Victors and the Vanquished: Christians and Muslims of Catalonia and Aragon, 1050–1300. Cambridge Studies in Medieval Life and Thought. Cambridge University Press. ISBN 978-052182234-3.
- García Fitz, Francisco (2004). "¿Una "España musulmana, sometida y tributaria"? la España que no fue" (PDF). Historia. Instituciones. Documentos (in Spanish). 31: 227–48. Archived from the original (PDF) on 2014-08-29.
- García-Osuna Rodríguez, José María Manuel (2012). "El rey Alfonso VII "El emperador" de León" (PDF). Anuario Brigantino (in Spanish). 35: 99–160. Archived from the original (PDF) on August 29, 2014.
- Maíllo Salgado, Felipe; al-Kardabūs, Ibn (2008). Historia de al-Ándalus (in Spanish) (3rd ed.). Madrid: Akal.
- Ubieto Arteta, Antonio (1961). "La Historia Roderici y su fecha de redacción" (PDF). Saitabi: Revista de la Facultat de Geografia i Història (in Spanish). 11: 241–46. Archived from the original (PDF) on 2014-09-05.

Preceded by Abd al-Malik Imad ad-Dawla	Lord of Rueda de Jalón; 1130–1131	Succeeded by Alfonso VII of León and Castile
