= Gutierre Fernández =

Gutierre Fernández may refer to:

- Gutierre Fernández (Leonese nobleman) (fl. 1084 – c. 1117), Leonese nobleman and majordomo to Queen Urraca
- Gutierre Fernández de Castro ([fl. 1124 – c. 1166), nobleman and military commander from the Kingdom of Castile
- Gutierre Fernández (composer) (c. 1547–1623), South American composer and Roman Catholic priest of Spanish birth
