= Beltrán de Risnel =

Aragonese leader

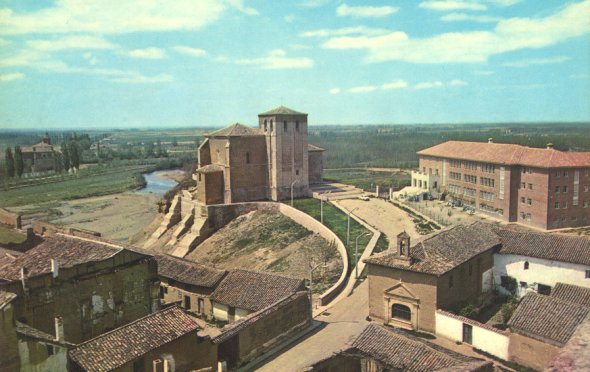
Carrión de los Condes, seat of Beltrán's lordship (nominally from 1113 and recognised in 1117)

Beltrán (or Bertrán) de Risnel, also called Bertrand de Laon (died 17 July 1134), was a French-born Aragonese political and military leader during the reign of Alfonso the Battler, who was his cousin. Beltrán was mainly active in the kingdoms of León and Castile, which Alfonso co-ruled for a time with his wife, Queen Urraca. He received Leonese titles and governed territories in León and Castile on behalf of the crown. He only sporadically attended the court of either King Alfonso or Queen Urraca, but he sometimes acted as a go-between. He became progressively more involved to Leonese court politics, eventually serving Alfonso VII as a count and having a marriage arranged to the king's half-sister. In 1130, he joined his father-in-law in revolt and ended up much reduced in status. He eventually rejoined Alfonso the Battler and died in battle alongside him.

== French origins ==
Beltrán was originally from the County of Champagne. He was related to both the Capetian kings of France and the Jiménez kings of Aragon. His father was Guy de Conflans, castellan of Prény, and his mother was Hildiarde (or Hodiarde), daughter of Thibaud, count of Reynel, and Ermentrude. This Ermentrude was the daughter of Hilduin IV, Count of Montdidier and Lord of Ramerupt, and Alice, heiress of the County of Roucy. Alice was the granddaughter of Hedwig, daughter of King Hugh of France, who was thus the great-great-great grandfather of Beltrán.

Ermentrude's brother, Count Ebles II of Roucy, campaigned in Spain in 1073, and their sister, Felicia, married King Sancho of Aragon, father of Alfonso the Battler. Beltrán and Alfonso were thus first cousins once removed. Another sibling of Ermentrude's, Beatrice, married Geoffrey II, Count of Perche, and was the mother of Count Rotrou III, who also served Alfonso in Spain between 1123 and 1131. Rotrou and Beltrán were also first cousins once removed.

According to the Genealogy of Foigny, Beltrán had three brothers—Ebles, Robert and William (called Rofroidus)—and a sister, Beatrice. Ebles was lord of Montfort in the Ornois and castellan of Bussy; he founded the Abbey of Vaux-en-Ornois. Robert inherited Conflans-en-Jarnisy. Beatrice married Hugues de Montcornet and later Clarembaud du Marché de Laon.

== Arrival in Castile ==
Beltrán arrived in Castile in the entourage of his cousin, Alfonso of Aragon, who appointed him governor of Logroño in June 1112 and of Carrión de los Condes in 1113, charges he was still executing as late as 1125. A document dated to 27 October 1112 and preserved in the Gallican Cartulary of Valpuesta, records that Beltrán was count in Término and Pancorbo.

Following Luis de Salazar y Castro, some modern historians have suggested that Beltrán may have come to Castile in the company of two other foreign magnates—Aimery II of Narbonne and Ermengol VI of Urgell—in the following of Pedro González de Lara, then the lover of Queen Urraca and enemy of Alfonso. Pedro was returning from an exile in the County of Barcelona, where he had fled from Alfonso after the latter besieged him in Monzón. The date of this exile, however, is too late (1115).

The county of Carrión under Beltrán did not corresponded in extension to the same county held by Pedro Ansúrez during the reign of Queen Urraca's father, Alfonso VI. This county lay along the River Carrión from Saldaña to twenty-five kilometres south and along the Way of Saint James for thirty kilometres until Melgar de Fernamental in the east. It is unclear from contemporary records whether these lands formed a part of Castile or the Campo Gótico, which was a region of León. In early 1113 they were effectively under the control of Alfonso the Battler. Beltrán's county did not include Saldaña, which was ruled by Pedro Ansúrez until the end of 1117 and by Pedro López de Monforte afterwards (at least from November 1119 until March 1125). In the spring of 1113, Urraca recovered Carrión. Later, between 1121 and 1122, Alfonso was in control of it again. Throughout these changes, Beltrán continued to govern Carrión.

== In the service of Urraca ==
Between 1113 and 1115 Beltrán was with the court of Urraca, where he was recognised as a count. Since this was a period of open warfare between the estranged spouses, Beltrán's presence at Urraca's court probably indicates that he was acting as a diplomat. He was negotiating with the queen on behalf of Alfonso as late as 13 March 1115. By late April Alfonso had come to Sahagún to meet personally with the queen, both his wife and his rival. The king placed Beltrán in command of the city and forced the abbot of Sahagún to make peace with him. In 1116 Beltrán was holding Monzón.

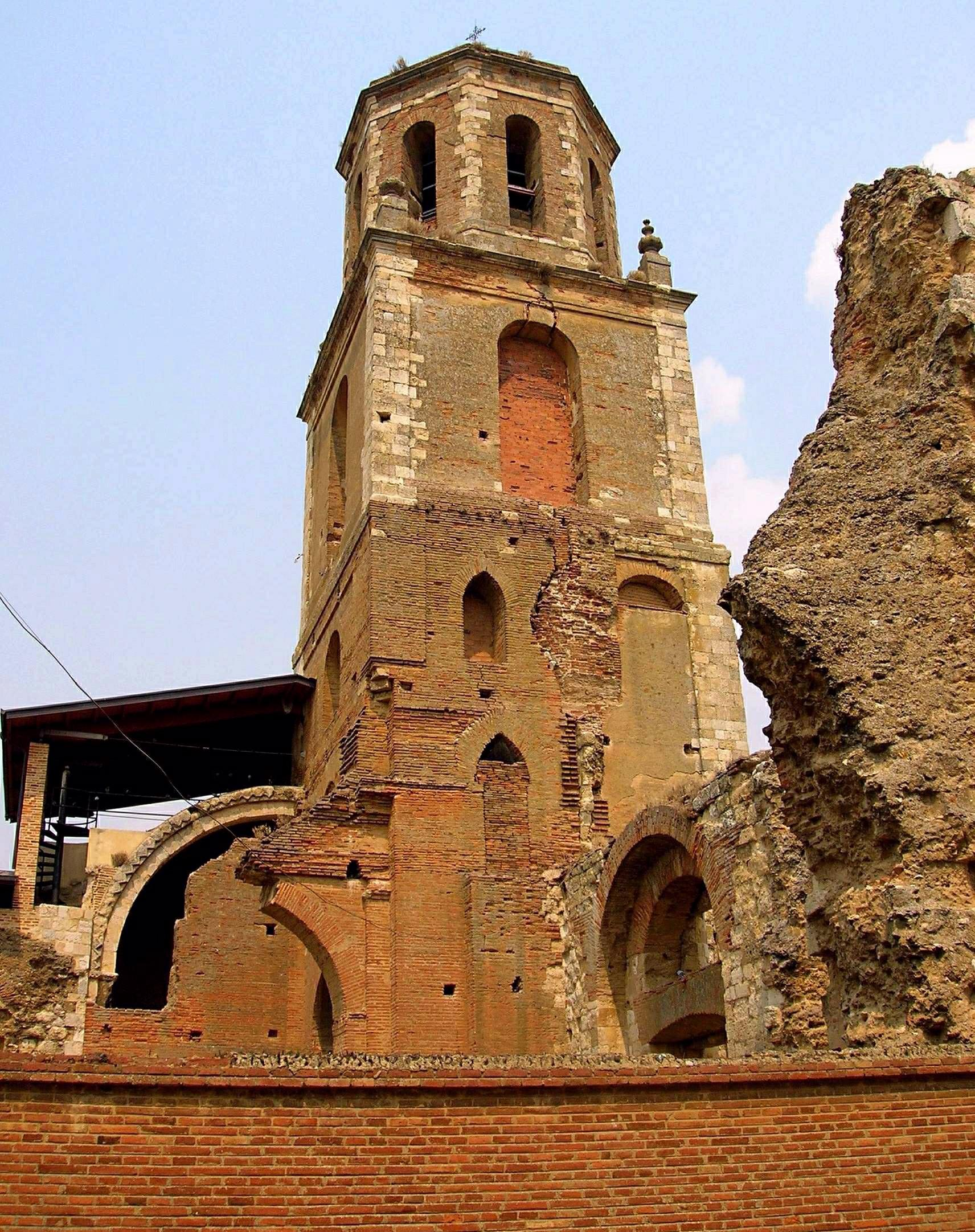
The clocktower of the monastery of Sahagún. Beltrán had extensive relations with the monastery, even settling a lawsuit between it and the town. The anonymous chronicle of the monastery is an important source for Beltrán's early career.

According to the First Anonymous Chronicle of Sahagún, in February 1117 the synod of Burgos appointed Beltrán assertor (advocate) of the exiled inhabitants of Sahagún in a lawsuit against the monks of the local monastery heard before the archbishop of Toledo, Bernard. The chronicle is scathing in its account of Beltrán, whom it accuses of leading the burghers of Sahagún to lie. The synod also made bishops Hugh of Oporto and Pascal of Burgos responsible for the satisfaction of the monks' claims against the burghers and for the return of the latter to their homes. This is representative of the peace then reigning between Alfonso and Urraca, since the former was thereby recognising Pascal as rightful bishop of Burgos and the latter recognised Beltrán as legitimate count of Carrión.

In 1119 Beltrán was again present at the queen's court, possibly throughout the attempted coup of Gutierre Fernández in July. On 8 October Beltrán and Pedro Fróilaz de Traba witnessed a charter of the young heir and co-regent, Alfonso VII, for the monastery of Sahagún. Beltrán confirmed two more charters of Alfonso VII during Urraca's reign: on 1 November 1124 and 19 January 1125.

Urraca died in 1126 and was succeeded by Alfonso VII. Early in Alfonso's reign, at least from June 1126, Beltrán was governing a new fief, Abia de las Torres. In 1127, the two Alfonsos, kings of Aragon and Castile–León, signed the Peace of Támara, following which Alfonso VII made Beltrán the governor of Burgos.

== Marriages and children ==
The First Anonymous Chronicle of Sahagún record that Beltrán's first wife was Urraca Muñoz, probably a sister of Jimena Muñoz (the lover of King Alfonso VI) and of Count Rodrigo Muñoz. She was the widow of Count Gómez González, who had died leading the queen's forces against the Aragonese at the Battle of Candespina on 26 October 1111. According to the chronicle, Beltrán was first called count because of his marriage to the count's widow. He was imprisoned by Rodrigo Muñoz, but was released through the queen's intervention.

Beltrán's second marriage probably took place in 1128 or 1129. His second wife was Elvira Pérez, illegitimate daughter of Queen Urraca and Pedro González de Lara, who is first mentioned in a document of 1117, her parents probably having been lovers only from 1112. This marriage was probably arranged by the Emperor Alfonso VII. Elvira, born towards 1113, was already a widow, her first husband, García Pérez de Traba, having died. Because of her illegitimacy, Elvira was not referred to as infanta, which allows here to be distinguished from her aunt, the infanta Elvira, Countess of Toulouse, with whom she is sometimes confused. At the time of their marriage, which had taken place by 1130, Alfonso granted Elvira the vills of Nogal and Olmillos, located on the Way of Saint James in northern Castile. In January 1168 Elvira donated the vills to the monastery of Sahagún in León. Also at the time of their marriage, Alfonso granted the title of count to Beltrán.

According to the aforementioned Genealogy of Foigny, written about 1161, Beltrán "had by a daughter of the emperor of Spain children of both sexes" (quia de filia imperatoris Hispanie habuit liberos utriusque sexus), but it does not name them. A certain María Beltrán who married Íñigo Jiménez, Lord of Cameros, as his second wife may have been a daughter of Beltrán.

== Father-in-law's revolt ==
In 1130 the Laras, rose in revolt against the Emperor in favour of installing as king Beltrán's brother-in-law, Elvira's full brother, Fernando Pérez de Lara, son of Urraca and Pedro. Beltrán joined his father-in-law in revolt and together they captured the city of Palencia (or possibly Palenzuela). In June, the Emperor besieged Palencia (or Palenzuela), capturing Pedro and forcing Beltrán to negotiate. The Chronica Adefonsi imperatoris, which accuses Pedro and Beltrán of "causing much disorder in the kingdom", records that they were put in chains in prison in the city of León until they had surrendered all their castles and cities.

Although initially disgraced, after his release he continued to subscribe royal charters down to 1133, although he was never again a resident at Alfonso VII's court. As late as 1131 he was still holding Castrojeriz.

== Death in battle ==
Beltrán joined Alfonso the Battler's final military expedition against the Muslim city of Fraga. He died in the Battle of Fraga on 17 July 1134, and the king died shortly after. The contemporary English chronicler Orderic Vitalis records that at Fraga the king ordered Beltrán to charge the enemy's camels. When Beltrán advised caution, the king accused him of cowardice and Beltrán promptly led a charge. The camels fled, but the pursuers were subsequently ambushed and massacred. The Chronica Adefonsi imperatoris records that Beltrán (Beltran de Lannuces) was among the leaders at Fraga and that all the leaders were killed.

Beltrán's posthumous reputation can be gauged from line 3004 of the Poema de mio Cid, written towards the year 1200. There he is placed in the second tier of nobility, immediately beneath Alfonso VI, Henry of Portugal, and Raymond of Galicia, and beside Fruela Díaz. This is the beginning of the ahistorical "Cortes de Carrión" passage. While Beltrán had no known connection to any of these figures, he was connected with the event through his rule of Carrión and through his familial relations with the Lara, probably patrons of the Mio Cid poet:

Llegaba el plazo, querien ir a la Cort, en los primeros va el buen rey don Alfonso, el conde don Anric y el conde don Remond: aqueste fue el padre del buen enperador: el conde don Fruella y el conde don Beltrán. Fueron y de su reino otros muchos Sabidores, de toda Castiella todos los meiores.	The time arrived, they wished to go to Court, among the first went the good king Alfonso, the count don Henry and the don Raymond: that one was the father of the good emperor: the count don Fruela and the count don Bertrand. They went and from the realm many other Wise Men, from all Castile all the greatest.
