= Gutierre Fernández de Castro =

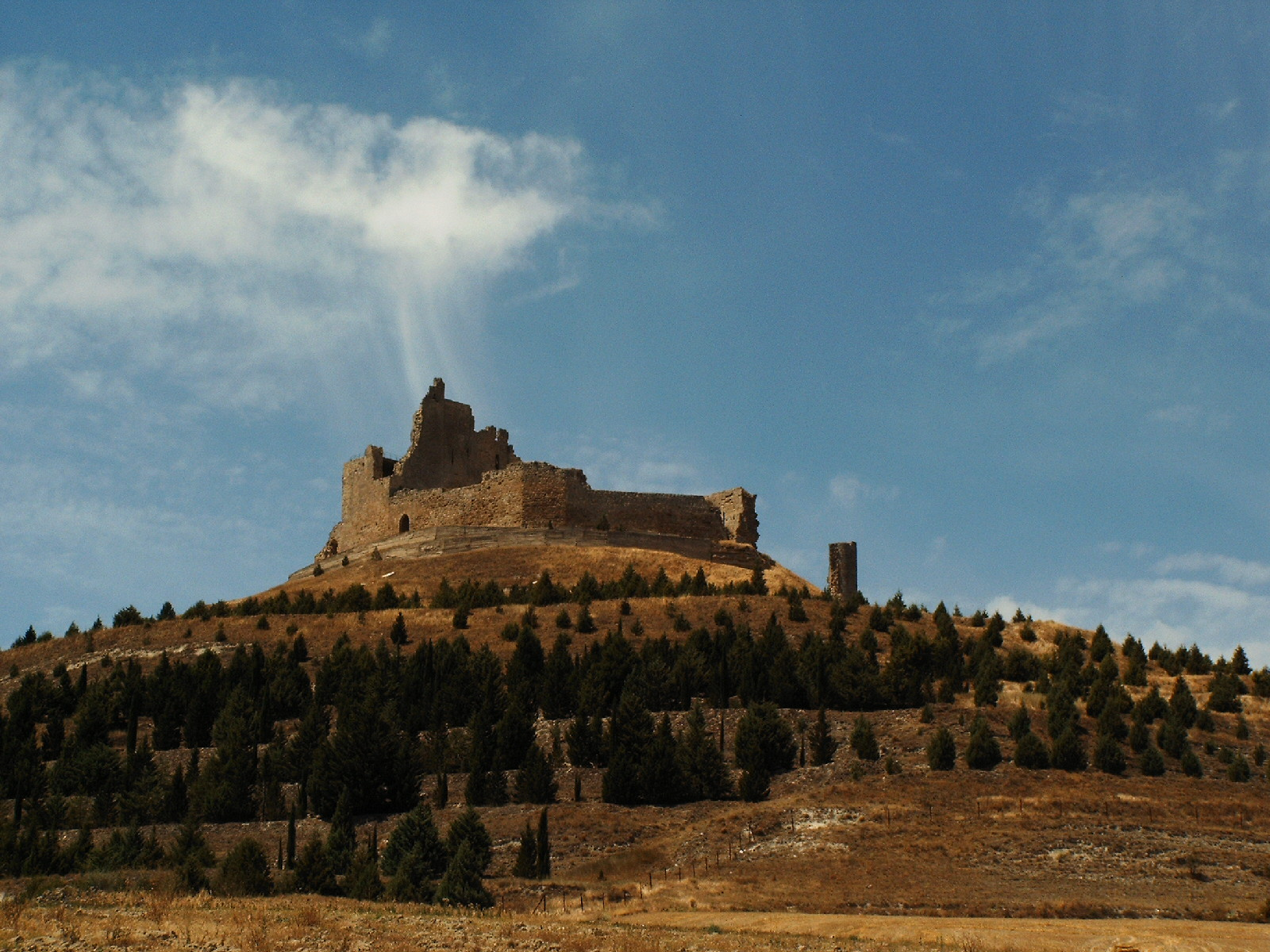
Ruins of the castle of Castrojeriz, which Gutierre helped to besiege in 1131 and which he later held as a fief of the crown from 1140 until 1166. The Castro name derives from this place: Gutierre's parents owned land in the village.

Gutierre Fernández de Castro (Note: The toponymic surname "de Castro" is not contemporary, but was added later by historians, cf. Salazar y Acha 1991, p. 35 n. 4. The Basque-style patronym "Fernández", meaning "son of Fernando [Ferdinand]", is found in contemporary Latin documents in an array of variations: Fernandez, Fernandiz, Ferrandez, Ferrandiz, Frenandez, Fredenandiz and the Latinised form Fernandi (meaning "of Fernandus"). His first (baptismal) name is likewise found in contemporary documents in many variations: Goter, Guter, Guthier, Guterius, Guterrus, Guterrius, Gutterrius and Guteirrius. Some modern historians render it Guter or Gutier, rather than the most common modern Spanish form, Gutierre.) ([fl. 1124 – c. 1166) was a nobleman and military commander from the Kingdom of Castile. His career in royal service corresponds exactly with the reigns of Alfonso VII (1126–57) and his son Sancho III (1157–58). He served Alfonso as a courtier after 1134 and as majordomo (1135–38). He was the guardian and tutor the young Sancho III from 1145. Before his death he was also briefly the guardian of Sancho's infant son, Alfonso VIII.

Gutierre took part in several military campaigns of reconquest against the Almoravid Emirate to the south of Castile. In 1139, on the king's orders, he began the successful Siege of Oreja. More often he was occupied defending the eastern frontier from invasion by Aragon or Navarre, and for this purpose the king invested him with many royal fiefs in this region. Towards the end of his life Gutierre was the elder statesman of the Castro family, and he died before his family's rivalry with the Laras developed into open civil war early in the reign of Alfonso VIII. Despite his high standing at court and his illustrious military career, Gutierre was never promoted to the rank of a count, which was the highest title borne by the Castilian aristocracy in the twelfth century.

== Family and early life ==
Gutierre, who could not have been born much earlier than 1100, was the eldest son of Fernando García de Hita and his first wife, Tegridia, a relative of the powerful Count Pedro Ansúrez. He had one full brother, Rodrigo Fernández. Gutierre was probably the elder brother. After 1125 their father, Fernando, disappears from the record. Although his death is not recorded, his sons went without him to make their submission to the new king, Alfonso VII, in 1126, after the death of Queen Urraca. According to the Chronica Adefonsi imperatoris ("Chronicle of the Emperor Alfonso"), (Note: Alfonso took the title "emperor" in 1135 to emphasise his rule over multiple kingdoms. Besides Castile, he ruled León, Galicia and Toledo, and received homage from the Kings of Navarre.) a contemporary history of Alfonso's reign, Gutierre and Rodrigo were accompanied not by their father, but by their uncle, García Garcés de Aza. Although some authors have suggested that Gutierre was an upstart, both he and his brother obtained advantageous marriages to daughters of the highest nobility years before rising to prominence at the royal court and were evidently considered high-born.

In the early 1120s, Gutierre married a woman from the county of Álava, Toda Díaz, (Note: Also Tota Díez, or Theoda in more proper Latin.) daughter of Diego Sánchez, and Enderquina Álvarez, the daughter of Álvar Díaz de Oca and Teresa Ordóñez. She was born before 1109, since by that year her father was dead. On 5 November 1124, Gutierre and Toda received half of the lands owned by her grandmother, Teresa, at Quintanilla Rodano, Quintana Fortuno and Sotopalacios. In 1125, Gutierre and his wife promulgated a fuero (a feudal statute) governing their estate at San Cebrián de Campos. It is the only preserved non-royal fuero from the reign of Urraca. The fuero enumerated the tenants' liabilities. They owed various services (sernas) two days a month on the demesne. These included ploughing, reaping, threshing, digging and pruning. Their lord was to provide them with bread and wine during their every serna, but he only owed them meat on eight of the twenty-four sernas during the year. Tenants had to provide mandadería (messenger duty) once a year at most. If the message took more than one day to deliver, the lord would provide food. The penalty for failure to provide services was a fine. Besides San Cebrián, Gutierre held land at Castrojeriz, his family's "traditional stronghold", where his father and mother had held substantial properties and whence the family derived its name. He also owned land at Arconada.

There is some confusion between Gutierre de Castro and an earlier Gutierre Fernández (flourished 1089–1117), who was Queen Urraca's majordomo. The medievalist Agustín Ubieto Arteta maintains that Gutierre was a page or squire (Latin armiger, perhaps alférez) to King Alfonso VI (1065–1109), which is chronologically impossible. He says that he served Queen Urraca as majordomo and was a tutor to a young Alfonso VII, but in this he is confusing the head of the Castro with the earlier Gutierre. The American historian Bernard Reilly also confuses the majordomo of Alfonso VII with the earlier majordomo of Urraca. Early modern historians, like Esteban de Garibay y Zamalloa and Prudencio de Sandoval, also confused the two, having been misled by thirteenth- and fourteenth-century historians. The earliest of these, Lucas of Tuy, says that shortly after 1100, King Alfonso I of Aragon and Navarre attacked the church of San Isidoro de León in order to take its precious stones and gold and silver treasures, but the church was successfully defended by Gutierre Fernández, the "heir of Castile" (heredero de Castilla). Although Lucas believed this person to be Gutierre de Castro, it is chronologically impossible, since the latter would have been only a young child at most. Shortly after Lucas wrote, Rodrigo Jiménez de Rada, in his Historia de rebus Hispaniae ("History of Spanish Things"), says that Gutierre Fernández de Castro and Gómez González de Manzanedo defended the rights of the magnates against Count Pedro González de Lara, the lover of Queen Urraca. Elaborating on the story of Rodrigo Jiménez a century later, the Primera Crónica General ("First General Chronicle") associates Gutierre with proclaiming Alfonso VII king in opposition to his mother, Urraca, although that was done by Count Pedro Fróilaz de Traba.

== Alfonso VII's court ==
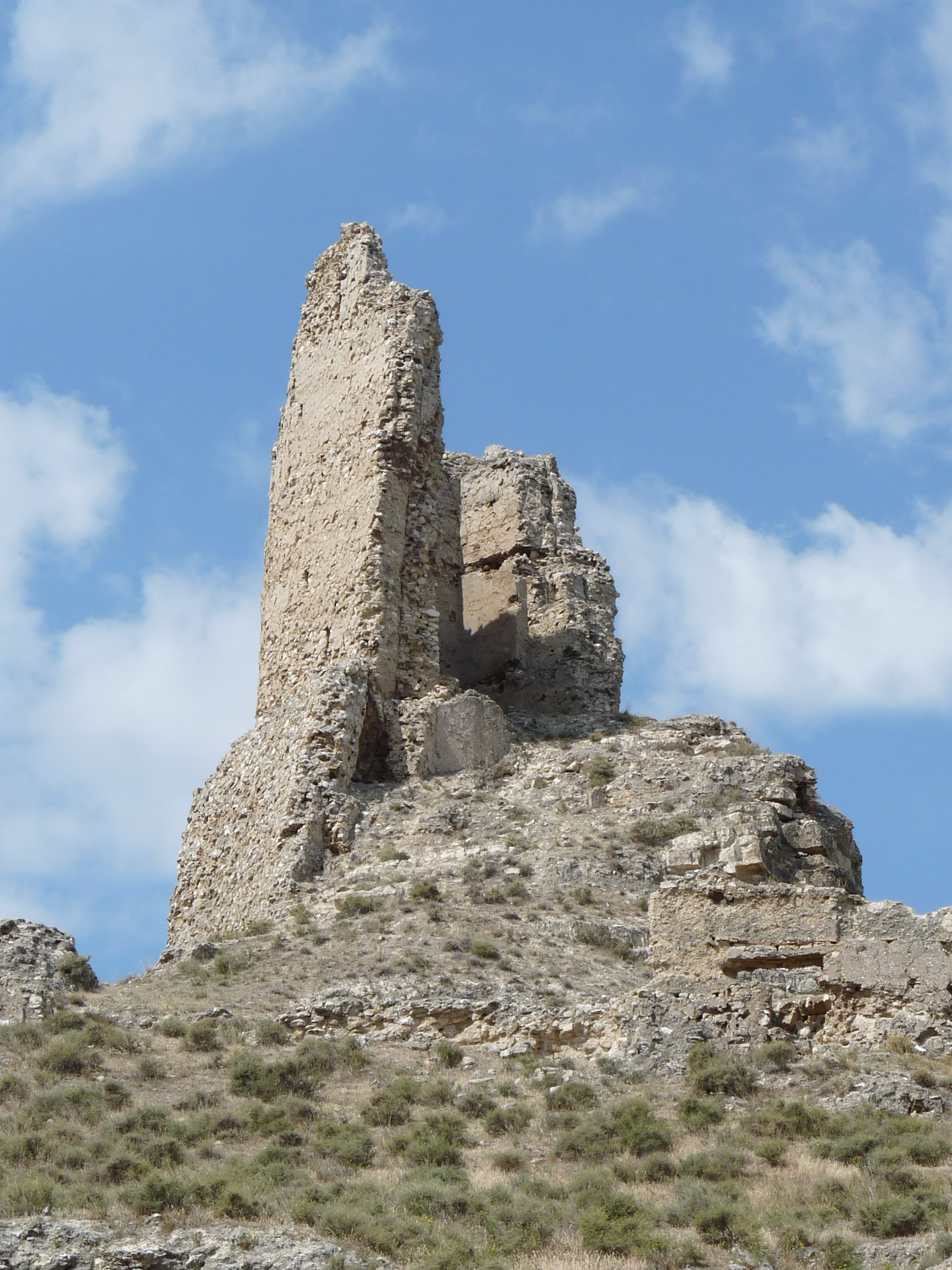
Ruins of the castle of Rueda de Jalón, where Gutierre met Sayf al-Dawla and which he later held for Alfonso VII

Gutierre did not regularly attend Alfonso VII's court until 1134, but from then until the end of his reign he subscribed as a witness to 497 of 807 known royal charters. Contemporary documents refer to him as "great in the imperial court" (magnus in corte imperatoris). The earliest appearance of Gutierre with the King Alfonso's court was on the occasion of a royal donation to the church of Burgos on 12 July 1128. Gutierre signed the donation in the first column, immediately after the four counts who were present (Pedro González de Lara and his brother Rodrigo González, Rodrigo Martínez and Pedro López). From the beginning of his public career he was preeminent among nobles of the second rank (that is, not counts). His first important public duty, in 1131, was a diplomatic mission to Sayf al-Dawla, the Muslim lord of Rueda de Jalón, who wanted Alfonso's protection from the invading Almoravids of Morocco. According to the Chronica Adefonsi imperatoris:

King Zafadola [Sayf al-Dawla] sent ambassadors to the King of León with this message: "Lend me some of your nobles with whom I may come to you in safety." Alfonso was very happy to hear this, and he quickly sent Count Rodrigo Martínez and Gutier Fernández to Zafadola. The latter noble was one of the King's counselors. When they arrived in Rota [Rueda] they were received honorably by King Zafadola. He presented them with magnificent gifts, and then he traveled to the King of León accompanied by them.

Gutierre became Alfonso's majordomo in early 1135 (certainly by February) and he held the office until the autumn of 1138. He is last recorded with the title in a royal charter of 24 October 1138. Alfonso rewarded him for his services by granting some heritable properties at Valderrama to Gutierre and his wife and to his wife's sister, Sancha Díaz de Frías, and her husband, Pedro González. The duties of the majordomo (Latin maiordomus, Spanish mayordomo) are not well known, but he was clearly the highest-ranking of the officers of the court. Traditionally, he was probably in charge of the organization of the court and perhaps also the administration of the royal demesne, but the title may have been largely honorific by the twelfth century, with day-to-day responsibilities delegated to a deputy or submaiordomus. His term as majordomo presented Gutierre opportunities to travel throughout all of Alfonso's realms. In the summer of 1137 he and his brother Rodrigo joined the royal expedition to defend Galicia from a Portuguese invasion. On 26–7 June 1137 Gutierre was at Tuy, after it was reconquered from the Portuguese, and on 29 June he visited Santiago de Compostela. In the autumn of that year he had accompanied the court across the realm to the eastern frontier, where he was at Logroño on 3 October, back at Burgos, the capital of Castile, on 20 October and at Nájera, capital of the Rioja, on 29 October.

On 22 February 1140 Gutierre and his brother Rodrigo were at Carrión de los Condes to witness the treaty between Alfonso and Count Raymond Berengar IV of Barcelona. In León on 24 June 1144, King García Ramírez of Navarre married Alfonso's illegitimate daughter, Urraca the Asturian. Gutierre was probably in attendance, since he and Rodrigo Gómez led the honour guard that accompanied the new couple back to Garcías capital of Pamplona after the Leonese ceremonies. A second set of celebrations was then held in Pamplona, as described by the Chronica Adefonsi imperatoris: "King García prepared a royal feast for the Castilians and for all the knights and officers of his kingdom. The celebration lasted several days. When it was over, the King gave magnificent gifts to the Castilian nobles, and each of them returned to his land."

Gutierre was almost constantly at the royal court again in 1146–47, when Alfonso led a major campaign of reconquest against the Muslim territories of the south. Some time before 1151 the village of Cántavos requested the municipal council of Almazán and Gutierre to settle disputes and determine the boundaries of the village. On 18 December 1152, Gutierre was part of the council that advised Alfonso VII on his revision of the fueros of Sahagún.

== Tenancies ==
Gutierre held several important fiefs (tenencias) from the crown, mainly in eastern Castile, near the frontier with Navarre. On account of his court attendance and military activities, his supervision of these territories must usually have been indirect. His first major tenancy was Calahorra, a city that had once been a part of Navarre and which was located just north of the Navarrese town of Tudela. He replaced Count Rodrigo Martínez—his co-envoy to Sayf al-Dawla in 1131—as fief-holder in Calahorra in 1140. There is ample evidence of Gutierre's methods of indirect rule in Calahorra. As early as 26 February 1140 he had appointed one Martín Fernández his alcalde (Note: Or alcaide, from the Arabic qāʾid, meaning "commander.) (mayor or local magistrate). A private charter of 1 March 1142 cites a four-person council (the alcaldes de concejo) sharing in the government of Calahorra. Martín Fernández was probably a relative of Gutierre's, from the house of Ansúrez. Eight private documents between 1 April 1139 (probably mis-dated) and 1151 cite Martín as tenant (tenens) or vicar (vicarius) of Calahorra under Gutierre. Gutierre continued to hold Calahorra down to at least 27 February 1152. The next tenant, Fortún López, had been appointed by 6 July 1152. He may have been a confidante of Gutierre, and had previously held the city under the rule of Alfonso I of Aragon and Navarre until 1134.

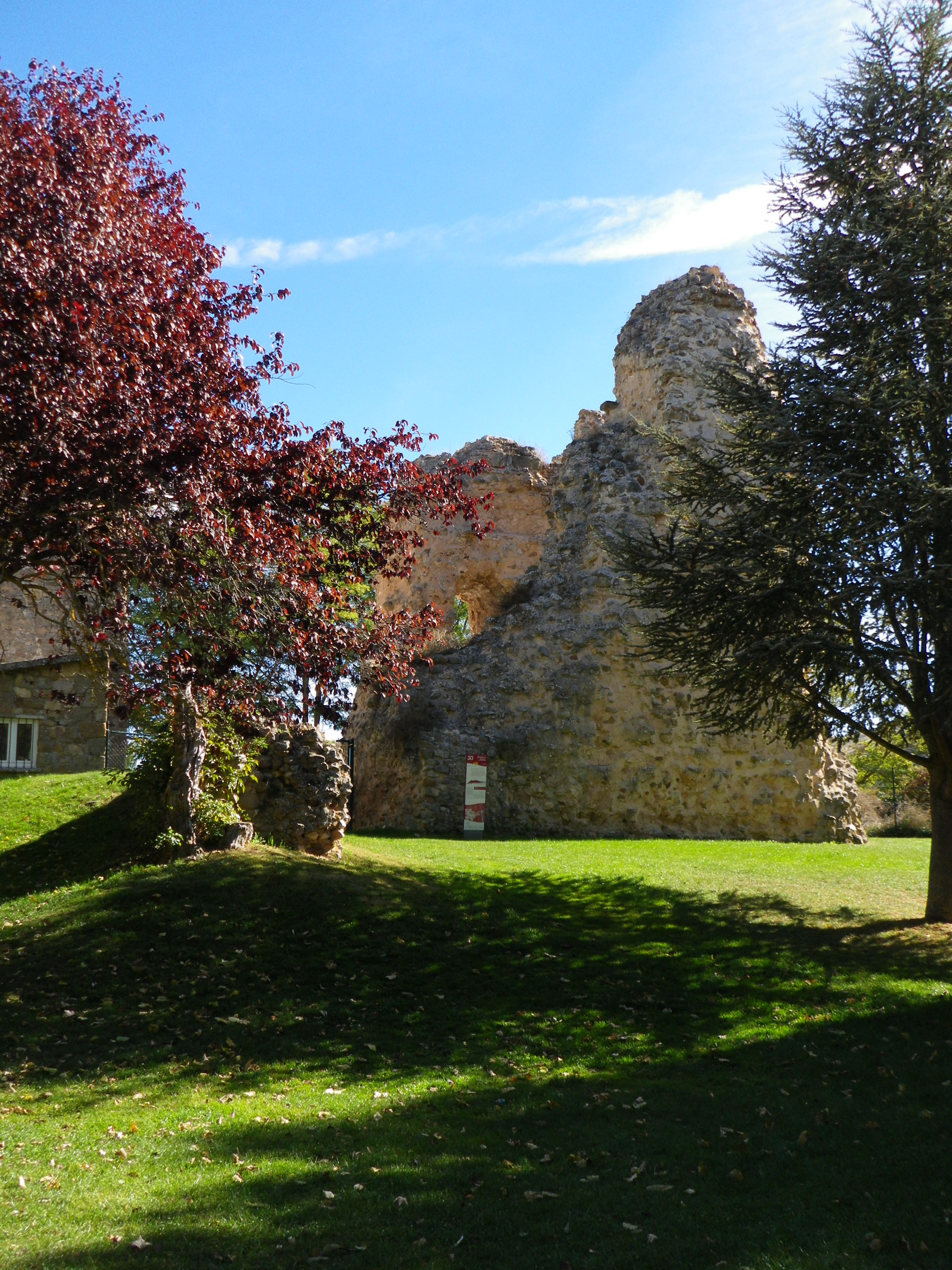
The ruins of the castle of Soria, which was commanded by Gutierre in 1140–50

Gutierre may have held the fortress of Castrojeriz—where he also held property—as early as 23 August 1132. The evidence for his tenancy there is not entirely reliable: four imperfectly preserved royal charters of 1140, 1154 and 1155. There is, however, one original charter from 1146 that records that Gutierre then held Amaya, Burgos and Castrojeriz. There are three further private charters that name him as holding the fortress of Amaya (50 km northwest of Burgos) between 23 April 1148 and 1156, as well as two defective royal charters from 1148. He may have been alcalde of Burgos.

Between 1140 and 1150 seven royal charters and one private document name Gutierre as "lord in Soria" (domino in Soria), and he may have held it down to 1152 at least. As of 26 July 1148, Gutierre had accepted a co-tenant in Soria: Fortún López. About the same time (1148), he received the lordship of Roa de Duero. He may even have been appointed "commander" (adelantado) of the diocese of Osma. In 1145–46 he was lord of Arnedo. In 1148–49 he held the fortress of Rueda de Jalón, which had been surrendered to Alfonso VII after Gutierre's embassy to Sayf al-Dawla in 1131. This fortress lay only 35 km west of Zaragoza, which Raymond Berengar of Barcelona held as a vassal of Alfonso. At about this time contemporary charters begin to record his preeminence in the Castilian heartlands, Old Castile. He is referred to as "prince of Castile" (princeps Castelle) in imperial diplomas and in private documents. He was not usually called a prince (an informal title), and he never held the formal rank of count; his most common title in royal documents was simply "potentate" (potestas). This title was employed without any reference to a tenancy between 1143 and 1150. A later series of documents calls him "potentate (or authority) in Castile" (potestas in Castella) between 1156 and 1158, probably indicating a new administrative role in Old Castile in conjunction with the succession events of 1157 and 1158. A fuero promulgated by the abbot of Santa María de Husillos on 21 November 1160 refers to the authority Gutierre still possessed in Castile at that time.

Towards the end of Alfonso's reign, Gutierre acquired several fiefs in the region around Palencia. Private documents refer to him as tenant of Villagarcía de Campos (21 February 1154), Monzón de Campos (19 September 1154) and Carrión de los Condes (1156). In each of these he had a co-tenant (Diego Muñoz in Carrión). suggesting that, as a curial figure and career soldier, his interest in these lands—far from the frontier—was primarily fiscal: they provided him an income from the royal fisc. Like most aristocrats of his day, Gutierre used the wealth derived from his private properties and his royal tenancies to make numerous donations to churches and monasteries. In his private transactions he was usually accompanied by his wife, Toda. Together they re-founded the monasteries of San Salvador de El Moral—where Toda's grandmother, Teresa, had retired as a nun—and San Cristóbal de Ibeas. On 5 April 1139, Bishop Simon III of Burgos ceded the monastery of El Moral to Gutierre, keeping for himself the right of episcopal oversight. That same day, Gutierre and Toda granted the monastery freedom from all civil authority save the crown and introduced the Benedictine rule into it. With Toda's sister, Mayor, and her husband, Rodrigo Muñoz de Guzmán, Gutierre and Toda donated several properties the sisters had inherited to the abbot of the San Cristóbal at Ibeas de Juarros on 20 February 1151. This private donation took place in the presence of the royal court, while Alfonso VII was preparing for a potential intervention in Navarre. The charter of donation was witnessed by the king and many of the court, indicating the stature of Gutierre in Castile. By November of that year Gutierre had introduced the Premonstratensian Order into Ibeas.

On 23 January 1158 Gutierre held the tenancies of Cervera, Mudave and Piedras Negras. He continued to hold Castrojeriz until his death, being cited as lord there for the last time on 9 July 1166.

== Military activities ==
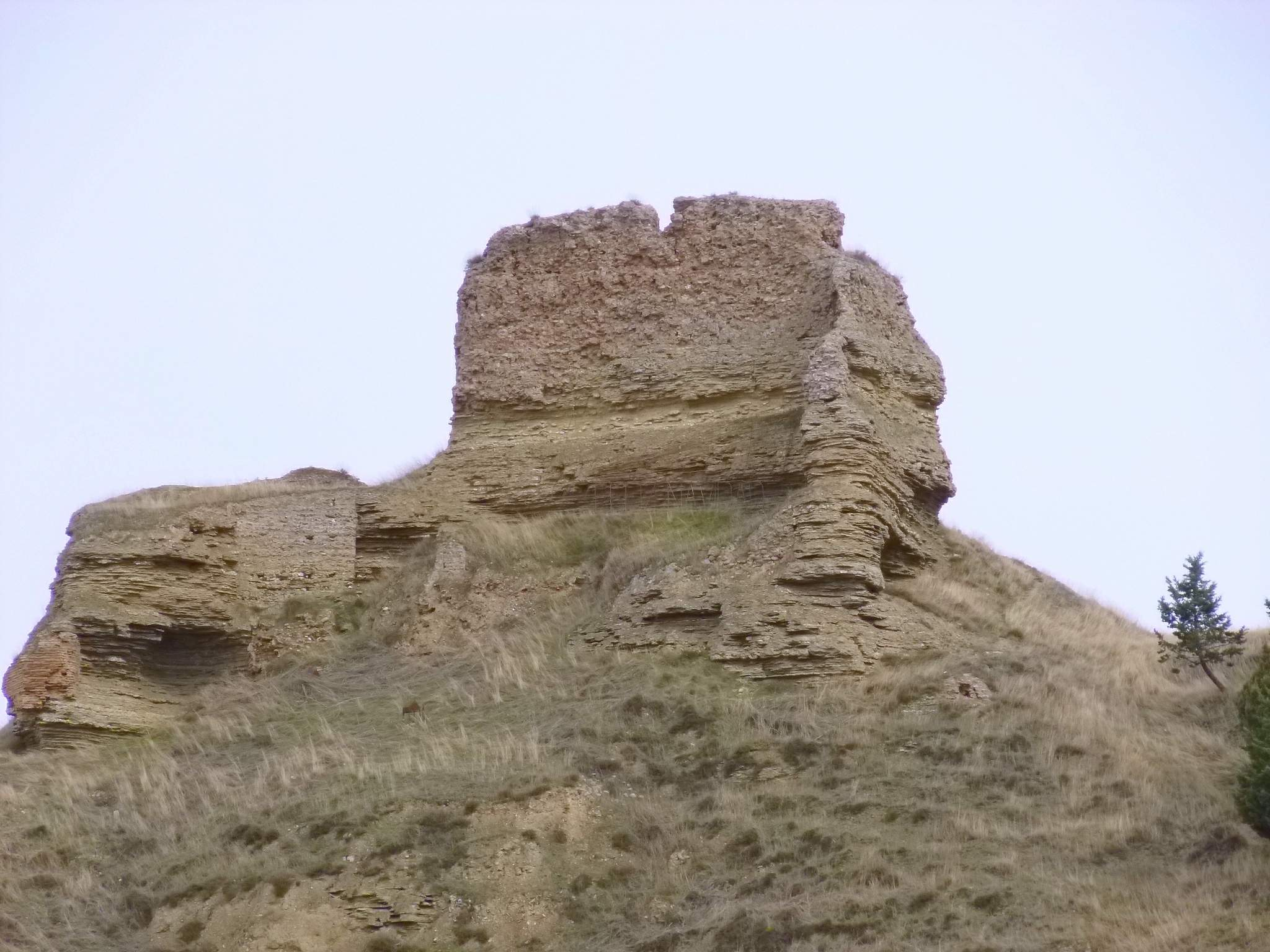
Ruins of the castle of Belorado, taken from the king of Aragon by Gutierre in 1133

Gutierre's first recorded military actions were in the war with Aragon in the early 1130s. He was at the siege of Castrojeriz in September 1131, in which the Castilian forced the Aragonese to surrender that fortress. He led the Castilian armies that captured Belorado, Montes de Oca and Grañón from Aragon by 1133. In June and July 1137 he participated in Alfonso's successfully campaign against the Portuguese to Galicia.

In 1139, on the king's orders, Gutierre and his brother Rodrigo began the siege of Oreja, an Almoravid fortress. The brothers were permitted to muster the cavalry and infantry contingents of the Trans-Sierra and Trans-Duero (Extremadura). This probably included at least the municipal militias of Ávila, Salamanca, Segovia and Toledo. In April, with these troops and their own knightly retinues (mesnadas), they invested Oreja. The king arrived at the siege in July with troops from Castile, Galicia and León. This was immediately after Gutierre had re-founded the monastery at El Moral. On 25 July, Gutierre was with the king at Oreja, and he followed him south when the royal court visited Toledo on 14 August. By 7 September he and the king had returned to Oreja. Gutierre remained until late October or early November, when the Almoravids surrendered.

Gutierre Fernández, Count Rodrigo Gómez and Lope López prosecuted the war against Navarre in 1140. In 1144 Gutierre took part in the king's raid into Almoravid territory. In 1146 he was present at the first siege of Córdoba. In December that year he had joined the royal court at Arévalo in preparation for the major campaign against Almería that Alfonso was planning. Estimating from the eyewitness account of Caffaro di Rustico da Caschifellone, most great lords had a following of 30–40 knights during the Almería campaign of 1147. Gutierre was probably no different. The epic Poem of Almería recounts his personal participation with his knights: "Gutier Fernández arrived shortly thereafter. He himself was royal tutor. Sancho, the first-born son of our Emperor, was assigned to Gutier to be educated. He instructs him with careful attention. He wishes him to surpass everyone. Gutier receives the highest honors. He approaches the battle in person with masses of troops." Gutierre's constant presence with the royal army is attested by the charters issued during its progress towards Almería. His presence at the siege itself is proved by his subscription to the royal charters issued at Baeza of 19 August—before the siege—and 25 November, while the royal army was returning from its success.

In 1150 Gutierre participated in the second siege of Córdoba, and in 1151 he helped besiege Jaén. Gutierre probably jointed Alfonso's expedition against Andújar, Pedroche and Santa Eufemia in 1155. With the militia of Burgos, he defended Calahorra from an Aragonese attack in 1159, when he was an old man. In his illustrious military career, he is reported to have dubbed as many as 500 knights.

== Sancho III's court ==
Gutierre's close relationship with Sancho III began during his father's reign. Perhaps as early as 1134, the year of Sancho's birth, and certainly by 22 April 1145, Gutierre and his wife, Toda Díaz, had been appointed tutors (nutritores) to the infante Sancho. (Note: The title nutritor regis (king's tutor) was the usually title given to those entrusted with the education of an infante (royal son).) In 1150 Gutierre was still assisting Sancho as the prince took over his own sub-kingdom, which his father had given him around Nájera. A royal charter calls Gutierre the young king's "paranymph" (paraninfus Sancii regis). By 20 July 1153 Gutierre had succeeded Martín Muñoz as Sancho's majordomo. The young king kept a small court, and it was often in attendance at his father's court. Gutierre was replaced by 23 July 1155 with Gómez González de Manzanedo.

Map of the Castilian–Navarrese borderlands in the latter half of the twelfth century, showing the strategic location of Calahorra and Arnedo. Gutierre also served as majordomo of the kingdom (reino) of Nájera in 1153–55.

In 1152, on receiving news that Sancho VI of Navarre was threatening the Rioja, Alfonso VII sent his son Sancho, accompanied by Gutierre and Manrique de Lara, to confront the king of Navarre. The young king arrived at Soria with a large army on 27 May. (Note: His entourage include Archbishop Raymond of Toledo and Bishops Raymond of Palencia, Victor of Burgos, Vincent of Segovia and Rodrigo of Calahorra.) Sancho moved his army to Calahorra by early July, before the threat had dissipated, but since no further conflict is recorded the show of force must have been sufficient to deter the king of Navarre.

Later chroniclers record that Sancho III's favour to Gutierre provoked the war between the Laras and the Castros that plagued the minority of Alfonso VIII. Before his death, Sancho arranged that "the dominions over lands which are held from [the king] as temporal fiefs" (terrarum dominia quae ab eo tenebant feudo temporali) would be frozen for fifteen years, until the three-year-old Alfonso had attained his majority at eighteen.

== Alfonso VIII and the Castro–Lara feud ==
After Sancho's death (31 August 1158) and in accordance with his dying wish, if Rodrigo Jiménez is to be believed, the guardianship of his successor, Alfonso VIII, was entrusted to Gutierre, while the regency of the kingdom passed to Count Manrique Pérez de Lara. According to Rodrigo Jiménez, writing a half-century later, Manrique duped Gutierre into handing Alfonso over to his uncle, García Garcés de Aza, (Note: García was also the uterine brother of Manrique Pérez de Lara.) ostensibly to placate Manrique's supporters in New Castile. The financially strapped García was then coerced into turning Alfonso over to Manrique. Given his years of experience in court politics, it is unlikely that Gutierre would have been so easily duped. He was a "man of advanced age, honoured and worthy of honour" (omne de gran edad et onrrado et de guardar en onrra) and, according to the fourteenth-century Primera Crónica General, the Lara treated him appropriately. In any case, the young king eventually passed into the hands of García Garcés de Aza, and by March 1161 was in the direct care of Manrique. A document from February 1159 already describes García as raising Alfonso VIII under Manrique's authority. From November there is contradictory evidence about Alfonso's guardian. A royal charter witnessed by Gutierre was also witnessed by García before all other witnesses, including Count Manrique, a circumstance only possible if García was the king's guardian. In this document the court met at Burgos, governed by Gutierre, to confirm a donation of Alfonso VII's late sister Sancha Raimúndez. A document from San Salvador de El Moral dated 18 November 1159 refers to Gutierre as "the king's provost" (prepositus regni), but this charter is a later copy and may not be reliable.

There is some evidence that the kingdom of Castile was divided between Manrique and Gutierre after Sancho's death, as part of the agreement which transferred control over Alfonso VIII to García Garcés. A charter of 24 April 1159 states that Gutierre was "the power in Castile" (potestas in Castella), and another of 31 January 1160, a grant to San Salvador de El Moral, describes Manrique as ruling in Toledo and the Trans-Duero while Gutierre ruled in Castile proper (Old Castile). Gutierre did not take part in the war waged by his nephews— Fernando Rodríguez, Pedro Rodríguez, Álvaro Rodríguez and Gutierre Rodríguez—against the Laras. In December 1159 he stood with the Laras to witness a donation by García Garcés to the cathedral of Burgos, and he did not fight in the battle of Lobregal in March 1160, where Fernando Rodríguez defeated Manrique's brother, Nuño Pérez de Lara. After his victory, Fernando fled to the court of King Ferdinand II of León. Gutierre seems to have intervened to bring him back to Castile, for on 11 July uncle and nephew were both at Alfonso VIII's court. He continued to support Manrique, witnessing a royal grant to the Knights Hospitaller in January 1162, and attend the royal court, which visited Manrique's power base in the Trans-Duero in 1161. Later in 1162 he witnessed a donation to the monastery of Santa María de La Vid by Lope Díaz de Haro. This grant is significant because it was transacted at court, and the heads of the two chief rival families to the Laras, the Castros and the Haros, were both present.

On 9 June 1163 Gutierre was back at Alfonso VIII's court to witness a grant of a privilege to Bishop Raymond of Palencia, who had taken part with Gutierre in Sancho III's show of force at Nájera in 1152. After the battle of Huete (1164), in which his nephew, Fernando Rodríguez, defeated the Lara a second time and Count Manrique lost his life, Gutierre accepted the transfer of the regency to Manrique's brother Nuño. He was with the royal court after 6 August, as it made its way to León for negotiations with Ferdinand II, who was still supporting Fernando Rodríguez and the Castros. On 6 September the two royal courts met at Sahagún. They remained until October, Ferdinand II promising not to interfere in Castilian affairs and Nuño agreeing to allow Fernando back into the kingdom. Gutierre was present throughout, probably intervening on behalf of his nephew. The latter was definitively back in favour on 4 February 1165, when he attended court with his uncle. After 19 July 1166, his last appearance at court, Gutierre seems to have retired to his tenancies. His nephew likewise ceased attending the Castilian court after this. The tenancies of Castrojeriz and Amaya, which Gutierre probably held until his death, passed to Nuño de Lara in 1173.

The date of Gutierre's death is not known. He may have died in 1166 or even after May 1169. There is no record of his wife after 1 July 1156, and she may have died before him. They had no surviving children—"and he had a wife named Theoda, from whom he did not receive any offspring" in Rodrigo Jiménez's words—although they may have had a son who died at three years of age. The heirs of his vast tenancies and estates were his nephews. He was buried in San Cristóbal de Ibeas. Rodrigo Jiménez reports that Manrique disinterred Gutierre after taking control of the young Alfonso VIII and threatened to posthumously try him for treason if his nephews did not surrender their tenancies to the crown. This story, repeated in the Chronica latina regum Castellae ("Latin Chronicle of the Kings of Castile") and the Primera Crónica, is impossible, since Manrique died in 1164, before Gutierre.

== Sources ==
- Barton, Simon (1997). The Aristocracy in Twelfth-Century León and Castile. Cambridge: Cambridge University Press.
- Canal Sánchez-Pagín, José María (1997). "El conde García Ordóñez, rival del Cid Campeador: Su familia, sus servicios a Alfonso VI". Anuario de Estudios Medievales. 27 (2): 119–35.
- Canal Sánchez-Pagín, José María (2003). "El conde Gómez González de Candespina: su historia y su familia". Anuario de Estudios Medievales. 33 (1): 37–68. doi:10.3989/aem.2003.v33.i1.197.
- Doubleday, Simon R. (2001). The Lara Family: Crown and Nobility in Medieval Spain. Harvard University Press.
- Frías Balsa, José Vicente (1998). "Gutier Fernández, señor de Soria y su castillo en la primera mitad del siglo XII". Celtiberia. 48 (92): 251–74.
- González, Julio (1960). El Reino de Castilla en la época de Alfonso VIII. Vol. 1. Madrid.
- Lipskey, Glenn E. (1972). The Chronicle of Alfonso the Emperor (PhD dissertation). Northwestern University.
- Martínez Díez, Gonzalo (1975). "Colección Diplomática Burgalesa: Diplomatario de San Cristóbal de Ibeas". Boletín de la Institución Fernán González. No. 185. Burgos: Institución Fernán González. pp. 689–720. hdl:10259.4/1729.
- Martínez Díez, Gonzalo (2007). Alfonso VIII, rey de Castilla y Toledo (1158–1214). Gijón: Ediciones Trea, S.L.
- Reilly, Bernard F. (1998). The Kingdom of León-Castilla under King Alfonso VII, 1126–1157. Philadelphia: University of Pennsylvania Press.
- Martínez Sopena, Pascual (1990). "El conde Rodrigo de León y los suyos: herencia y expectativa del poder entre los siglos X y XII". In Pastor de Togneri, Reyna (ed.). Relaciones de Poder, de Produccion y Parentesco en la Edad Media y Moderna. Madrid: Consejo Superior de Investigaciones Científicas. pp. 5–84.
- Salazar y Acha, Jaime de (1991). "El linaje castellano de Castro en el siglo XII: Consideraciones e hipótesis sobre su origen". Anales de la Real Academia Matritense de Heráldica. 1: 33–68.
- Sánchez de Mora, Antonio (2003). La nobleza castellana en la plena Edad Media: el linaje de Lara (Doctoral thesis). Universidad de Sevilla.
- Serrano, Luciano (1906). Colección diplomática de San Salvador de El Moral. Fuentes para la Historia de Castilla por los padres benedictinos de Silos. Vol. 1. Valladolid: Editorial Cuesta.
- Serrano, Luciano (1935). El obispado de Burgos y Castilla primitiva, desde el siglo V al XIII. Vol. 1. Madrid.
- Torres Sevilla-Quiñones de León, Margarita Cecilia (1999). Linajes nobiliarios de León y Castilla: Siglos IX–XIII. Salamanca: Consejería de educación y cultura de Castilla y León.
- Ubieto Arteta, Agustín (1969). "Notas sobre los "tenentes" de Calahorra en los siglos XI y XII". Príncipe de Viana. 30 (116): 221–32.
