= Arcos de Valdevez tournament =

Tournament between Leon and Portugal

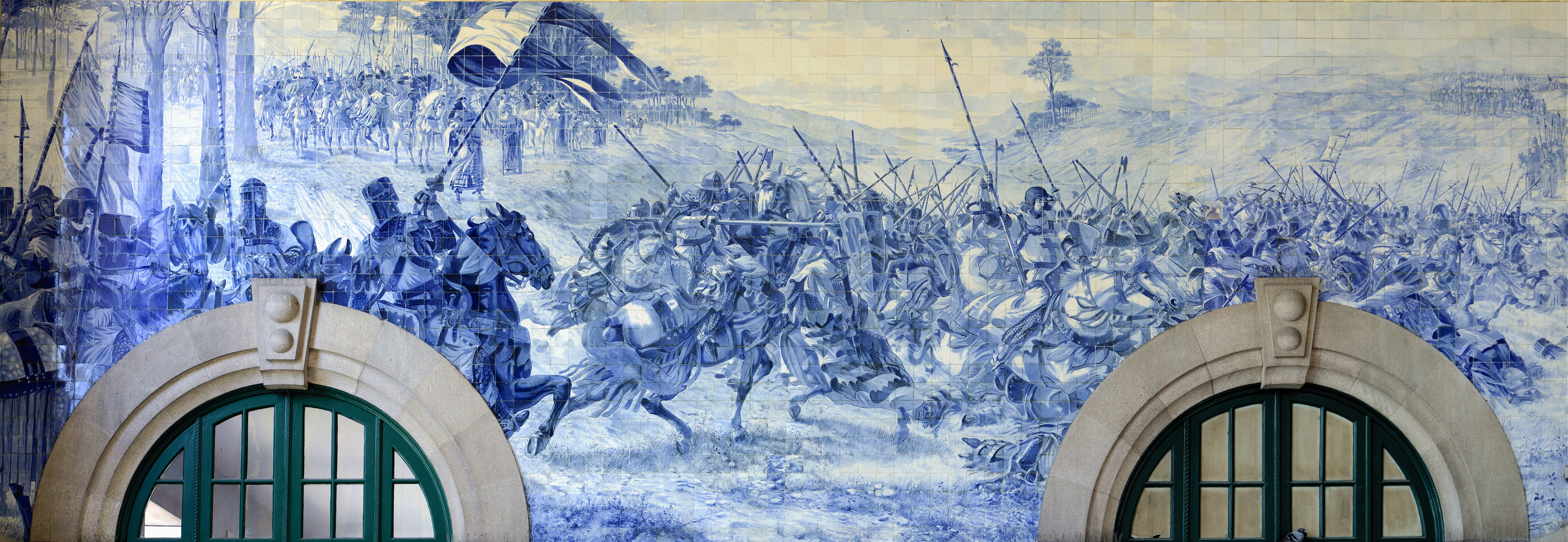
- Azulejo panel depicting the Arcos de Valdevez tournament at the São Bento railway station, Porto
Date	Summer of 1140 or 1141
Location	Arcos de Valdevez, Portugal
Result	Portuguese victory: Treaty of Zamora

Belligerents
Kingdom of Portugal	Kingdom of León

Commanders and leaders
Afonso I of Portugal	Alfonso VII of León

The Arcos de Valdevez tournament (Portuguese: Torneio de Arcos de Valdevez) took place at Arcos de Valdevez on the banks of the river Vez between the Kingdom of León and the then self-proclaimed Kingdom of Portugal in the summer of 1140 or 1141. It is one of only two pitched battles that Alfonso VII of León is known to have fought, and the only of the two not coincident with a siege. His opponent at Arcos de Valdevez was his cousin Afonso I of Portugal. An armistice signed after the battle eventually became the Treaty of Zamora (1143), and ended Portugal's first war of independence. The area of the battle became known as the Veiga or Campo da Matança, the "field of killing".

== Course of the conflict ==
At the start of Alfonso VII's reign, Afonso of Portugal was his heir presumptive. The subsequent birth of two sons to Alfonso VII, the future kings Sancho III and Ferdinand II, and the geographic distance between Afonso's Portuguese power base and the Crown's, probably convinced Afonso to rebel in contravention of the Treaty of Tui (1137) and invade Galicia. He crossed the Minho and entered the area of Valdevez ("valley of the Vez"). Upon hearing this, Alfonso VII rushed troops from León into Galicia, destroying fortifications that could be used by Afonso as they went, and camping in the Serra do Soajo north of the river Lima, of which the Vez is a tributary.

At Arcos de Valdevez, the primary combatants on both sides were mounted knights. It is unclear how the battle developed, but it is believed that in order to eliminate the possibility of a mêlée, each monarch selected knights for individual jousting matches, and the battle descended into a hastilude. The need to deal with an Almoravid invasion of the south of his territory may have forced Afonso of Portugal to accept a tournament. Arcos de Valdevez exemplifies the tendency, noted by Philippe Contamine, of medieval battles between knights to descend "into a sort of great tourney, half serious, half frivolous." At Arcos de Valdevez many prisoners were taken but few lives lost. Besides Ramiro Fróilaz, who is the only nobleman taken at Valdevez mentioned by name in the contemporary Chronica Adefonsi imperatoris, the Portuguese may have captured Ponce Giraldo de Cabrera and the Traba brothers Fernando Pérez and Bermudo Pérez. The Portuguese succeeded in gaining the advantage, by the laws of chivalry of the time, and defeated the Leonese knights. Under these circumstances a peace was concluded and prisoners exchanged. An armistice was signed after the battle that eventually became the Treaty of Zamora.

== Primary sources ==
The Chronica Adefonsi imperatoris relates the episode of Valdevez at §§82–3:

. . . the Emperor [Alfonso VII] commanded the Counts from Castile to prepare for daily attacks on King García [García Ramírez of Navarre]. These nobles were Rodrigo Gómez, Lope López, Gutier Fernández, and others. Alfonso VII mobilized a large force and departed for Portugal. He captured several powerful castles there while destroying and plundering the land. The King of Portugal likewise mobilized his army and marched out to fight the few men who had foolishly been separated from the Emperor's main force. The Portuguese confronted Count Ramiro [Ramiro Fróilaz] who was attempting to conquer their land. They joined in battle, and Ramiro was defeated and taken prisoner.

The Emperor stationed his camp facing the castle at Penha da Rainha which is located in Portela de Vez. The Portuguese King pitched his tents facing the Emperor's camp on a higher and rougher terrain with a valley lying between the two. Many nobles from both armies came down and engaged in individual combat. The Emperor's knights did so without his consent. Many on both sides fell from their horses and were captured.

The older Portuguese nobles witnessed this and said to their king, "Sir, it is not advantageous for us to carry on war with the Emperor. We will not always be capable of resisting his forces which are greater than ours in strength and number. The situation is indeed growing more dangerous. If there had been peace between us, our brothers would not have perished at the hands of the Moors in Leiria. Therefore, you must take precautions so that the Almoravides and the other Moors do not return to attack our cities and castles across the Duero River. If they do, there will be greater destruction than before. Send some of us to the Emperor to request a peace treaty. Let us return all his castles which we now hold, and let him give back the ones which his knights captured in our country. It is much better for us to live in peace than in war."

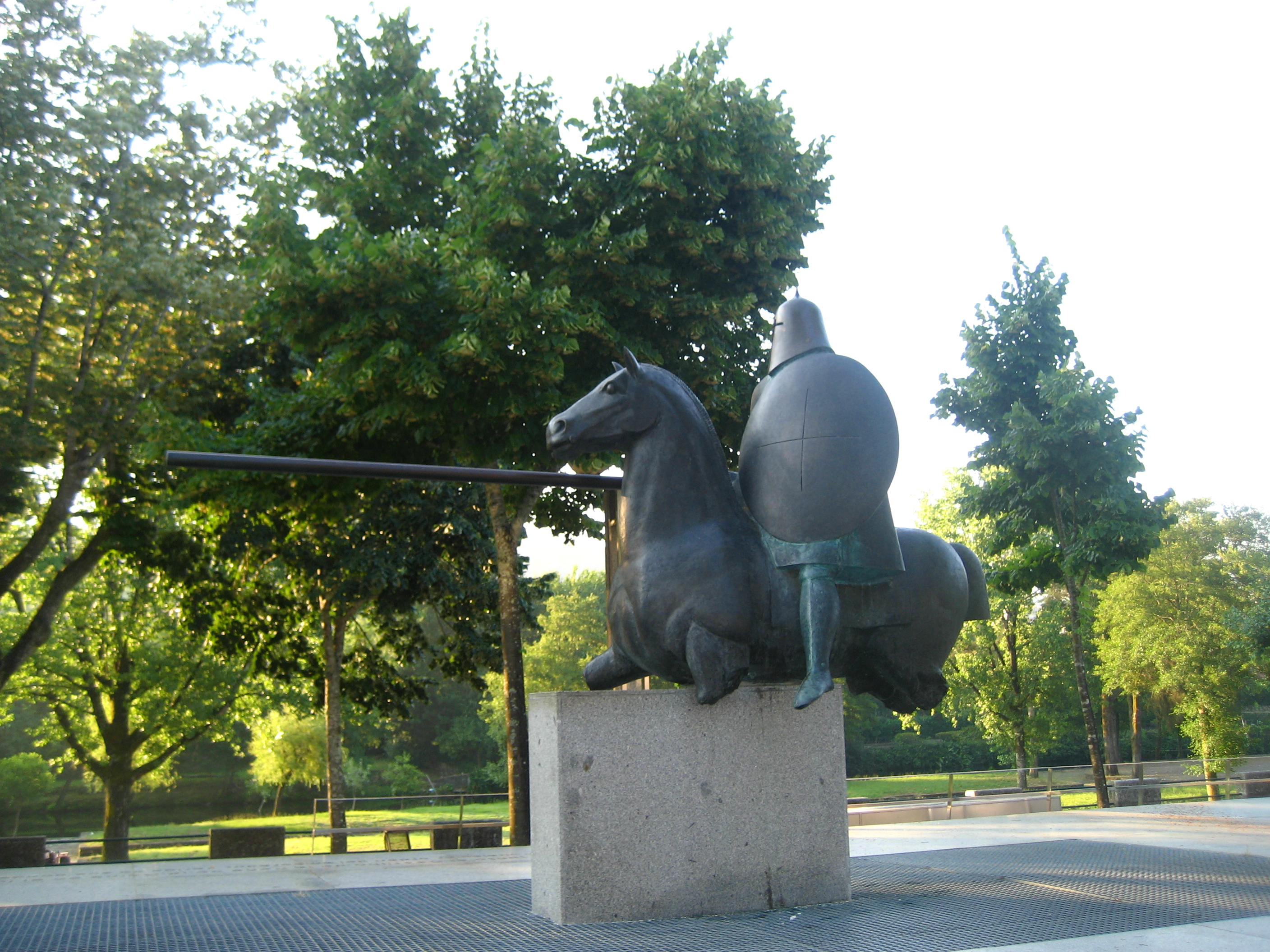
One of the knights in the monument in Arcos de Valdevez

The anonymous Chronicon Lusitanum, a Portuguese source, records the battle under the year 1140:

. . . the Emperor Don Alfonso, son of Count Raymond and Queen Doña Urraca, daughter of the Emperor Don Alfonso, having assembled his entire army of Castile and Galicia, wished to enter the kingdom of Portugal and arrived at a place called Valdevez. But the king of Portugal, Afonso, joined with his army and coming in the manner he wished, drew up his tents, some in that place and others elsewhere. Certain people came from the Emperor for a game [ex parte Imperatoris ad ludendum], which is popularly called a “bufurdio” [Bufurdium], and immediately the men of the king of Portugal came down and fought them. They took many captives, including Fernando Pérez Furtado, the Emperor's brother, the consul Ponce de Cabrera, Vermudo Pérez, and Varella, son of Fernando Yáñez, brother of Pelayo Curvo, and Rodrigo Fernández, father of Fernando Rodríguez, and Martín Cabra, cousin of the consul Don Ponce, and many others who had come with them.

== Memorials ==
There is a commemorative azulejo mural of the battle in São Bento railway station. In Arcos de Valdevez a monument by sculpture José Rodrigues commemorates the battle as a joust. In the Museu de Arcos de Valdevez an artefact from the so-called Torneio de Cavaleiros is permanently on display.

== Sources ==
- Barton, Simon (1997), The Aristocracy in Twelfth-Century León and Castile, Cambridge, England: Cambridge University Press
- Lipskey, Glenn Edward, ed. (1972), The Chronicle of Alfonso the Emperor: A Translation of the "Chronica Adefonsi imperatoris", with Study and Notes, Chicago, Illinois: Northwestern University
- Pereira, Felix John (2009), Abridgement of the History of Portugal, Charleston, South Carolina: BiblioLife LLC, ISBN 978-1-110-33521-3
- Reilly, Bernard F. (1998), The Kingdom of León-Castilla under King Alfonso VII, 1126–1157, Philadelphia, Pennsylvania: University of Pennsylvania Press, ISBN 978-0-8122-3452-7
