= Abd al-Malik Imad al-Dawla =

Ruler of Taifa Zaragoza (1110)

ʿAbd al-Malik ibn Aḥmad ibn Hūd Imād al-Dawla أبو مروان عبد الملك بن أحمد بن هود عماد الدولة

Ruler of Taifa Zaragoza
- Reign: 1110
- Predecessor: Al-Musta'in II
- Successor: -

Ruler of Taifa de Rueda de Jalón
- Reign: 1110-1130
- Predecessor: -
- Successor: Zafadola
- Born: Zaragoza
- Died: 1130; Rueda de Jalon
- Dynasty: Hud
- Religion: Sunni Islam

ʿAbd al-Malik ibn Aḥmad ibn Hūd Imād al-Dawla (Arabic: أبو مروان عبد الملك بن أحمد بن هود عماد الدولة), known by the regnal name Imad al-Dawla (in Arabic: Pillar of the dynasty), Latinised as Mitadolus, was the fifth and last king of the Hudid dynasty to rule the Taifa of Zaragoza, doing so during a very short time in 1110.

Succeeding Al-Musta'in II on his death in the battle of Valtierra in 1110, he could not resist the constant harassment of the Almoravids and the Aragonese, and was forced to ask for help from Castile, becoming de facto one of its vassals. When the Almoravids conquered the Taifa of Zaragoza in 1110, Imad al-Dawla took refuge in the then-impenetrable fortress of Rueda de Jalón, where he created a microstate. With this the taifa of Zaragoza expired.

ʿAbd al-Malik continued to fight against the Almoravids, until the Aragonese king Alfonso the Battler conquered Zaragoza in 1118. He died in 1130 and was succeeded in Rueda de Jalón by his son Zafadola.

Preceded by Al-Musta'in II	King of Zaragoza; 1110	Succeeded by Conquered by the Almoravid Empire
Preceded by New title	Lord of Rueda de Jalón; 1110-1130	Succeeded by Zafadola
