= Raymond II =

Raymond II may refer to:

- Raymond II (bishop of Palencia)
- Raymond II of Rouergue (r. 937–961)
- Raymond II of Pallars (r. 948–995)
- Raymond II of Turenne (r. c. 1143 – 1190)
- Raymond II, Count of Toulouse (r. 918–924)
- Raymond II, Count of Tripoli (r. 1137–1152)
- Raymond II Trencavel (1207 – 1263/1267), viscount
