= Emperor of the Two Religions =

Title used by King Alfonso VI

The Iberian peninsular in 1086 (Alfonso's realm in magenta)

Emperor of the Two Religions (Note: Might also be translated "emperor of both religions".) (Arabic: al-Imbraṭūr dhū-l-Millatayn (Note: Sometimes romanized as al-Inbirāṭūr or al-Imbaraṭūr ḏū-l-Millatayn.)) was a title reportedly used by King Alfonso VI of León and Castile after 1085. While Alfonso used the title Emperor of All Spain from at least 1077, the evidence for his adoption of a specific title referring to Christianity and Islam after 1085 is late and scholars are divided on its reliability.

The title refers to Alfonso's position as paramount ruler in Spain in 1085–86. He directly ruled over the Christian kingdoms of León and Castile, including the ancient Visigothic capital of Toledo, and also extracted tribute (parias) from the petty Muslim rulers of al-Andalus.

== Kitāb al-iktifāʾ ==
The title appears for the first time in an Arabic source after Alfonso's death. The Kitāb al-iktifāʾ of Ibn al-Kardabūs, written in the twelfth century, records that Alfonso "called himself Emperor, which in their language means Amīr al-Muʾminīn [Prince of the Faithful], and in the letters which he issued he wrote 'from the Emperor of the two religions'." The Kitāb also quotes Alfonso pouring contempt on the titles used by the rulers of the ṭāʾifa petty kingdoms of Spain during an audience given to the ambassador of al-Muʿtamid, the ṭāʾifa ruler of Seville. The Kitāb does not, however, quote from any actual letter of Alfonso in which he uses the title "Emperor of the Two Religions".

== Al-Ḥulal al-mawshīya ==
Two actual letters of Alfonso containing variants of the title were copied into the anonymous 14th-century Arabic chronicle Al-Ḥulal al-mawshīya, which was written by a Spanish Muslim. The authenticity of these letters has been a subject of debate.

The first letter was addressed to al-Muʿtamid of Seville after the fall of Toledo on 6 May 1085. In the letter Alfonso demands that al-Muʿtamid hand over his domain to a governor of Alfonso's choosing, Álvar Fáñez. (Note: Ibn Bassām's Adh-Dhakīra provides evidence that Alfonso adopted a policy of replacing the ṭāʾifa rulers with governors (ʿummālihi) against the advice of the Mozarabic count Sisnando Davídiz.) Álvar is known to have rejoined Alfonso's court only in February 1085 after spending time in voluntary exile with Rodrigo Díaz de Vivar (El Cid). The specific form of the title as it appears in this letter is "the emperor, lord of the two faiths, (Note: Or "of the adherents of the two faiths".) the most excellent ruler".

Al-Muʿtamid's letter of reply is also included in the Ḥulal. He rejects Alfonso's demands and also objects to his arrogation of new titles: "with respect to the first point where you have begun to proclaim yourself lord of the two religions, the Muslims are worthier of this title, because your power and religion do not match what they have conquered of the regions of the land or the greatness of their military power". The Ḥulal, which is a strongly pro-Almoravid text, portrays al-Muʿtamid's subsequent request to the Almoravids for assist as a direct response to Alfonso's new demands and titles.

The second letter of Alfonso was addressed to the Almoravid leader Yūsuf ibn Tāshufīn in Morocco. It was after the fall of Toledo but before Yūsuf's victory over Alfonso at the Battle of Sagrajas on 23 October 1086. A version of this letter is also included in the Egyptian stylebook Kitāb Ḥusn al-Tawassul ila Ṣināʿat al-Tarassul of al-Ḥalabī (died 1325). In the Ḥulal version of the letter, Alfonso uses the title "the commander (Note: Or "prince", the title in Arabic being emir.) of the two faiths". In the stylebook's version, the title does not appear, but Alfonso writes, "my authority will be imposed on you and I will be entitled to sovereignty over the two religions and to rule over them".

Al-Ḥalabī identifies the scribe of the letter as a Mozarab named Ibn al-Fakhkhār, probably a Mozarab collaborationist from Toledo. Norman Roth, although arguing that the letter to Yūsuf is a fabrication, suggests that al-Ḥalabī's Mozarabic scribe is in fact based on the historical Jewish family Ibn al-Fakhkhār, which is known to have served Alfonso VIII and possibly Alfonso VI as diplomats.

The authenticity of the letters was accepted by Ramón Menéndez Pidal, Luis García de Valdeavellano and the Egyptian scholar Muḥammad ʿAbd Allāh ʿInān. It was argued for in a series of papers by Angus Mackay and Muḥammad Benaboud. On the other hand, Ambrosio Huici Miranda lumped them with other "fabricated official letters" and has been followed by Bernard Reilly. Roth strongly objects to their authenticity, arguing that fabricated letters between enemies were common in late medieval Islamic historiography. If authentic, the letters must have been originally written in Arabic.

In their analysis of Alfonso's use of imperial titles, Mackay and Benaboud see them as directed primarily at the ṭāʾifa kingdoms and not beyond the peninsula. They write, "[Alfonso] rejected the pretensions of the Taifa rulers while at the same time claiming a title that debarred Muslim claims from outside the peninsula... [He] did not claim a title over all Muslims, wherever they might be, but over Muslims and Christians within Hispania". Strictly, the Arabic term dhū-l-Millatayn, means "the adherents of two religions" and refers more to two communities than to two religions or faiths per se.

== Latin charters ==
No known Latin letter or any other document issued by Alfonso uses a title like "Emperor of the Two Religions". The closest is imperator constitutus super omnes Hispaniae nationes ("emperor established over all the nations of Spain") from a charter of 1087, which links his imperial title to the different peoples under him. Hélène Sirantoine suggests that the Arabic sources are in effect translating this title so as to indicate clearly Alfonso's claim to rule over Muslims, which was unacceptable to them.

A Latin title similar to "Emperor of the Two Religions" is, however, found in the dating clauses of a pair of private charters from Sahagún dated to 1098 and 1104: regnante rex domno Adefonso in Toleto et imperante christianorum quam et paganorum omnia Hispanie regna ("the lord king Alfonso reigning in Toledo and commanding all the kingdoms of Spain both of the Christians and of the pagans").

== Sources ==
- Drews, Wolfram. 2017. "Imperial Rule in Medieval Spain". The Medieval History Journal, 20(2): 288–318.
- Mackay, Angus; Benaboud, Muḥammad. 1978. "The Authenticity of Alfonso VI's Letter to Yūsuf B. Tāšufīn". Al-Andalus, 43: 233–37.
- Mackay, Angus; Benaboud, Muḥammad. 1979. "Alfonso VI of León and Castile, ‘al-Imbraţūr dhū-l-Millatayn’". Bulletin of Hispanic Studies, 56(2): 95–102.
- Mackay, Angus; Benaboud, Muḥammad. 1984. "Yet again Alfonso VI, ‘the Emperor, Lord of [the Adherents of] the Two Faiths, the Most Excellent Ruler’: A Rejoinder to Norman Roth". Bulletin of Hispanic Studies, 61(2): 171–81.
- Menéndez Pidal, Ramón. 1950. "El imperio hispánico y los cinco reinos (conclusión)". Revista de Estudios Políticos, 50: 9–80.
- Menéndez Pidal, Ramón. 2016. The Cid and His Spain. London: Routledge. [Originally published as La España del Cid in 1929.]
- Reilly, Bernard F. 1988. The Kingdom of León-Castilla under King Alfonso VI, 1065–1109. Princeton: Princeton University Press.
- Roth, Norman. 1984. "Again Alfonso VI, ‘Imbarātūr dhu’l-Millatayn’, and Some New Data". Bulletin of Hispanic Studies, 61(2): 165–69.
- Roth, Norman. 1985. "Alfonso VI: An Answer to MacKay and Benaboud's Reply to Roth". Bulletin of Hispanic Studies, 62(2): 179–81.
- Sirantoine, Hélène. 2012. Imperator Hispaniae: les idéologies impériales dans le royaume de León (IX^{e}–XII^{e} siècles). Madrid: Casa de Velázquez.
