= Fernando Pérez de Lara =

Fernando Pérez de Lara (born c. 1115, fl. 1122–50), also called Fernando Furtado or Hurtado, was the illegitimate son of Urraca, queen regnant of León and Castile, and her lover, Count Pedro González de Lara.

He was acknowledged publicly by both parents, and his surname indicates that he was accepted by the Laras as one of their own. A rebellious attempt by his father to place him on the throne in 1130 failed, but he maintained good relations with his half-brother, King Alfonso VII, after that. He was not, however, a regular figure at the royal court, and even stayed for a time in Portugal (1139–40). He was captured fighting for Alfonso VII against the Portuguese in the Battle of Valdevez in 1141. Freed, he returned to Castile, where he had lands.

== Family ==
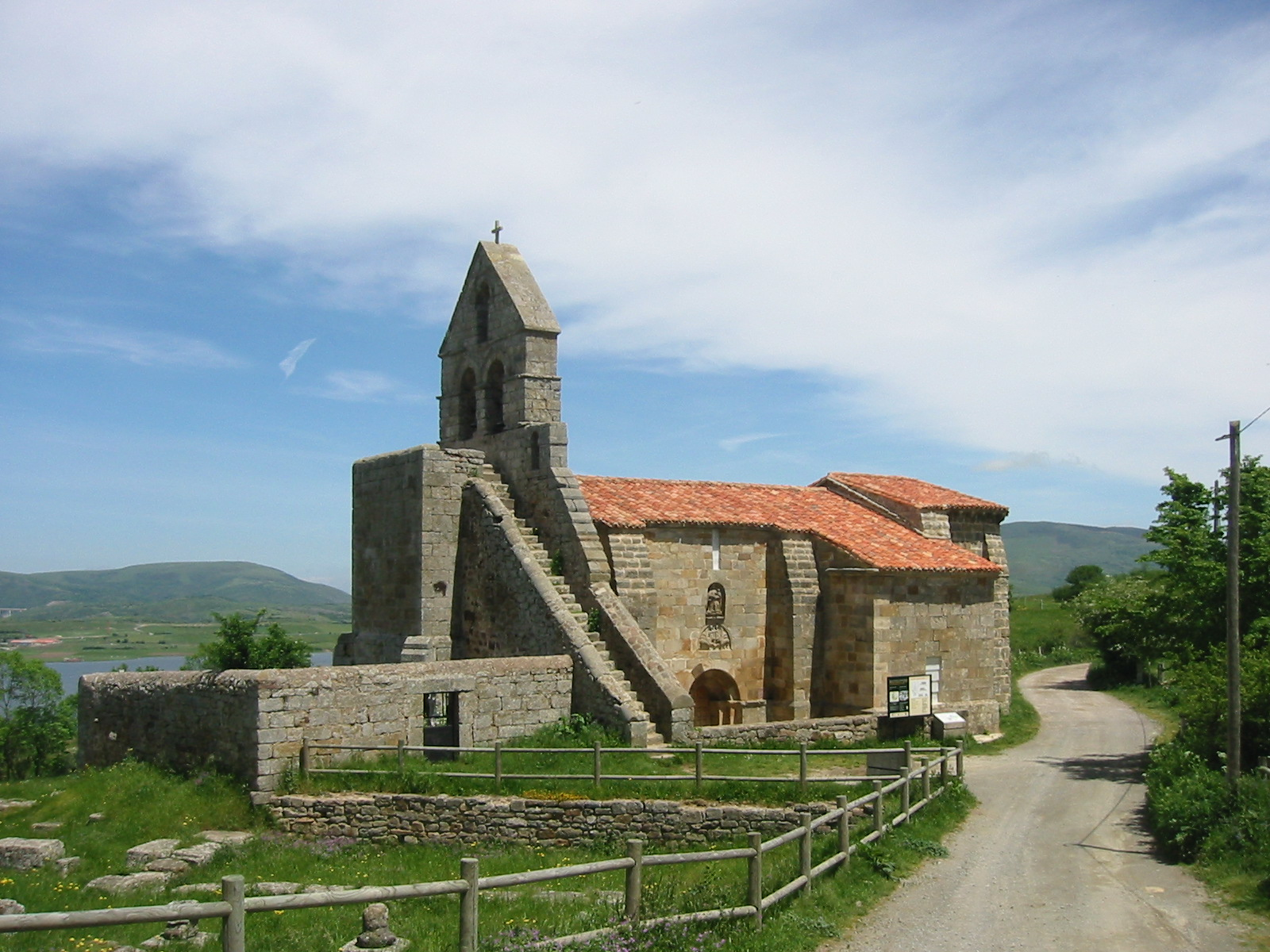
Church of Santa María de Retortillo today

Fernando is first attested in a document of 14 April 1122, which he signed along with his father, his father's new wife and his sisters. This act confirmed the boundaries and rights of the village councils (concejos) of Pinilla, Renedo and Santa María de Retortillo (today in Campoo de Enmedio). With the exception of this occasion in 1122, it seems that Fernando was raised at the queen's court.

Fernando was recognised by the queen as her son in a document of 5 November 1123, by which Urraca made a donation to the Diocese of León. The document was signed by "Fernando Pérez, younger son", an open acknowledgement the Fernando was the queen's son by Pedro, as indicated by the surname Pérez.

Neither Fernando nor his uterine half-brother, the future king Alfonso VII, were married before their mother's death in 1126. Fernando had at least one known full sibling, Elvira Pérez, who was probably older. She married García Pérez de Traba and later Count Beltrán de Risnel. The Historia Compostellana suggests that there were other sons and daughters from Urraca and Pedro's relationships: "[Pedro] slept with [King Alfonso's] mother, and with this queen he had sons and daughters out of wedlock."

== Public life ==
Fernando was born after Urraca's permanent estrangement from her husband, King Alfonso I of Aragon and Navarre, in 1112. His sister Elvira is already mentioned in a document of 1117, suggesting that she was older. He was therefore probably born around 1115. This makes it all but impossible that he is the Fernando Pérez who was governing Baró and Cellorigo in 1120, or Mudá and Cervera de Pisuerga in 1122.

When Queen Urraca died in 1126, Pedro González was regarded as favouring Alfonso of Aragon over Alfonso VII. He probably nursed the hope that his son by Urraca could one day accede to the throne. The Peace of Támara (1127) between Aragon–Navarre and León–Castile and the birth of a son, Ramón, to Alfonso VII (1128) dashed any hope Pedro had of replacing the latter with the king of Aragon's support. This is the situation in which Pedro González and Beltrán de Risnel, Fernando's brother-in-law, launched a revolt in Castile in 1130 with allied uprisings in Asturias and León. The revolt, the goal of which was probably to place Fernando Pérez on the throne, was quickly crushed. Pedro was forced into exile, where he died later that year.

According to Fray Antonio Brandâo, writing in the 16th century, after this Fernando stayed for a time in the Kingdom of Portugal, even fighting on the Portuguese side against the Almoravids at the Battle of Ourique on 25 July 1139. He was certainly in Portugal in July 1140, when he witnessed a donation by King Afonso Henriques to the Cistercian monastery of São João de Tarouca. Nonetheless, according to a Portuguese source, the Chronicon Lusitanum, Fernando was fighting on the Leonese side against Portugal when he was captured in the Battle of Valdevez in the summer of 1141. In September 1141, he was with his half-brother, Alfonso VII, in Santiago de Compostela.

After 1141, Fernando does not seem to have attended Alfonso's court with regularity, for he never witnessed royal charters. In 1150, he was close to his half-brother, Count Manrique Pérez de Lara, witnessing documents with him and attending court. He received the village of Junquera and its serfs from the king, an act witnessed by Manrique.

== Posthumous claims ==
According to Rodrigo Jiménez de Rada, writing in the early 13th century, Fernando was the son of Urraca and Count Gómez González de Candespina, who died in 1111. That Pedro González was his father, however, is proved by a contemporary document which names Count Manrique Pérez de Lara as Fernando's half-brother.

Fernando has often been confused with Fernando Pérez Cautivo, who served as Alfonso VII's majordomo in 1156, and perhaps Sancho III's in 1158.

The Spanish genealogist Luis de Salazar y Castro made Fernando the father of Pedro Fernández de Castro, the founder and first grand master of the Order of Santiago. This relationship is highly unlikely on chronological grounds.

The House of Mendoza fabricated a royal descent for themselves by claiming that Fernando by his wife Guiomar Alonso had a daughter, Leonor Hurtado, who married Diego López de Mendoza.

== Sources ==
- Barton, Simon (1997). The Aristocracy in Twelfth-century León and Castile. Cambridge: Cambridge University Press.
- Canal Sánchez-Pagín, José María (1984). "Don Pedro Fernández, primer maestre de la Orden Militar de Santiago: Su familia, su vida". Anuario de Estudios Medievales. 14: 33–72. ISSN 0066-5061.
- Doubleday, Simon R. (2001). The Lara Family: Crown and Nobility in Medieval Spain. Cambridge, MA: Harvard University Press.
- Reilly, Bernard F. (1982). The Kingdom of León-Castilla under Queen Urraca, 1109–1126. New York: Princeton University Press. ISBN 0691053448.
- Reilly, Bernard F. (1998). The Kingdom of León-Castilla under King Alfonso VII, 1126–1157. Philadelphia: University of Pennsylvania Press. ISBN 9780812234527.
- Sánchez de Mora, Antonio (2003). La nobleza castellana en la plena Edad Media: el linaje de Lara (PhD diss.). Universidad de Sevilla.
