= Valtierra =

Town and municipality in Navarre, Spain

Coordinates: 42°12′N 1°38′W

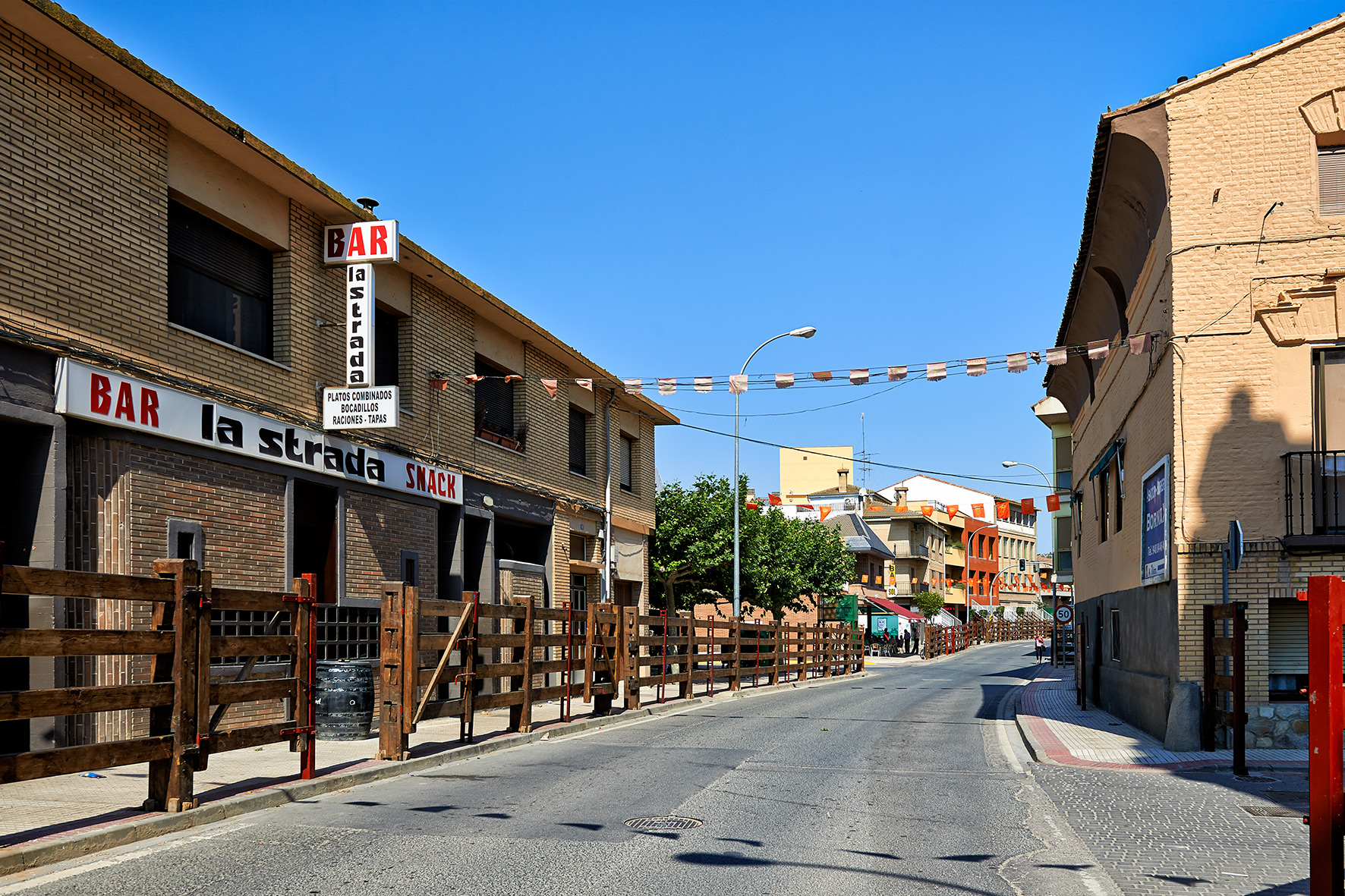

Valtierra (Basque: Balterra) is a town and municipality located in the province and autonomous community of Navarre, northern Spain.

In 918, Ordoño II of Asturias and Sancho I of Pamplona attacked the fortress of Valtierra and burned its mosque and surrounding territory but failed to take the town.

In 1110, the Battle of Valtierra was fought nearby.
