= Battle of Valtierra =

- Part of the Reconquista
Date	24 January 1110
Location	Valtierra, Kingdom of Navarre
Result	Aragonese victory

Belligerents
Aragon–Navarre	Taifa of Zaragoza

Commanders and leaders
Alfonso the Battler (?)	Al-Musta'in II †

The battle of Valtierra was fought between forces from Navarre–Aragon and Zaragoza on 24 January 1110 (1 Rajab 503 AH). The Navarrese defenders were victorious and the king of Zaragoza, al-Musta'in II, was killed.

Late in 1109, al-Musta'in had the citizens of Zaragoza swear an oath of fidelity to him and recognize his son, Imad al-Dawla, as his successor. Early in January 1110, he personally led a raid into Navarre. Passing through Tudela, he attacked a nearby town, seizing its outskirts and forcing its inhabitants to take refuge in a fortified church. The name of the town as recorded in the Arabic sources is uncertain and possibly corrupted. The most likely places are Oñati or Olite. Arnedo is another possible reading, but does not match the description of the town as a square with no defences besides the church.

After a brief siege, the townspeople agreed to pay tribute and give hostages. During his subsequent march homeward, al-Musta'in sent raiding parties into the countryside. Near Valtierra, he was attacked by a force of Navarrese and Aragonese knights. Valtierra was at that time in Zaragozan hands. It would not be captured by Navarre until after the conquest of Zaragoza in 1118. The victorious army did not pursue its foe or attempt to strike further into Zaragoza, probably because it was not equipped for such action.

The main source from the Islamic perspective is Ibn Idhari's Bayan al-Mughrib. An account also appears in Ibn al-Khatib's A'mal al-A'lam. Al-Musta'in was considered a martyr for Islam. The Chronicle of the Peninsular States credits the victory to Alfonso the Battler, king of Aragon and Navarre, which some modern historians have accepted. He is not mentioned by Ibn Idhari. He is mentioned by Ibn al-Khatib. The earliest Christian record does not name him. This is a contemporary reference to the battle is found in the eschatocol of a charter issued by Queen Urraca for the monastery of Montearagón, which was drawn up by an Aragonese scribe on 24 March "in the year in which al-Musta'in died above Valtierra, and the knights of Aragon and Pamplona killed him." Alfonso was probably still in Sahagún, hundreds of miles away, at the time of the battle.

The battle of Valtierra ultimately resulted in the downfall of the kingdom of Zaragoza. Ibn Fatima, the Almoravid governor of Valencia, marched against the city. The accession of Imad al-Dawla was recognized at first, but the Almoravid party was emboldened by his continued payment of parias to Alfonso. An uprising forced him from Zaragoza and Ibn Fatima's successor in Valencia, Muhammad ibn al-Hajj, was invited in. Four months after the battle of Valtierra, Zaragoza was controlled by the Almoravids.

== Works cited ==
- Beech, George (2008). The Brief Eminence and Doomed Fall of Islamic Saragossa. Instituto de Estudios Islámicos y del Oriente Próximo.
- Huici Miranda, Ambrosio (1962). "Los Banu Hud de Zaragoza, Alfonso I el Batallador y los Almorávides (nuevas aportaciones)". Estudios de Edad Media de la Corona de Aragón. 7: 7–38.
- Lomax, Derek W. (1978). The Reconquest of Spain. Longman.
- Stalls, William Clay (1995). Possessing the Land: Aragon's Expansion Into Islam's Ebro Frontier under Alfonso the Battler, 1104–1134. Leiden: Brill.
- Turk, Afif (1978). El reino de Zaragoza en el siglo XI de Cristo (V de la Hégira). Instituto Egipcio Estudios Islámicos.
