= Al-Musta'in II =

Ruler of Taifa Zaragoza (1085–1110)

Abu Ja'far Ahmad Al-Musta'in II أبو جعفر أحمد المستعين الثاني

Ruler of Taifa Zaragoza
- Reign: 1085–1110
- Predecessor: Yusuf al-Mu'taman ibn Hud
- Successor: Abd al-Malik Imad ad-Dawla
- Born: Zaragoza
- Died: 1110; Zaragoza
- Burial: Zaragoza, Spain
- Dynasty: Hud
- Religion: Sunni Islam

Abu Ja'far Ahmad ibn Yusuf ibn Hud (Arabic: أبو جعفر أحمد بن يوسف بن هود), known by the regnal name al-Musta'in Billah (Arabic: المستعين بالله, lit. 'He who looks for help to God'), was the fourth member of the Banu Hud family to rule the Taifa of Zaragoza. He ruled from 1085 to 1110. He was the son of Yusuf al-Mu'taman ibn Hud.

He died in the battle of Valtierra on 24 January 1110.

Preceded by Yusuf al-Mu'taman ibn Hud	King of Zaragoza; 1085-1110	Succeeded by Abd al-Malik Imad ad-Dawla
