= Felipe Maíllo Salgado =

Spanish historian and novelist (born 1944)

Felipe Maíllo Salgado (born 1944 in Monforte de la Sierra, Salamanca) is a Spanish philologist, historian and novelist. He is a professor of Arabic and Islamic Studies at the University of Salamanca, accredited by the Spanish University Council in 2008. He was awarded the María de Maeztu prize for research excellence by the University of Salamanca in 2010.

== Biography ==
He has lived in several countries since his early teens, including France, the United States, various Central American countries, and Singapore. After working as a merchant seaman for many years he returned to Spain around the time of the Spanish transition to democracy. He graduated with a degree in Spanish Philology and Geography and History from the University of Salamanca (1978) and in Semitic Philology from the University of Granada (1979) and earned a doctorate in Spanish Philology from the University of Salamanca in 1981. He later studied the Arabic language and Islamic law at Cairo University between 1983 and 1986.

While teaching both at the University of Salamanca and the National University of Tres de Febrero in Buenos Aires, his research activities are centered in three different fields: the study of language as an essential tool for historical analysis; the translation of historical sources, as well as other texts from Classical Arabic to Spanish; and Islamic law.

He started writing fiction in 1990 and has since published five novels with the publishing house Editorial Cálamo (Cálamo de Sumer) in Buenos Aires.

== Works ==
=== Speciality books ===
- Un análisis del discurso histórico (Lección teórico-metodológica), Salamanca: Comercial Salmantina, 1980

Historical Discourse Analysis (Theoretical Methodological Lesson)

- Los arabismos del castellano en la Baja Edad Media (Consideraciones históricas y filológicas), 3ª ed., Salamanca: Universidad, 1998, [Universidad- Instituto Árabe de Cultura, 1983; Universidad, 1991.]

Arabic Expressions in Castilian Spanish during the Late Middle Ages (Historical and Philological Considerations).

- Vocabulario básico de historia del Islam (Madrid: Ediciones Akal, 1987)

Basic Vocabulary of Islamic History

- Zamora y los zamoranos en las fuentes árabes medievales (Salamanca: Universidad, 1990) [Anejos 2. St. Zamorensia]

Zamora and its People in Medieval Arabic Sources

- Salamanca y los salmantinos en las fuentes árabes (Consideraciones críticas relativas a la dominación árabe, al poblamiento y a la frontera) (Salamanca: Centro de Estudios Salmantinos, 1994)

Salamanca and its People in Arabic Sources (Critical Considerations concerning the Arab Domination, Population and the Frontier)

- Vocabulario de Historia Árabe e Islámica (Madrid: Ediciones Akal, 1996 y 1999).

Vocabulary of Arabic and Islamic History

- ¿Por qué desapareció al-Andalus? (Buenos Aires: Cálamo de Sumer, 1997 y 1998).

Why did Al-Andalus Disappear?

- De la desaparición de al-Andalus (Madrid: Abada Editores, 2004, 2nd edition, 2010)

The Extinction of Al-Andalus

- Diccionario de Derecho Islámico (Gijón: Ediciones Trea, 2005)

Dictionary of Islamic Law

- De Historiografía Árabe (Madrid: Abada Editores, 2008)

About Arab Historiography

- Acerca de la conquista árabe de Hispania. Imprecisiones, equívocos y patrañas (Gijón, Ediciones Trea, 2011; 2nd ed., Madrid, Abada Editores, 2016; 3rd ed., Madrid, Abada Editores, 2018)

On the Arab conquest of Hispania. Imprecisions, mistakes and nonsense

- Diccionario de Historia Árabe e Islámica (Madrid: Abada Editores, 2013)

Dictionary of Arabic and Islamic History

- Las mujeres del Profeta (Madrid: Abada Editores, 2018)

The Wives of the Prophet

- Claves de historiografía arábiga. Fundamentos, diversidad y lenguaje (Salamanca: Nueva Graficesa, 2024)

Keystones of Arabic Historiography. Fundaments, Diversity and Language

- Esposas y concubinas del Profeta. (Córdoba: Almuzara, 2025)

Spouses and concubines of Prophet Muhammad

- Nuevo Diccionario de Derecho Islámico. (Salamanca: Ediciones Universidad de Salamanca, 2025)

New Dictionary of Islamic Law.

- Nuevo Diccionario de Historia Árabe e Islámica. (Madrid: Abada Editores, 2026)

New Dictionary of Arabic and Islamic History.

=== Translation works ===
- Historia de al-Andalus de Ibn al-Kardabus. Estudio, traducción y notas (Madrid: Ediciones Akal, 1986, 2nd ed. rev. 1993, 3rd ed. 2008)
- A través del Oriente (rihla of Ibn Yubayr). Estudio, traducción, notas e índices (Barcelona: Ediciones del Serbal, 1988; 2nd ed. en II vols., Biblioteca El Mundo, MDS BOOKS/ MEDIASAT, Generalitat Valenciana, 2004; 3rd ed. rev. Madrid: Alianza Editorial, 2007)
- Crónica anónima de los reyes de taifas. Estudio, traducción y notas (Madrid: Ediciones Akal, 1991, reprint. 2010)

Anonymous Chronicle of the Petty Kings. Study, Translation and Notes

- La caída del califato de Córdoba y los reyes de taifas (al-Bayan al-Mugrib II de Ibn ‘Idari). Estudio, traducción, notas e índices (Salamanca: Universidad, 1993)

The Fall of the Cordoba Caliphate and the Petty Kings (Al-Bayan al-Mugrib II by Ibn 'Idhari). Study, Translation, Notes and Indexes

- Libro de las categorías de las naciones (Tabaqat al-umam de Sa‘id al-Andalusí). Estudio, traducción, notas e índices (Madrid: Ediciones Akal, 1999)

The Book of the Categories of Nations (Tabaqat al-umam by Said al-Andalusi. Study, Translation, Notes and Indexes)

=== Collective Volumes and Editions ===
- España, al-Andalus, Sefarad: Síntesis y nuevas perspectivas (Salamanca: Universidad, 1988, reprint.1990)

Spain, Al-Andalus, Sefarad: Synthesis and New Perspectives

- Diego de Guadix, Recopilación de algunos nombres arábigos que los árabes pusieron a algunas ciudades y a otras muchas cosas, (Edición en común con E. Bajo Pérez, Gijón, Ediciones Trea, 2005)

Diego of Guadix, Compilation of some Arabic Names that the Arabs put to some cities and many other things

- José Tamayo y Velarde, Memorias del cautirverio y Costumbres, ritos y gobiernos de Berbería según el relato de un jesuíta del siglo XVII, Edición, introducción y notas (Oviedo: Universidad de Oviedo, 2017)

José Tamayo y Velarde, Memoirs of captivity, Costumes, Rites and Governments of Berberia, As related by a 17th Century Jesuit

- Salustiano Moreta Velayos, María de Molina en su historia. Incestuosas nupcias (Edición, Introito y cuadros genealógicos de Felipe Maíllo Salgado, Salamanca: Ediciones Universidad, 2020).

Salustiano Moreta Velayos, María de Molina within her own history. Incestuous marriage (Edition, Introduction and genealogical charts by Felipe Maíllo Salgado

=== Exhibition Catalogues ===
He is the author to the totality or part of the following Catalogues:

- “Los judíos y la ciencia en la península ibérica en el medievo”, Memoria de Sefarad, Toledo, Centro Cultural San Marcos, octubre 2002-enero 2003, Sociedad Estatal para la Acción Cultural Exterior, (colaboración del Ministerio de Asuntos Exteriores, Ministerio de Educación y Ciencia y Ayuntamiento de Toledo) SEACEX, Madrid, 2002

The Jews and Science in the Spanish Peninsula during the Middle Ages

- “El País de la Reina de Saba. Tesoros del Antiguo Yemen”. Centro Cultural Conde Duque, Madrid, 10 de febrero a 6 de abril de 2003; Centro Cultural Bancaixa, Valencia, abril-mayo de 2003; Centro Cultural Rambla, Alicante, agosto-septiembre de 2003; Sala Glorieta Sagunto, Sagunto, agosto-septiembre de 2003, Cuadernos de Arte Conde Duque, Madrid, 2003 (Comisario científico de la Exposición y author del catálogo).

The Country of the Queen of Sheba. Treasures of Ancient Yemen

- “El viaje a Oriente del andalusí Ibn Yubayr”, La aventura española en Oriente [1166-2006] Viajeros, museos y estudiosos en la historia del redescubrimiento de Oriente Próximo Antiguo, edición coordinada por J. Mª. Córdoba y Mª. C. Pérez Díez, Museo Arqueológico Nacional. Madrid, abril-junio de 2006, Ministerio de Cultura, Secretaría General Técnica-Universidad Autónoma de Madrid, Madrid, 2006.

The Journey to the East of the Andalusian Ibn Jubayr

- “Relaciones de los reinos hispánicos del occidente peninsular y el Magreb en la edad media”, ‘Itru l-mahabba. El perfume de la amistad. Correspondencia diplomática árabe en archivos españoles (siglos XIII-XVII), Archivo de la Corona de Aragón, Barcelona, enero de 2009, Ministerio de Cultura, Secretaría General Técnica, 2009.

Relationships of the Peninsular Western Hispanic Kingdoms and the Maghreb during Medieval Times

== Fiction ==
He has said, “When I write, I try to make the story entertaining. My intention is not to shock people, regardless of how risqué is what I am putting across. If it makes you laugh or cry, like it or not, that is up to the reader. Simply, what I try to do is to tell a story that hooks you up, not to bore you”.

=== Trilogía del desarraigo ===
The Trilogy of the Uprooted, is a set of independent novels brought together by the common denominator of the uprootedness.

- Inciertas derrotas, Buenos Aires, Cálamo, 2000.

Uncertain Defeats, or Uncertain Courses, narrates about the long initiation of the main character. It deals really with a double journey: the outer journey with its adventures and the inner journey, of memory and reflection. It is the drifting of a marginal and vitalistic man, obsessed with the passage of time. He talks and thinks in first person, giving a certain intimate tone to the story. It is an adventure narration; a man losing his way with no direction and no God. In a tireless search for someone and its subsequent loss. The best about this novel is the dramatic progression, which enthralls the reader.

- El impasible mutismo de los dioses, Buenos Aires, Cálamo, 2004.

The Impassive Silence of the Gods, is a story of characters battered by life and circumstances, trying desperately to cling to somebody and settle down hoping to belong somewhere (The topic of solitude is a constant in this author). The ethics of the real life adventurer, an almost amoral being are predominant; even so, rude and vulgar words are dignified as they merge with easiness within the narration. It is a harsh novel, with intimate touches, specially when characters nostalgically recall better situations from past times or when, trapped by feelings in an existence with no way out, imagine and chase a final redeeming reward.

- Fabuloso olvido, Buenos Aires, Cálamo, 2006.

Fabled Oblivion, Thanks to an original structure with various intermingled genres, the author gives an account of an investigation about the life of a man who, due to the circumstances protects a defenseless elderly woman. Throughout the novel both lives are intertwined, in a narration filled with reflection and wanderings. This story is ultimately about the big topics of life, and therefore Love, Loneliness, Old age and Death are profusely discussed.

=== Other Novels ===
- Las Mañanas de la Salamandra, Buenos Aires, Cálamo 2010.

In addition to the Trilogy of the Uprooted, The author as published a novel called The Mornings of the Salamander. It is a reflection of the History of Spain by means of a family saga spanning from the end of the 19th century to the first decade of the 21st century (great-grandparents, grandparents, parents, children and grandchildren). It is a collection of the ups and downs of its members, happening both in the mountains and in the city, as well as social and generational changes taking place in the country during the century. The tale is presented in two planes: one set in the present and the other in the past. Past and present unfold thanks to the parade of characters from different generations, fusing with as time passes by. In the meantime the reflections of a hundred-year-old man act as a chorus. The action takes place alternating the city with the hamlet. In certain passages an omniscient narrator whose voice joins with that of the characters, which adds to the variety of the different points of view.

- Suite de Otoño, Buenos Aires, Cálamo 2014.

Autumn Suite is the story of a middle age sailor desperately fighting against the unfolding events of his existence. During this work, the word "nothing" becomes a recurring theme, implying to the reader the futility of making efforts to revert destiny. The author displays throughout the whole work a wide variety of uses of the first person while the main character reflects on life.
