= Ibn al-Kardabūs =

- ابن الكردبوس
- Born: Abū Marwān ʿAbd al-Malik ibn Abī l-Qāsim ibn Muḥammad ibn al-Kardabūs al-Tawzarī; 12th century Tozeur, Tunisia
- Died: 13th century Tunis, Tunisia
- Occupation: Historian

Academic work
- Era: Almohad period
- Notable works: Taʾrīkh al-Andalus (History of Muslim Spain), Kitāb al-iktifāʾ

Abū Marwān ʿAbd al-Malik ibn Abī l-Qāsim ibn Muḥammad ibn al-Kardabūs al-Tawzarī (floruit 12th–13th century) was a Tunisian historian, perhaps of Andalusian origin. He was born in Tozeur and studied the hadith and jurisprudence under Abū Ṭāhir al-Silafī at Alexandria. His best-known work is Taʾrīkh al-Andalus, a history of Muslim Spain. His Kitāb al-iktifāʾ is the earliest source to attribute the title Emperor of the Two Religions to King Alfonso VI of León. He died in Tunis.

== Editions ==
- Maíllo Salgado, Felipe; Ibn al-Kardabūs (2008). Historia de al-Ándalus (3rd ed.). Madrid: Akal.
