= Arconada =

- Municipality and town
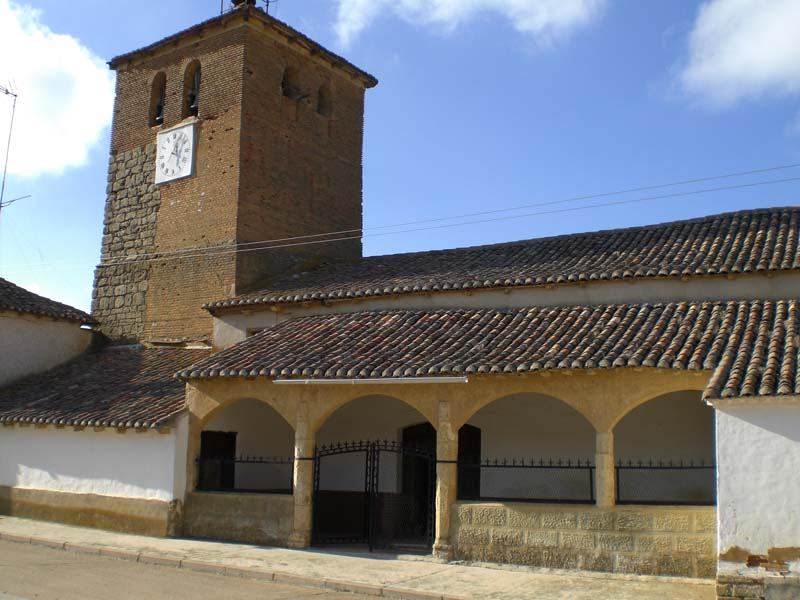

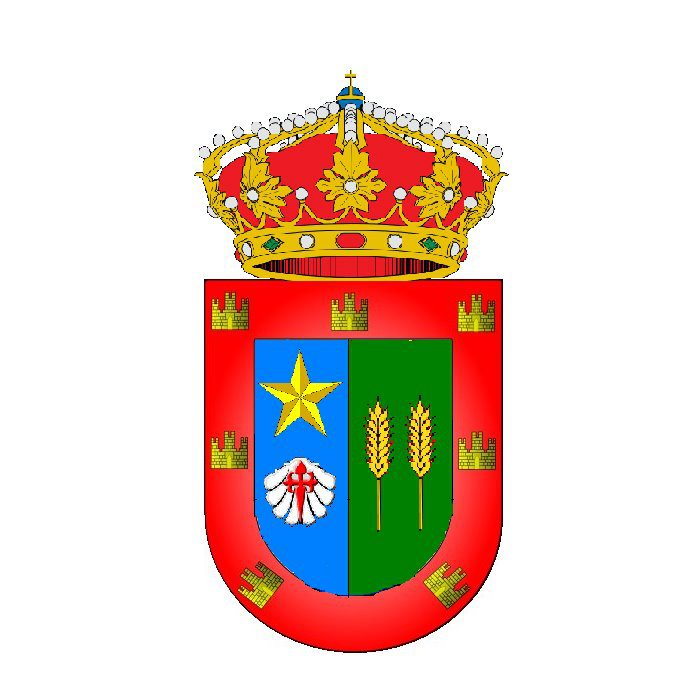
- Coat of arms
- Interactive map of Arconada
- Coordinates: 42°19′N 4°29′W
- Country: Spain
- Autonomous community: Castile and León
- Province: Palencia
- Comarca: El Cerrato

Area
  - Total: 19.4 km^{2} (7.5 sq mi)
- Elevation: 828 m (2,717 ft)

Population (2025-01-01)
  - Total: 45
  - Density: 2.3/km^{2} (6.0/sq mi)
- Time zone: UTC+1 (CET)
  - Summer (DST): UTC+2 (CEST)
- Postal code: 34449
- Website: http://arconada.es

Arconada is a municipality located in the province of Palencia, Castile and León, Spain.
