= Gutierre Fernández (Leonese nobleman) =

Leonese nobleman

Gutierre (or Guter) Fernández (Note: Variations of his name in the Latin sources abound: Guttierre, Gutierri, Guterre, Gutier and Gotier with Fernandi, Fernandiz, Ferrandez and Fredenandiz.) (fl. 1084 – c. 1117) was a Leonese nobleman who served as the majordomo (1110–17) of Queen Urraca until he was removed after imprisoning the queen's lover.

== Early years ==
Gutierre was the son of Fernando Ermíldez, (Note: Also given as Ermeíldez or Hermenegíldez, from the name Hermenegildo/Ermeíldo/Ermildo.) lord of Val de Trigueros, and Juliana. Gutierre's family had lands in the valley of the Pisuerga, and they were closely allied with Count Pedro Ansúrez and his family, contributing to Pedro's foundation of Valladolid, and in 1112 he witnessed two donations of Pedro Ansúrez to the monastery of San Isidoro de Dueñas. Gutierre's date of birth is unknown. His parents name him in an act of 1084, and he was an adult in 1086, when he signed as a witness to a royal charter. He visited the court of Alfonso VI in 1089, where he subscribed to a royal charter. His brother, Ermeíldo Fernández, had a palace in Val de Trigueros in 1095. They had four sisters: Urraca (an abbess), Mayor, María and Munia. All six siblings gathered in 1101 to make a donation to the Abbey of Sahagún.

== Majordomo ==
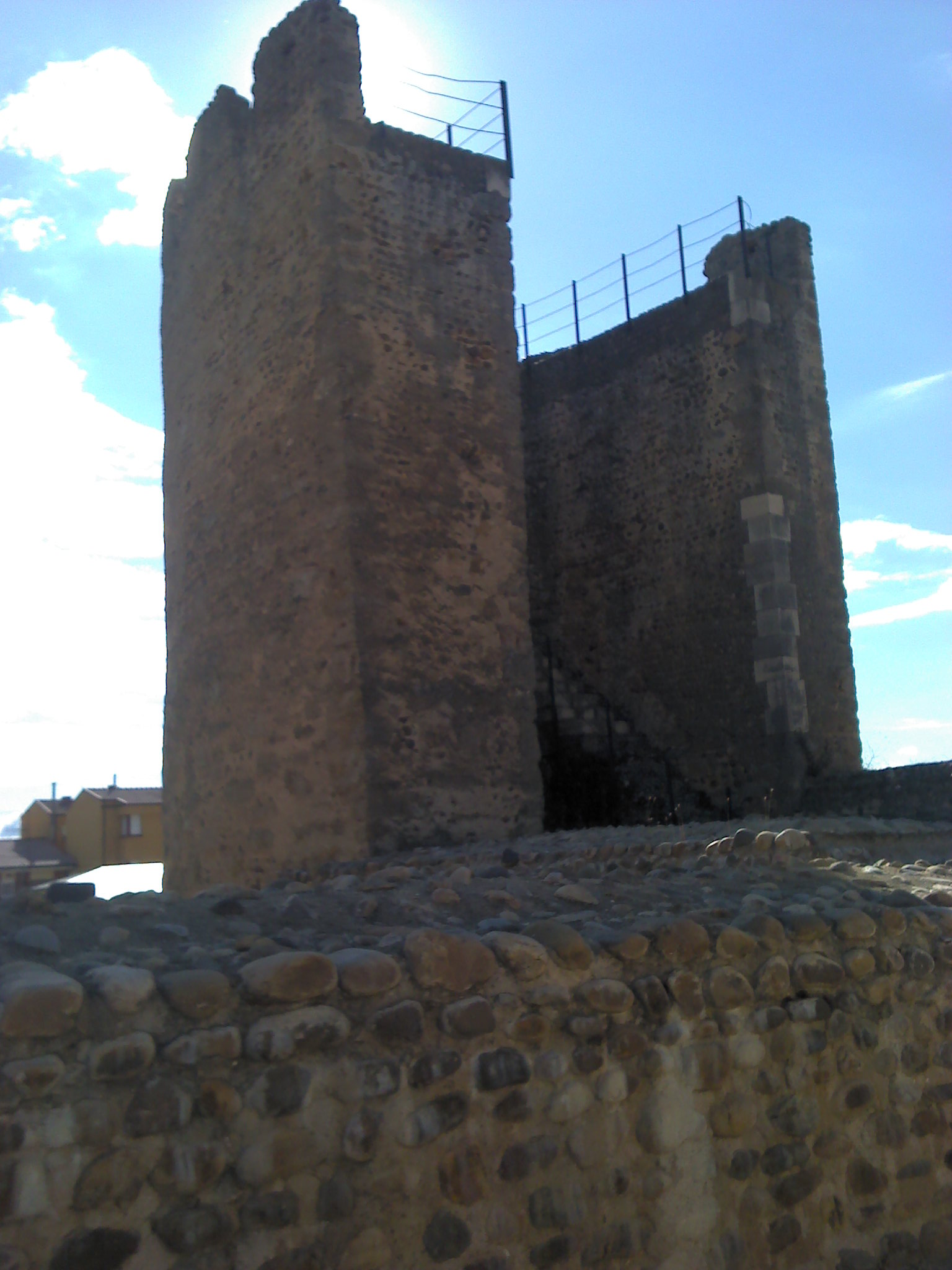
Ruins of the 12th-century walls of Mansilla

Gutierre is first mentioned as "court administrator" (villicus curie) in a document of 15 October 1110. In subsequent documents of that year he is called villicus palacii (26 December) and pallicu vilicus (30 December), both meaning "palace administrator". The first charter in which he bears the title majordomo (maiordomus palacii) dates to 18 January 1111. Throughout 1111 he is usually titled this way: "majordomo in the [royal] court". In a royal charter of 19 September 1111 he uses the unusual sobriquet Miennaia before his name. This name, popularised by the Cantar de Mio Cid for Álvar Fáñez Minaya, is a mix of Romance and Basque parts meaning "my brother". It might have been chosen as an exoticism to demonstrate the culture and prestige of the queen's court. One royal charter of 13 March 1115 refers to Gutierre as simply the steward (dapifer).

Between 1112 and 1114 three surviving documents all explicitly describe Gutierre as majordomo "of the queen" or "in the queen's court". As the queen's majordomo, Gutierre was usually at court and is often found in the centre of the kingdom, as on 15 October 1116, when he witnessed a donation to the important monastery of Sahagún. He then travelled to the eastern border of the kingdom, to witness a donation to Santa María de Nájera on 22 January 1117. There is no further record of him in contemporary documents after this, and he was replaced as majordomo by Jimeno López. The reason for his downfall is described in the Historia Compostellana ("History of [the Diocese of] Compostela"):

At that time Gutierre Fernández captured Count Pedro González, and held him prisoner in the castle Mansilla. This Count Pedro, it was said, was bound by the strongest chain of love to Queen Urraca, from whom he held Castile and no small part of Campaña. Because of this, his capture produced sorrow and sadness in the queen.

Pedro González de Lara was reputed to be the queen's lover, and his influence on her aroused opposition to their relationship among the high nobility. The period of his imprisonment at Mansilla de las Mulas was short, but there is disagreement as to the year. In context, the Historia places it in 1119, but if the reference to "that time" (eodem tempore) is read more loosely, then the events fit much better in 1117, when Gutierre disappears from the record for a time. If it occurred in 1119, it must have been between 26 March and 30 June, the only period when Pedro is absent from the queen's charters. Gutierre's final recorded act was to witness another donation by Pedro Ansúrez to San Isidoro de Dueñas on 4 July 1117, which was probably after Pedro González's release. The proximity of Mansilla to León (it is twenty miles to the south) and the close relationship between Gutierre and the powerful Ansúrez family both before and after indicate that the ephemeral coup had substantial support in the kingdom. The historian Bernard Reilly, believe the episode to have taken place in 1119, associates the fighting in León (recorded in the Annales Complutenses) on 18 July that year, when the queen was briefly besieged in her palace, with its final defeat.

== Confusion ==
There is confusion in later sources between Gutierre Fernández, majordomo of Urraca, and Gutierre Fernández de Castro, later majordomo of Alfonso VII. In the thirteenth century, Lucas of Tuy says that shortly after 1100, King Alfonso I of Aragon and Navarre attacked the church of San Isidoro de León in order to take its precious stones and gold and silver treasures, but the church was successfully defended by Gutierre Fernández, the "heir of Castile". Although Lucas believed this person to be Gutierre de Castro, it is chronologically impossible, since the latter would have been only a young child at most. Similarly, Rodrigo Jiménez de Rada and the Primera Crónica General both associate the Castro magnate and Gómez de Manzanedo (born around 1120) with the imprisonment of Pedro de Lara. The Primera Crónica General even associates Gutierre with proclaiming Alfonso VII king in opposition to his mother, Urraca, although that was done by Count Pedro Fróilaz de Traba. These texts fooled some later historians, like Esteban de Garibay y Zamalloa and Prudencio de Sandoval.

== Sources ==
- Canal Sánchez-Pagín, José María (2003). "El conde Gómez González de Candespina: su historia y su familia". Anuario de Estudios Medievales. 33 (1): 37–68. doi:10.3989/aem.2003.v33.i1.197. Archived from the original on 2017-12-11.
- Peterson, David (2008). "Sobre el nombre medieval Annaia" (PDF). Fontes linguae vasconum: Studia et documenta. 40 (107): 119–50.
- Reilly, Bernard F. (1981). The Kingdom of León-Castilla under Queen Urraca, 1109–1126. Princeton, NJ: Princeton University Press.
- Salazar y Acha, Jaime de (1991). "El linaje castellano de Castro en el siglo XII: Consideraciones e hipótesis sobre su origen". Anales de la Real Academia Matritense de Heráldica. 1: 33–68.
- Sánchez de Mora, Antonio (2003). La nobleza castellana en la plena Edad Media: el linaje de Lara (Doctoral thesis). Universidad de Sevilla.
- Torres Sevilla-Quiñones de León, Margarita Cecilia (1999). Linajes nobiliarios de León y Castilla: Siglos IX–XIII. Salamanca: Consejería de educación y cultura de Castilla y León.
