= Raymond II (bishop of Palencia) =

Catalan churchman

Raymond II (died 1183), called Raimundo de Minerva, was a Catalan churchman and the bishop of Palencia in the kingdom of Castile from 1148.

King Sancho III of Castile refers to him as his avunculus (uncle), implying that he was a brother of the Empress Berengaria, a fellow Catalan. On the other hand, his surname "de Minerva" probably indicates that he came from a noble family of the Minervois, perhaps the same family as Count Ponce de Minerva. Prior to his elevation to the episcopacy, he was a monk at the Abbey of Cluny under Abbot Peter the Venerable. His appointment in 1148 to the see of Palencia was probably made on the urging of Berengaria. The empress was visiting Palenca in 1149 when she died.

Following the death of Alfonso VII in 1157, his empire was split between his sons: Sancho III taking Castile and Ferdinand II taking León. This division caused the region around Palencia, the Tierra de Campos, in western Castile to become a disputed zone. Into this context, Pope Alexander III sent a letter Raymond castigating him for "seeking the company of knights more than was appropriate for a man in such a high post". Raymond was loyal to Sancho III and, after the latter's death in 1158, to his young son, King Alfonso VIII. In 1177 he went on a mission to England to retrieve Alfonso VIII's bride, Eleanor.

Raymond was the last of a series of Catalan bishops going back over a century to the restoration of the diocese of Palencia in 1035, and he continued to favour Catalans for positions. A single document of 1162 shows several clerics with Catalan names: the deacon Bernard Simon, the archdeacons Raymond Arnaldi and Bernard Pessun, Abbot Berengar of Hermidas, the episcopal chaplain Garnerius and the diocesan chancellor Martin Ermengaudi. Raymond did not call any diocesan synods, nor did he travel widely in his diocese or show a great interest in restoring churches, but he developed the system of council and archdeaconries through which the diocese was administered. He also favoured economic development and the settlement of underpopulated areas. The first university-educated masters (magistri) also arrived in Palencia during his term. The cathedral school developed under Raymond—which educated men like Domingo de Caleruega, Pedro González Telmo and perhaps Gonzalo de Berceo—became the basis of the University of Palencia after Raymond's death.

== Sources ==
- Fernández, Luis (1962). "La abadía de Santa María de Benevívere en la Edad Media: su historia, la regla". Miscelánea Comillas: Revista de Ciencias Humanas y Sociales. 20 (37): 5–254.
- Lomax, Derek W. (1985). "Catalanes en el imperio leonés" (PDF). Toletum: Boletín de la Real Academia de Bellas Artes y Ciencias Históricas de Toledo. 17: 201–13.
- Lomax, Derek W. (1965). "Don Ramón, Bishop of Palencia, 1148–1184". Homenaje a Jaime Vicens Vives. Vol. I. Barcelona. pp. 275–91.
