= Pedro López de Monforte =

Iberian nobleman

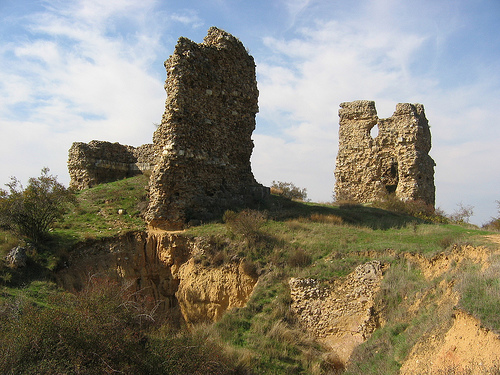
Ruins of the castle of Saldaña, an important tenencia held by Pedro.

Pedro López de Monforte (Latin: Petrus Lupi; floruit 1103–35) was an Iberian nobleman and castellan, probably originally from the Rioja. He was most active in the Kingdom of León, where he was appointed a count, the highest rank in the kingdom, by Alfonso VII sometime before 1 July 1131.

The identity of his family is unclear. His brothers were Jimeno and Lope López, both majordomos under Queen Urraca. He may have been a son of Lope Íñiguez and thus kinsmen of the house of Haro that held the Lordship of Biscay. The family of Pedro's wife, Sancha Gómez, is also unclear. She is known by name only from a charter of their daughter Countess Urraca, in which the latter granted some lands she had inherited from both parents to the Diocese of Burgos in 1173. A certain "countess Sancha" (Santia comitissa) made a donation to the monastery of San Salvador de Oña on 19 December 1135 along with her sister Estefanía and brother Rodrigo Gómez. This may be the widow of Pedro López.

Pedro was a courtier during the latter half of the reign of Queen Urraca. He witnessed nineteen royal diplomas between 1114 and 1125. On the death of Pedro Ansúrez in 1117 Pedro López received the strategically important tenencia (lit. "holding") of Saldaña, which he ruled until 1126. He may also have received Pedro Ansúrez's other holdings on the Río Carrión. The influence of Pedro and his brothers at court and their likely background in the Rioja has led some scholars to conclude that they were either exiled by Alfonso I of Aragon and Navarre or had first come to León with Alfonso in the early 1110s.

In 1119 Pedro was handed the government of Monforte, which he continued to rule until 1132. After the accession of Alfonso VII, Pedro joined his brother and the rest of the Leonese nobility in greeting the king and paying him homage in the capital city of León, after the king had taken it from the rebellious supporters of the Lara brothers Pedro and Rodrigo González. Between 1129 and 1133 Pedro sporadically held other tenencias from the crown, such as: Ferrino, Mayorga, Río Seco, Salamanca, and Gatón. Pedro was atop the list of confirmants in at least three royal charters in these years, indicating his high status at the court of Alfonso VII. In 1130, before 14 March, Pedro was given the fief of Toro and held it consistently down to at least his final appearance in the records, and probably until his death in or after September 1135.

Sometime while he was "ruling Salamanca" (mandante Salamancha), although the duration of this rule cannot be precisely dated, Pedro attempted but failed to install his own candidate in the vacant Diocese of Salamanca. In 1133 the bishop, Nuño, disappears from the records, probably deceased. A synod held at León in 1134 appointed Berengar of Toledo to succeed him, although Berengar did not take the title bishop-elect until the summer of 1135 and he was not consecrated by his archbishop, Diego Gelmírez, until March 1136. The name of Pedro López's candidate was also Pedro, and was said to enjoy the support of the "clergy and people of Salamanca" (clerici Salmanticenses et populus). The Archbishop of Toledo, Raymond de Sauvetât, accused him of being "altogether unsuitable" (absolute simplex) and having granted church benefices to his supporters. Raymond suggested that Diego Gelmírez at first supported the uncanonical bishop, who was only removed after lengthy negotiations. It has been speculated that the fall of the bishop Pedro, the disappearance of Pedro López from the records, and his brother Lope's loss of the office of majordomo all in 1135 may have all resulted from a military failure on the part of the count, and his consequent loss of the support of the king. The military defeats of the Salamancan militia in 1132–34 are recorded in the Chronica Adefonsi imperatoris, but without mentioning Pedro López.

== Works cited ==
- S. Barton. 1997. The Aristocracy in Twelfth-century León and Castile. Cambridge: Cambridge University Press.
- R. A. Fletcher. 1984. Saint James's Catapult: The Life and Times of Diego Gelmírez of Santiago de Compostela. Oxford: Oxford University Press.
- G. E. Lipskey. 1972. The Chronicle of Alfonso the Emperor: A Translation of the Chronica Adefonsi imperatoris. PhD thesis, Northwestern University.
- B. F. Reilly. 1982. The Kingdom of León-Castilla under Queen Urraca, 1109–1126. Princeton: Princeton University Press.
