= Rueda de Jalón =

Rueda de Jalón, Spain
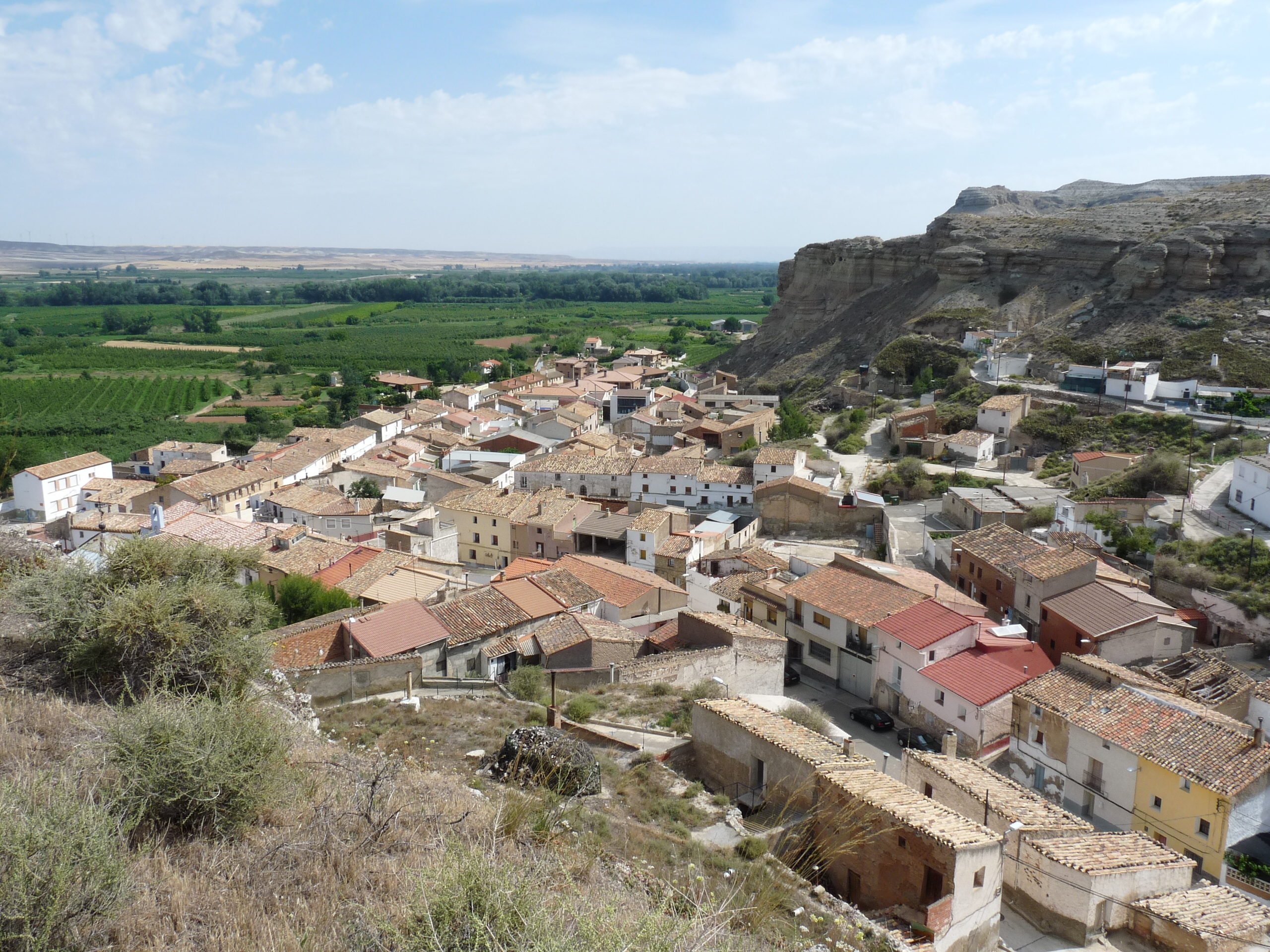

- Flag Coat of arms
- Interactive map of Rueda de Jalón, Spain
- Coordinates: 41°38′N 1°17′W
- Country: Spain
- Autonomous community: Aragon
- Province: Zaragoza
- Municipality: Rueda de Jalón

Area
  - Total: 107 km^{2} (41 sq mi)

Population (2025-01-01)
  - Total: 325
  - Density: 3.04/km^{2} (7.87/sq mi)
- Time zone: UTC+1 (CET)
  - Summer (DST): UTC+2 (CEST)

Rueda de Jalón is a municipality located in the province of Zaragoza, Aragon, Spain. According to the 2004 census (INE), the municipality has a population of 360 inhabitants.

== See also ==
- List of municipalities in Zaragoza
