= Iberian Crusades =

Crusades against Muslim control of Iberia

The Iberian Crusades were papally promoted wars, part of the Reconquista, fought against the Muslim states of the Iberian Peninsula within the wider Crusading movement from 1095 to 1492. The Muslim conquest of the peninsula was completed in the early 8th century, yet the small realm of Asturias endured in the north-west. From the 9th century, local chronicled portrayed its southward expansion against al-Andalus (Muslim Spain) as a divinely sanctioned war of recovery. This expansion, along with Frankish advance, gave rise to new Christian realms—Navarre, León, Aragon, Castile, Portugal, and Barcelona—in the north. After al-Andalus split into taifas (small states) in 1031, the Christian realms exploited Muslim disunity to further expansion. From the 1060s, the papacy occasionally granted spiritual rewards to those participating in campaigns against al-Andalus.

As the Reconquista advanced, the taifa rulers sought aid from the Almoravids of North Africa, who halted the Christian expansion. Soon after proclaiming the First Crusade for the liberation of the Holy Land at the Council of Clermont in 1095, Pope Urban II extended the same spiritual privilege—remission of sins—to Iberian lords who took up arms against the Moors (Iberian Muslims). Peter I of Aragon was the first ruler, in 1100, to fulfil his crusading vow within the peninsula, and his example was soon followed by others. Leading crusading armies, Alfonso I of Aragon captured Zaragoza (1118), Afonso I of Portugal seized Lisbon (1147), and Ramon Berenguer IV of Barcelona took Tortosa (1148). The renewed Christian advance provoked another North African intervention, this time by the Almohads, who temporarily halted the Christian expansion. Occasionally, the Moors' Christian allies, such as Alfonso IX of León were also targeted by crusading campaigns. After crusader forces inflicted a decisive defeat on the Almohads at the Battle of Las Navas de Tolosa in 1212, the Reconquista gained new momentum. Papal grants of crusade indulgence then supported James I of Aragon in the conquest of Mallorca (1231) and Valencia (1238), and Ferdinand III of Castile in the capture of Córdoba (1236) and Seville (1248), reducing al-Andalus to the Emirate of Granada by 1262.

== Terminology ==
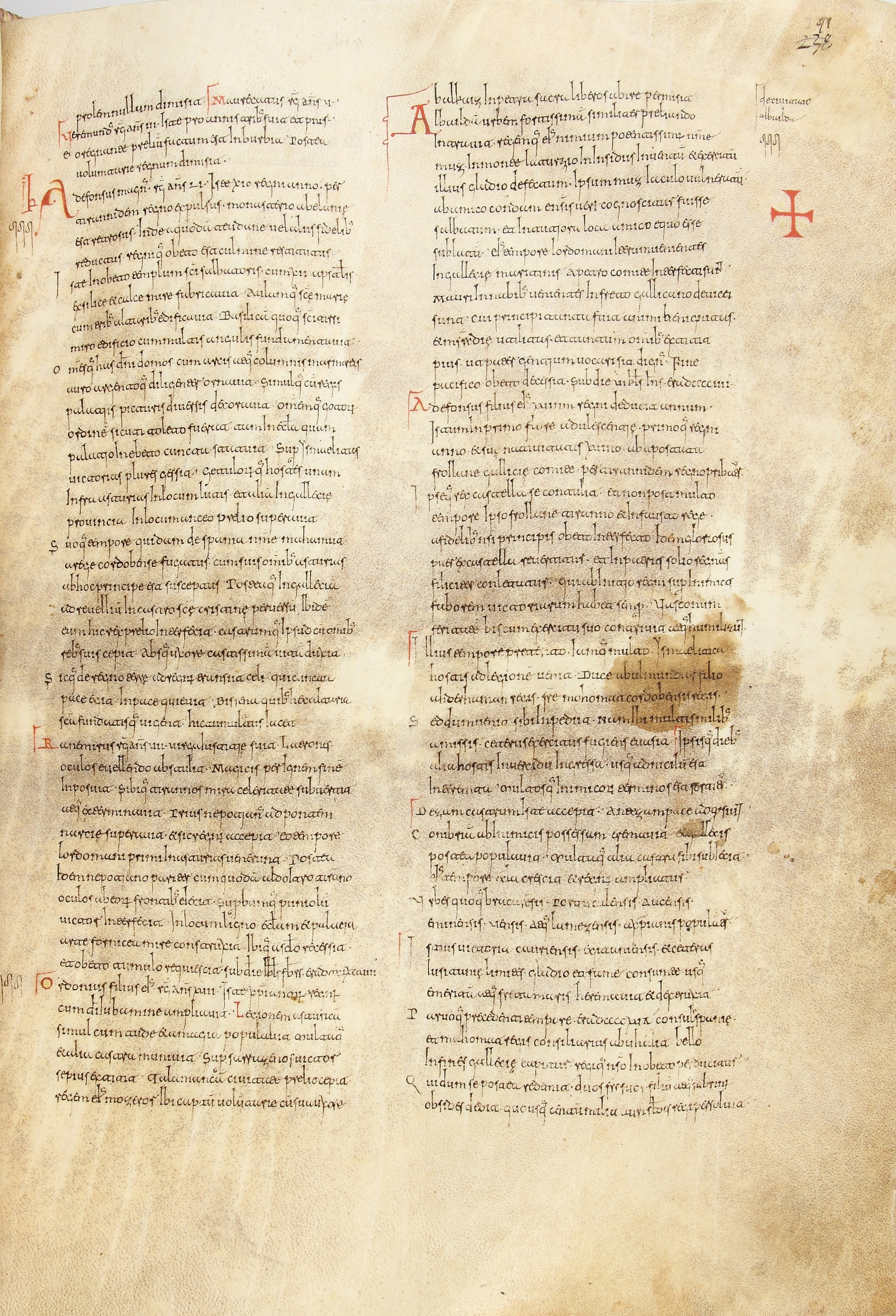
A page from a 10th-century manuscript of the Chronicle of Albelda, an early text articulating the ideology of the Reconquista

As the historian Andrew Jotischky notes, before the close of the 11th century the Iberian Peninsula was "the only part of Latin Christendom to have undergone lasting conquest by the Islamic world". The idea of recovering lost Christian lands first appeared in 9th-century chronicles, like the Chronicle of Albelda, by clerics of the Kingdom of Asturias, a Christian enclave in north-western Iberia. (Note: The following passage of the Chronicle of Albelda is an early expression of this ideology: "They [the Muslims] take the kingdom of the Goths, which until today they stubbornly possess in part; and against them the Christians do battle day and night, and constantly strive; until the divine fore-shadowing orders them to be cruelly expelled from here. Amen.") As Christianity condemned aggressive warfare, the notion of waging war to reclaim Christian territory provided a moral rationale for campaigns against Muslims. The gradual recovery of regions once under Christian rule became known as the Reconquista ('Reconquest'). Extending until 1492, it was, in the words of the medievalist Nikolas Jaspert, "not an ongoing war, but a succession of long periods of peace punctuated by shorter crises".

The historian Christopher Tyerman observes that "the Reconquest and crusading were not synonyms". Scholars defining crusades narrowly—as papally directed efforts to recover the Holy Land—exclude the papally endorsed wars of the Reconquista. Paul Rousset concedes their crusading aspects—papal backing, international participation, and anti-Muslim intent—while Hans Eberhard Mayer calls them "a substitute for a crusade". Historians identifying crusades through the granting of a specific spiritual privilege, the crusade indulgence, include papally sponsored Iberian wars within the broader crusading movement.

Early Christian sources, composed in Latin in the 9th century, drew on the Book of Genesis to describe Muslim foes, using Saraceni and Ismaelitae; the more neutral Mauri ("Mauritanians") became dominant from the 11th century, later evolving into moros in Spanish and "Moors" in English. Christians under Muslim rule are known as Mozarabs (from Arabic al-musta'rab, "Arabised"), while Muslims remaining in Christian-held lands are termed Mudejars (from al-mudajjan, "domesticated").

== Background ==
The Christianisation of the Iberian Peninsula began under Roman rule. The congregations of León and Mérida were the first representatives of organised church life in 254, while the Council of Elvira had already gathered 19 bishops and 24 priests in the early 4th century. After successive migrations, the Visigoths gained control of most of Iberia by c. 472. Originally Homoian Christians, deemed heretical by Nicene (Catholic) Christians, they converted to Catholicism under King Reccared I, adopting the faith of most Hispano-Romans. By the late 6th century, the archbishops of Toledo consecrated bishops across the Visigothic kingdom, establishing the Toledan liturgy as standard. In 711, Muslim forces from North Africa defeated the Visigoths at Guadalete, and conquered most of the peninsula within a decade.

Caliphate of Córdoba and the northern Christian states c. 1000

Al-Andalus (Muslim Spain) was initially ruled by governors of the Umayyad caliphs. After the Abbasid overthrow in 750, the Umayyad prince Abd al-Rahman escaped to al-Andalus and made Córdoba his capital. From 929, its rulers adopted the title of caliph, asserting independence from the Abbasids. Christians became second-class citizens, or dhimmis ('protected people'), paying the jizya tax. Restrictions on them sparked an anti-Muslim movement in the 840s. The "Martyrs of Córdoba" sought execution by publicly denouncing the Islamic prophet Muhammad; the ensuing persecution drove migration north, though rural al-Andalus remained largely Christian for centuries. (Note: Although the Mozarabs remain an obscure and poorly documented group, they may have made up as much as c. 30% of the population of al-Andalus as late as the 11th century, according to scholarly estimates, despite frequent conversions to Islam, continued northward migration, and the occasional deliberate resettlement of Mozarabs from temporarily conquered cities into the Christian kingdoms.)

In the unconquered north, Asturias emerged after the Visigothic noble Pelayo defeated Muslim troops at Covadonga. Exploiting divisions in al-Andalus, Asturian kings advanced south to the River Duero. When the capital moved from Oviedo to León in the 910s, Asturias evolved into the Kingdom of León. In the northwest, the shrine of the apostle James the Great at Santiago de Compostela became a major pilgrimage centre.

In 778, Charlemagne, king of the Franks, invaded al-Andalus. Later Frankish campaigns established Catalan counties along the Pyrenees, while Basque resistance produced the Kingdom of Navarre in the 820s. The Christian realms often divided and reconfigured, giving rise to new polities such as Castile and Aragon. In 1031, the Caliphate of Córdoba fragmented into taifas (small states), (Note: Although the Hammudid rulers of Algeciras claimed the title of caliph, their taifa was annexed by Seville in 1065. Other taifa rulers adopted titles such as malik, sahib, or hajib, reflecting their nominally subordinate status despite their actual independence. From around 1043, several of them recognised a puppet caliph installed by the ruler of Seville, who proclaimed him to be the former Umayyad caliph Hisham II.) many paying parias (tribute) to Christian rulers. (Note: A prominent example is the 1073 treaty between Sancho IV of Navarre and al-Muqtadir of Zaragoza, which stipulated that the taifa ruler would pay Sancho 12,000 gold pieces in return for Sancho's support against his enemies.)

== On the eve of the Crusades ==
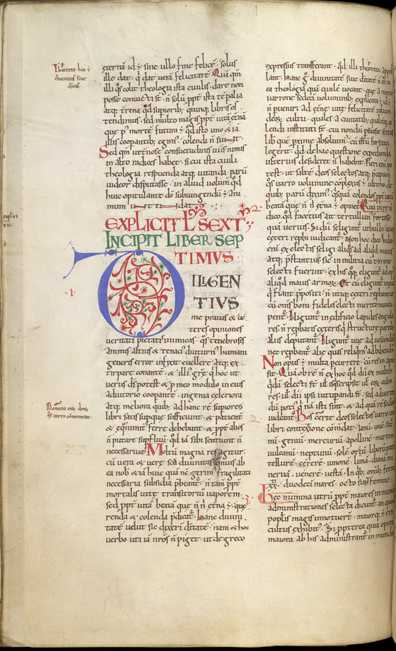
A page from an early 12th-century manuscript of The City of God by Augustine

Regarding themselves as successors of Peter the Apostle in the episcopal see of Rome, the popes asserted supremacy over Christendom. In the mid-11th century, reforming clerics assumed power in Rome. They sought freedom from lay control, banned simony (the sale of church offices) and vested the right to elect popes in senior clergy, the cardinals. Pope Alexander II issued the first papal bull granting absolution to warriors fighting the Moors in 1063, releasing those who confessed their sins from penance. The next summer, French, Italian, and Catalan troops joined Sancho Ramírez, king of Aragon, in besieging Barbastro. They captured the town and massacred or enslaved its people, but the Moors recaptured it within a year. The historian Ramón Menéndez Pidal calls the campaign a "Crusade before the Crusades", while the medievalist Peter Lock classes it among the "proto-crusades".

Pope Gregory VII became involved in armed conflicts with secular rulers over the lay investiture of church offices. The Investiture Controversy revived interest in the theology of war, prompting Anselm of Lucca c. 1083 to compile the late antique theologian Augustine's scattered thoughts on just war into a coherent synthesis. Drawing on classical philosophy, Roman law, and biblical precedent, Augustine argued that war, though sinful, could be just if fought for a rightful cause—defence or recovery of possession—declared by legitimate authority and pursued with proper intent.

A succession crisis in the taifa of Toledo enabled Alfonso VI of León-Castile to capture the city in 1085. The taifa rulers of Zaragoza and Valencia soon sought protection from the exiled Castilian nobleman Rodrigo Díaz de Vivar, known El Cid, (Note: Described by the historian Richard A. Fletcher as "the most celebrated operator of the age of the parias", El Cid was a successful soldier of fortune who amassed considerable wealth by serving both Christian and Muslim rulers and ruled Valencia independently for several years until his death in 1099.) while those of Seville, Granada, and Badajoz appealed to Yusuf ibn Tashfin, leader of the Almoravids, an Islamic fundamentalist movement. Yusuf invaded Iberia, defeated Alfonso at the Battle of Sagrajas, and reunified much of Muslim Spain by 1094.

== Confronting resurgent Muslim powers ==
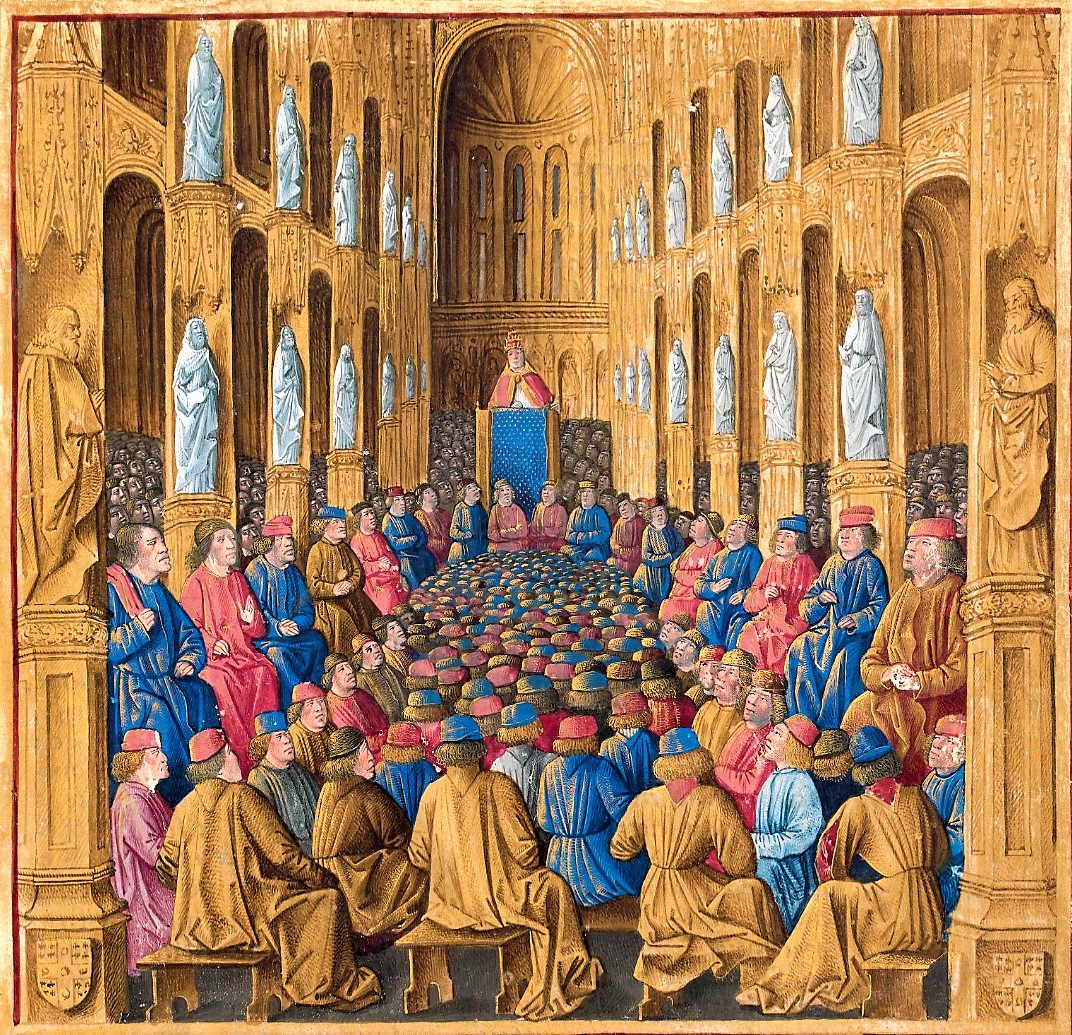
Pope Urban II's call for the First Crusade at the Council of Clermont (from the late 15th-century Passages d'outremer by Sébastien Mamerot)

At the Council of Clermont, Pope Urban II urged an expedition to relieve eastern Christians from Muslim rule on 27 November 1095, promising spiritual rewards to participants. Within months, thousands adopted the cross as a badge of their crusade vow and set out for the First Crusade. The campaign created four Crusader states in the Levant, whose defence inspired subsequent crusades for nearly two centuries. In Iberia, interventions by Islamic fundamentalist movements from Morocco revived Muslim power, although received limited support from the Muslim population of al-Andalus. Between 1095 and 1212, Muslim forces frequently won engagements but rarely achieved lasting territorial gains, leaving the strategic balance largely unchanged.

=== Aftermath of the First Crusade ===
The historian Richard A. Fletcher notes that crusading ideology lent "a sharper edge" to the concept of the Reconquista. In Iberia, William I Raymond of Cerdanya and Berenguer Ramon II of Barcelona were among those who took the cross in 1095, but Pope Urban II discouraged William Raymond and other Catalan magnates from joining the crusade, instead granting them remission of sins for defending local churches. His successor, Pope Paschal II, explicitly forbade Iberian Christians from abandoning lands threatened by Almoravid raids in 1102. Peter I of Aragon and Navarre, son of Sancho Ramírez, was the first Iberian ruler to choose to wage war as a crucifer ('cross-bearer') within the peninsula rather than in the Holy Land. In 1100, he constructed a castle near Zaragoza named Juslibol after the Crusaders' cry Deus vult ('God wills it'), but failed to capture the city. Sigurd I of Norway, the first crowned monarch to embark on a crusade, fought Iberian Muslims during his voyage to the Holy Land in 1108.

In 1113, the Pisans sought papal support for a campaign against the Balearic Islands. Paschal II offered spiritual rewards for freeing Christian captives and named Cardinal Boso of Sant'Anastasia as papal legate. A fleet led by Archbishop Pietro of Pisa sailed in August 1113, and was joined by Catalan and Occitan nobles including Ramon Berenguer III of Barcelona, William VI of Montpellier, and Bishop Ramon Guillem of Barcelona. Within two years, the armada of over 120 ships seized Ibiza and took Palma de Mallorca, but the Almoravids retook the islands in 1116.

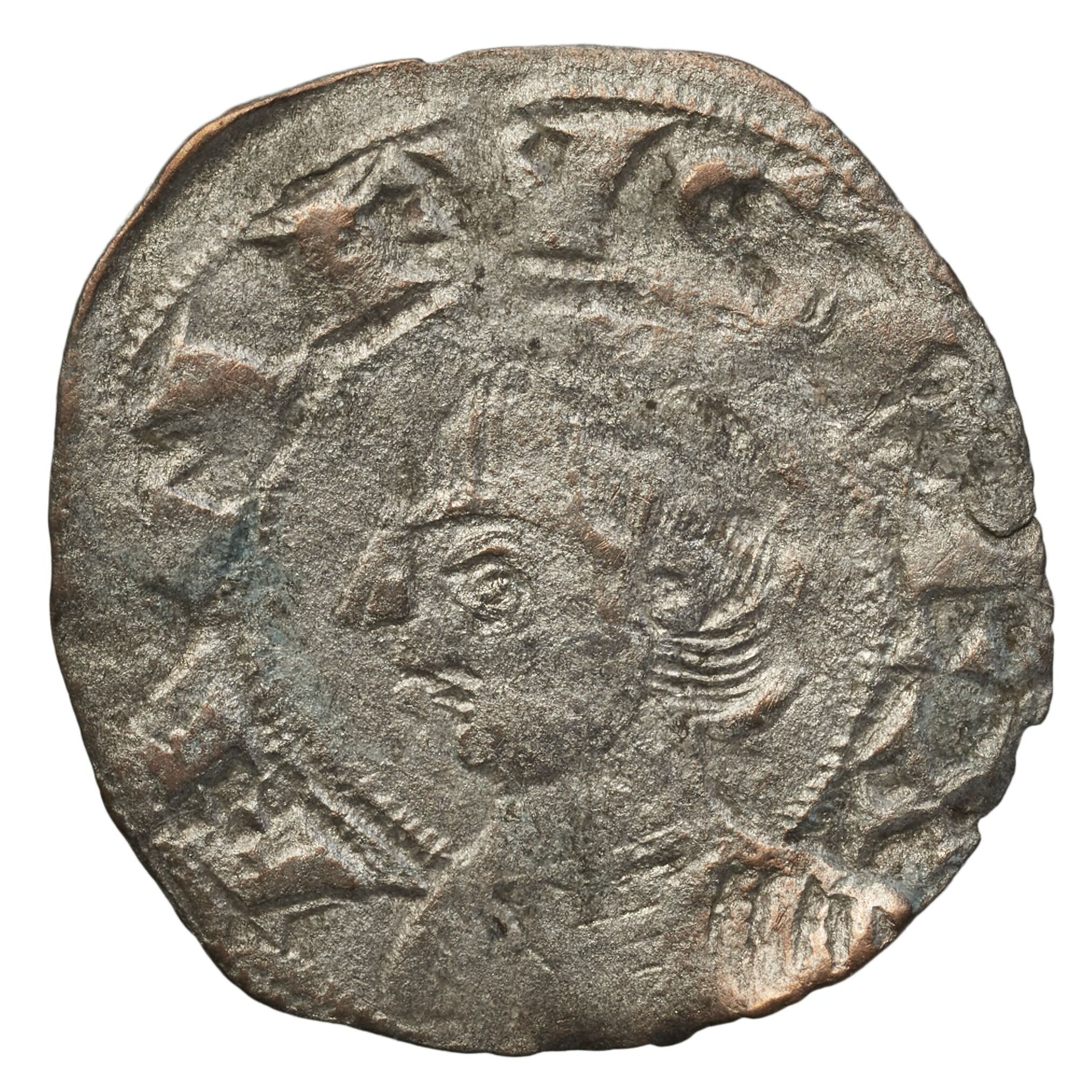
Coin of Alfonso I of Aragon and Navarre, a prominent leader of early Iberian Crusades

The Almoravids seized Zaragoza, the last taifa, in 1110. Alfonso I, successor to Peter I, sought external assistance to attack it in 1118. His allies included Occitan, Castilian, and Catalan nobles such as Gaston IV of Béarn, Diego López I de Haro, and Centule II of Bigorre. The siege began on 22 May 1118. At Alfonso's request, Pope Gelasius II granted absolution to those killed during the campaign, while Archbishop Bernard of Toledo, acting as papal legate, extended similar benefits to donors. Zaragoza surrendered on 18 December 1118.

In 1123, the First Lateran Council recognized that crusade vows could be fulfilled in either the Holy Land or Iberia. (Note: The historian Joseph F. O'Callaghan argues that Alfonso's conquest of Zaragoza prompted the papacy to strengthen its support for crusading in Iberia.) In the same year, Bishop Diego Gelmírez of Compostela proclaimed a crusade in Iberia. (Note: Diego Gelmírez issued his call for the crusade "in accordance with the lord pope's decree", but Fletcher regards this as an "unprecedented step".) Pope Callixtus II appointed Archbishop Olegarius of Tarragona as legate for a new Iberian crusade. The historian Joseph F. O'Callaghan associates this appeal to the Battle of Corbins in which Christian forces were defeated in 1124. The following year, Diego Gelmírez described Iberian crusades as "a road toward the ... Holy Sepulchre [in Jerusalem] which is shorter and less difficult". O'Callaghan interprets this as a plan for a crusade through Iberia and North Africa, while Jotischky regards it as an allegory for an easier path to spiritual reward.

After 1120, a new Islamic fundamentalist movement, the Almohads, emerged in Morocco. Denouncing the Almoravids as apostates, they proclaimed their leader, Ibn Tumart, to be the divinely guided Mahdī. In the 1130s, Ibn Tumart's successor, Abd al-Mu'min, assumed the title of caliph and began conquering Almoravid territories. The decline of central power revived the taifa system in al-Andalus.

Following the death of Alfonso I in 1134, his subjects rejected his will, which bequeathed his dominions to three religious institutions: the Knights Templar, the Knights Hospitaller, and the Holy Sepulchre. His brother Ramiro II, a monk, was proclaimed king of Aragon, while a distant kinsman, García Ramírez, king of Navarre. After the birth of his daughter Petronilla, Ramiro arranged her betrothal to Ramon Berenguer IV of Barcelona, establishing a lasting dynastic union between Aragon and the Catalan counties.

By then, Alfonso VII of León-Castile had become the leading Christian ruler in Iberia. His vassals included García Ramírez, Ramon Berenguer IV, and Alfonso Jordan of Toulouse. In 1135, he assumed the title Emperor of Hispania. In 1139, his cousin Count Afonso Henriques of Portugal overcame an Almoravid force at the Battle of Ourique and adopted the title of king. In 1142, he besieged Lisbon backed by northern crusaders sailing for the Holy Land, but failed to capture it.

=== Second Crusade ===
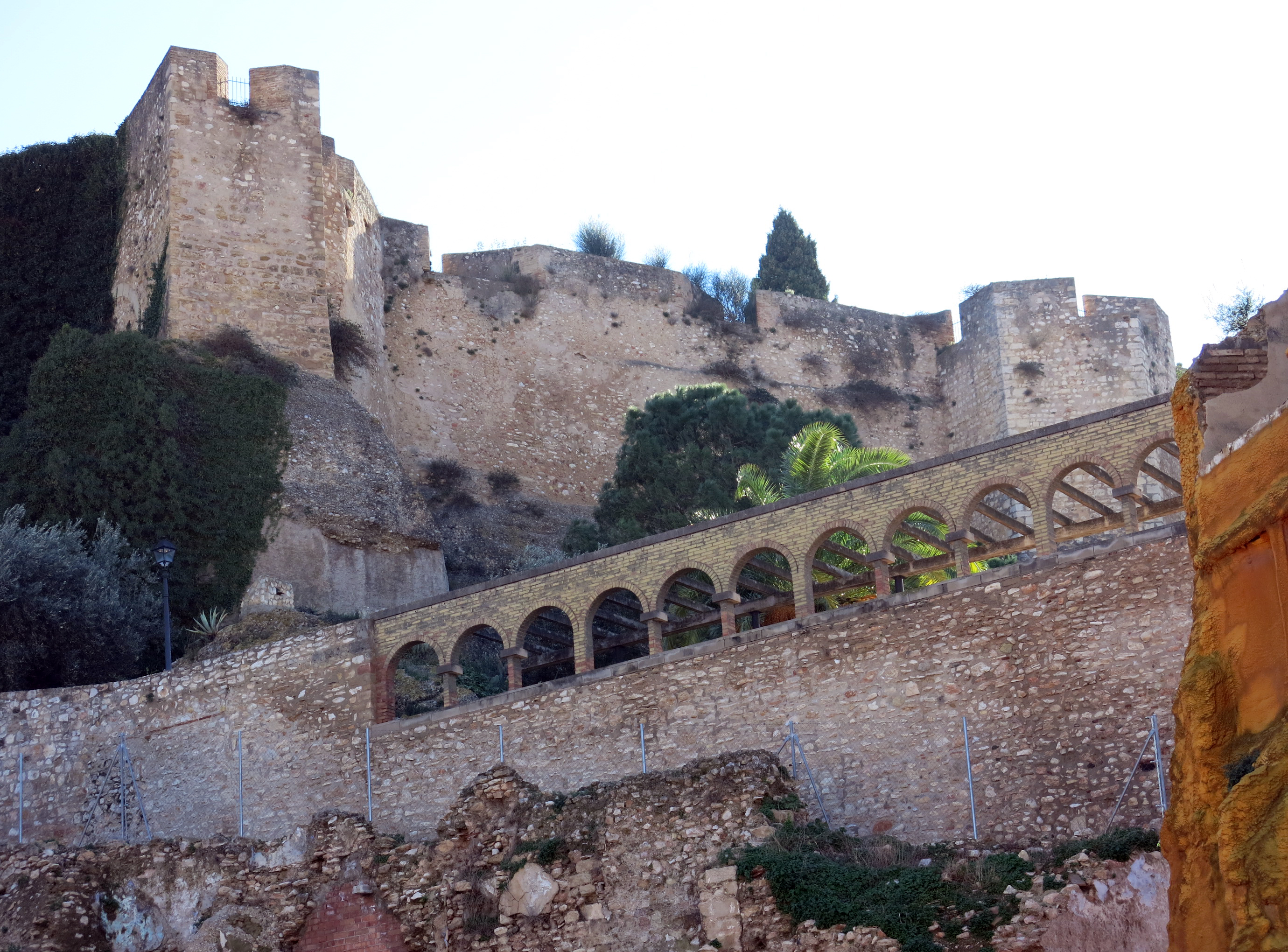
Walls of the Moorish fortress at Tortosa, captured by Ramon Berenguer IV of Barcelona during the Second Crusade

The Muslim capture of Edessa in the East in December 1144 prompted Pope Eugenius III to call for the Second Crusade. The following March, he appointed the Cistercian abbot Bernard of Clairvaux to preach it, and Bernard's sermons stirred widespread enthusiasm in France and Germany. On 13 April 1147, the bull Divina dispensatione expanded crusading privileges to those fighting the Moors.

The historian Jonathan Phillips argues that Afonso I of Portugal approached Bernard to seek his support in raising troops for a new attack on Lisbon. A fleet of over fifty Flemish, Frisian, German, and Anglo-Norman ships indeed reached Lisbon led by nobles like Arnold of Aerschot, and Hervey de Glanvill 28 June 1147. Despite some wishing to continue east, the crusaders joined the Portuguese in besieging the city. After five months, the city surrendered on terms of safe conduct, but many, including its Mozarabic bishop, were killed in the sack. After seizing nearby fortresses such as Sintra and Almada, most crusaders sailed for the Holy Land.

On Genoese initiative, Alfonso VII launched a joint assault on the city of Almería in July 1147. A fleet of 63 Genoese galleys and 164 other ships, with over 450 knights and 1,000 infantry, besieged the city, which capitulated on 17 October. Ramon Berenguer IV of Barcelona arranged another campaign with the Genoese against Tortosa, for which Pope Eugenius granted crusading privileges. Reinforced by crusaders from France and northern Europe, Ramon Berenguer and the Genoese captured Tortosa on 31 December 1148.

Fought across three theatres—the Holy Land, Iberia, and the Baltic—the Second Crusade achieved lasting success only in Iberia. In Fletcher's view, the Treaty of Tudilén (1151), which divided future conquests in al-Andalus between Alfonso VII and Ramon Berenguer IV, reflected their belief that Muslim rule was on the verge of collapse. At Alfonso's request, both Pope Eugenius III and Pope Anastasius IV granted indulgences for his campaigns against the Moors. By contrast, the failure of the Second Crusade in the Holy Land caused widespread disillusionment among the French nobility. (Note: In 1154 Louis VII of France, a leader of the Second Crusade, made a pilgrimage to Santiago de Compostela, but Alfonso VII was unable to persuade him to join a campaign against the Moors.)

=== Wars against the Almohads ===
The Almohad Caliphate and the five Christian kingdoms in the Iberian Peninsula c. 1150

The Almohads launched their first raid into Iberia at the request of Moorish leaders in 1146. Within a year, they had conquered much of southwestern al-Andalus, but some taifa rulers continued to resist them, often with the support of Christian powers. (Note: Ibn Mardanish, known as el rey Lobo ('the Wolf King') in Spanish, emerged as the most powerful of the new taifa rulers. A former professional soldier, he seized control of Valencia in 1147 and agreed to pay an annual tribute of 100,000 gold dinars to Ramon Berenguer IV of Barcelona in exchange for his protection. He also concluded a ten-year truce with Pisa and Genoa, allowing merchants from both cities to settle in Valencia and Dénia. In 1156, he swore fealty to Alfonso VII and subsequently accompanied him on an unsuccessful campaign to relieve Almería.) In 1154, the papal legate Cardinal Hyacinth offered crusading privileges to those fighting them and himself took the cross. (Note: Fletcher states that no military action followed Hyacinth's proclamation, whereas O'Callaghan links Alfonso VII's conquests of Andújar and neighbouring towns to it.)

The Almohads regained Almería and other towns by 1157, and Alfonso died returning from the campaign against them on 21 August. His sons succeeded him: Sancho III in Castile and Ferdinand II in León. The Treaty of Sahagún stipulated a future division of Portugal and western al-Andalus between them, but Sancho died in August 1158, leaving his three-year-old son, Alfonso VIII, as heir. Ramon Berenguer, who died in 1162, was also succeeded by an underage son, Alfonso II of Aragon.

Unlike his predecessors, Pope Adrian IV withheld crusading privileges from those fighting in Iberia, focusing instead on the Holy Land. The Almohads consolidated control over al-Andalus, exploiting rivalries among Christian rulers. In 1170 Afonso I of Portugal attacked Badajoz, prompting Ferdinand II of León to ally with the Almohads to relieve it.

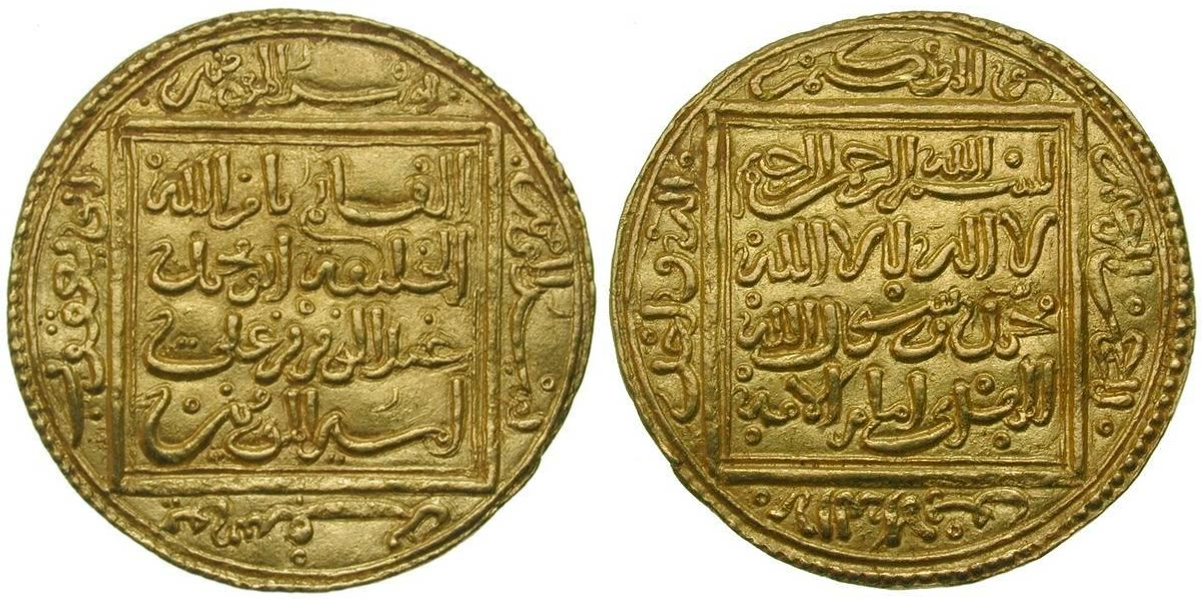
Gold coin of the Almohad caliph Yusuf I

In 1172, the new caliph Yusuf I attacked Huete. Cardinal Hyacinth soon granted remission of sins to the defenders, and Alfonso VIII relieved the town. Back in Rome in 1175, Hyacinth convinced Pope Alexander III to grant absolution to those who died fighting the Moors and remission of penance to those serving a year. In 1177, the kings of León, Castile, and Aragon met at Tarazona to coordinate campaigns. Alfonso VIII and Alfonso II captured Cuenca. Their Treaty of Cazola envisaged a division of Muslim lands and Navarre, and freed Aragon from Castilian suzerainty.

In 1184 Afonso I, aided by León, repelled Yusuf's attack on Santarém; Yusuf died of his wounds and was succeeded by his son al-Mansur. The next year Afonso's son Sancho I became king of Portugal. In 1188 Ferdinand II of León died and was succeeded by Alfonso IX, who did homage to his cousin Alfonso VIII of Castile to secure his crown. This humiliating episode led to his lasting enmity towards Alfonso VIII.

=== Third Crusade ===
In July 1187, Muslim forces destroyed the field army of the Kingdom of Jerusalem and captured the relic of the True Cross. Hearing of the disaster, Pope Gregory VIII issued the bull Audita tremendi that October, calling for the Third Crusade. The next year his successor, Clement III, extended crusader privileges to Iberian Christians fighting the Moors and ordered their kings to maintain a truce of at least ten years.

In spring 1189, around 12,000 Danish and Frisian crusaders, en route to the Holy Land, helped Sancho I of Portugal seize the Castle of Alvor, massacring its inhabitants. They were joined by German, French, and English crusaders led by noblemen like Henry I of Bar, and together they besieged Silves. Starved into surrender, the defenders were granted safe conduct, but the crusaders plundered the city. In July 1190, the Almohad caliph al-Mansur launched his first Iberian campaign from Morocco. His assault on Silves failed, and Sancho repelled his attack on Santarém with English aid, but in the next year al-Mansur captured Alcácer do Sal and Silves.

=== Almohad triumph and internal rivalries ===
In 1191, the former papal legate Cardinal Hyacinth was elected pope as Celestine III. He condemned the Iberian monarchs for their alliances with Muslims (Note: According to Ibn 'Idhari and other Muslim historians, Alfonso VIII of Castile promised to pay tribute and provide military assistance to Caliph al-Mahdi following the Almohad victories at Alcácer do Sal and Silves.) and issued crusading indulgences to encourage warfare against the Moors. Bypassing royal authority, he appealed directly to their subjects. At his demand, Alfonso II of Aragon, Alfonso VIII of Castile, and Alfonso IX of León, who had been on the brink of war, made peace.

In 1194, Archbishop Martín of Toledo led raids into Almohad territory, while Alfonso VIII ordered a fortress built at Alarcos on the Guadiana River. In response, the Almohad caliph al-Mansur launched a campaign from Morocco in early 1195. Although Alfonso sought assistance from León and Aragon, he confronted al-Mansur before reinforcements arrived. At the Battle of Alarcos on 19 July 1195, al-Mansur gained the last major Almohad victory over Christian forces, but withdrew within three weeks.

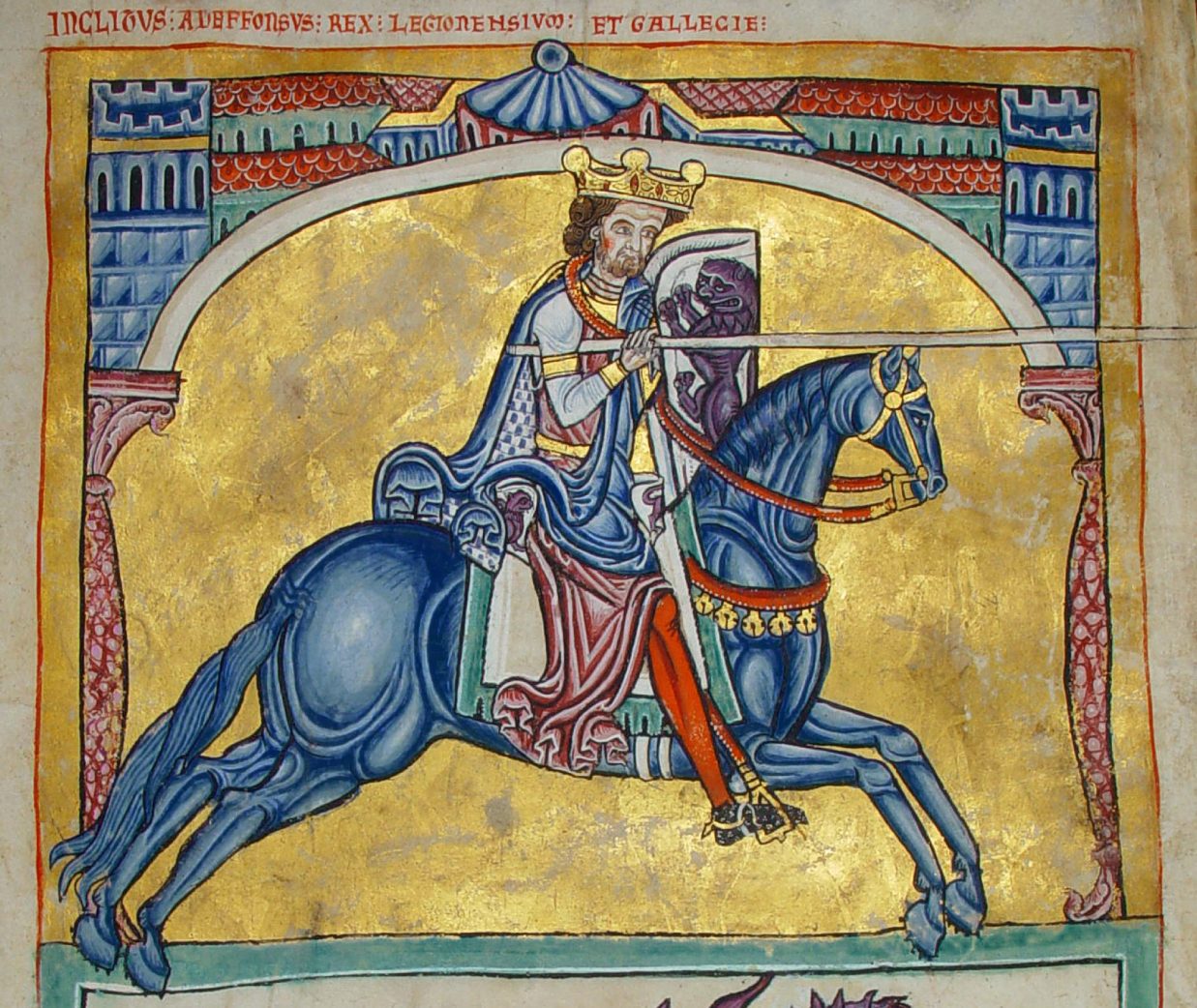
Alfonso IX of León, subject of a papal crusade in 1197 for his alliance with the Almohads (from the 13th-century Tumba A manuscript in the Cathedral of Santiago de Compostela)

Alfonso IX reached Toledo only after Alfonso VIII's crushing defeat, and their meeting revived old rivalries. He then forged an anti-Castilian alliance with Sancho VII of Navarre and the Almohads. When Almohad forces invaded Castile in early 1196, Alfonso IX and Sancho VII attacked from the west and north. The papal legate, Cardinal Gregory of Sant'Angelo excommunicated Alfonso IX and persuaded Sancho to make peace. By year's end, Celestine proclaimed a crusade against León.

In spring 1197, al-Mansur raided the Tagus valley but soon agreed to a ten-year truce with the Christians. Alfonso VIII then invaded León with Peter II of Aragon, while Sancho I of Portugal attacked from the northwest. Alfonso IX met al-Mansur in Seville, but failed to gain aid. He made peace with his Christian foes and married Alfonso VIII's daughter Berengaria in October 1197.

The truce with the Almohads revived rivalries among the Christian monarchs. Castilian and Aragonese forces invaded Navarre, but Sancho VII preserved independence with Almohad support. In 1199, al-Mansur was succeeded by his son al-Nasir, who conquered the island of Mallorca Peter II sought papal backing for a campaign against Mallorca and, after agreeing to hold Aragon as a papal fief, was crowned by Innocent III on 10 November 1204. Although the Aragonese barons rejected Peter's proposed property tax to fund the war at an assembly in November 1205, he launched on the mainland in summer 1210, capturing several fortresses around Teruel.

=== Crusade of Las Navas de Tolosa ===
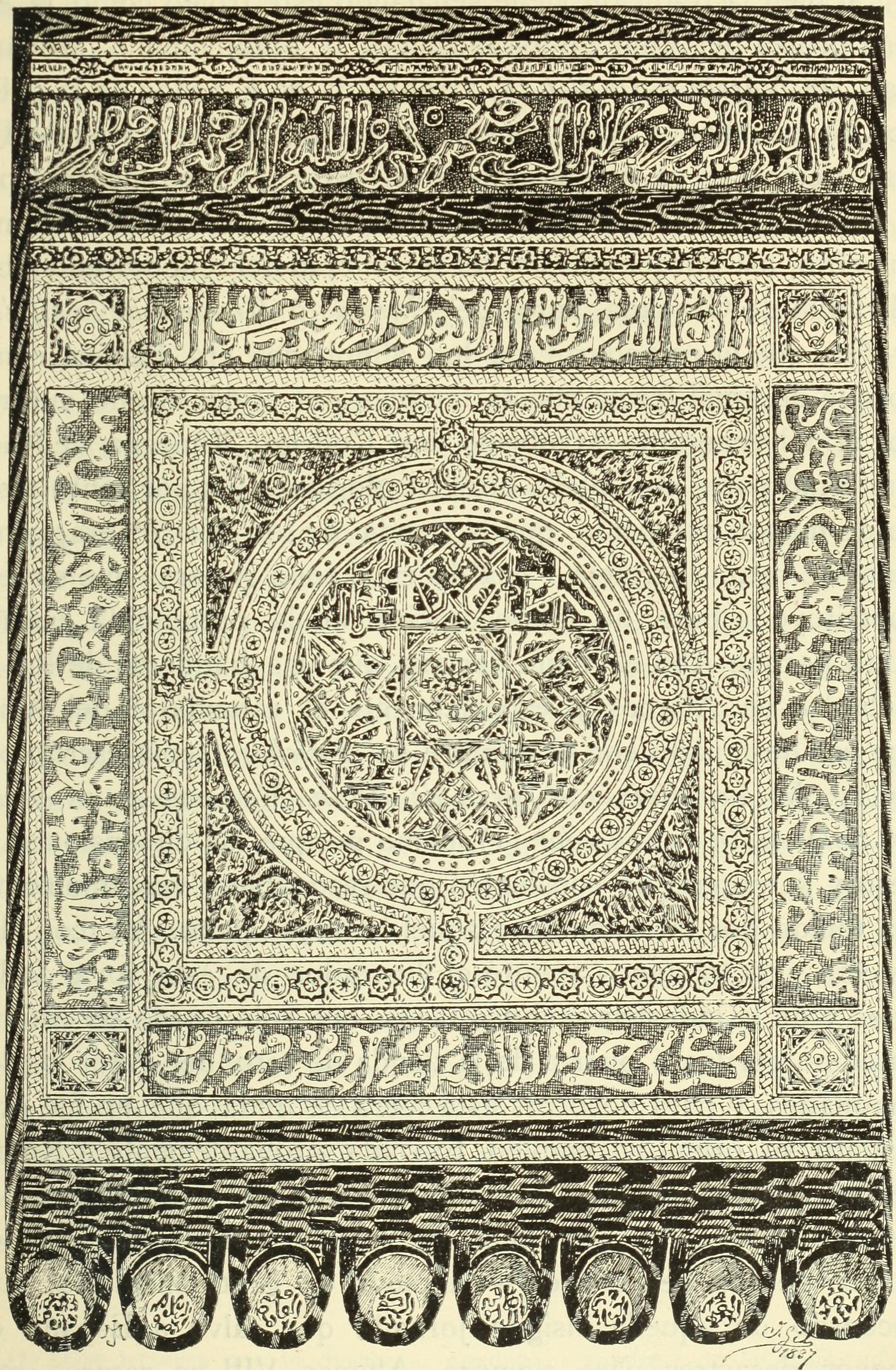
Tapestry covering the entrance of Caliph al-Nasir's tent, brought to the Abbey of Santa María la Real de Las Huelgas among the spoils of the Battle of Las Navas de Tolosa.

In 1210 Pope Innocent III wrote to Infante Ferdinand, heir of Alfonso VIII of Castile, declaring that kings were not bound by truces with infidels and referring to remission of sins—implying, according to O'Callaghan, that Ferdinand had taken the cross. When the truce with the Almohads expired, Christian raids resumed, prompting Caliph al-Nasir to capture Salvatierra Castle in Castile in July 1211. Alfonso ordered his vassals to gather at Toledo on Trinity Sunday. Though Ferdinand died meanwhile, preparations continued. Innocent directed French and Provençal bishops to grant indulgences to volunteers, while Archbishop Rodrigo of Toledo sought aid in France.

By Pentecost 1212, around 70,000 crusaders had gathered at Toledo. On the way, their leader, Archbishop Arnaud Amalric of Narbonne persuaded Sancho VII of Navarre to make peace with Castile. Upon their arrival, some crusaders carried out a pogrom against the local Jewish community. Further French forces arrived under the leadership of secular and ecclesiastical figures, including Archbishop Guillaume of Bordeaux. Peter II of Aragon also joined the campaign. Although the kings of León and Portugal did not participate, some of their subjects also came to Toledo.

The army left Toledo on 2 June. After Alfonso forbade plundering, most of the French contingent withdrew, but Sancho VII soon joined the host. On 16 July, the crusaders won a decisive victory over the Almohads at Las Navas de Tolosa. Al-Nasir fled, many of his troops were slain, and the victors seized rich spoils. The Muslim chronicler al-Marrakushi attributed the defeat to the flight of poorly paid soldiers. The crusaders advanced further, but shortages of supply and the outbreak of plague forced them to end the campaign. The victory was celebrated throughout Catholic Europe.

== Acceleration of the Reconquista ==
The Almohads' defeat at Las Navas de Tolosa deepened tensions between the native Moors and their North African rulers, contributing to the renewed fragmentation of al-Andalus. The Christian victory also reinforced the Christian kingdoms' determination to continue their wars in defence of Christendom.

=== Aftermath of Las Navas de Tolosa ===
In early 1213, Alfonso VIII of Castile captured several Moorish fortresses and concluded peace with Alfonso IX of León, who captured Alcántara on the Tagus. Meanwhile, Peter II of Aragon intervened in the Albigensian Crusade in Occitania on behalf of his brother-in-law, Raymond VI of Toulouse, in an attempt to mediate between him and the crusaders. When his efforts failed, Peter attacked the crusaders but was defeated by their leader Simon de Montfort at the Battle of Muret on 12 September. He was killed in the battle and succeeded by his underage son, James I. In the same year, the Almohad caliph al-Nasir was killed by one of his retainers, and the child al-Mustansir ascended the throne. In Castile, the young Henry I succeeded his father, Alfonso VIII, in 1214. Believing the Moorish and Albigensian threats diminished, Pope Innocent III withdrew crusading privileges from both Iberia and Occitania.

=== Fifth Crusade ===
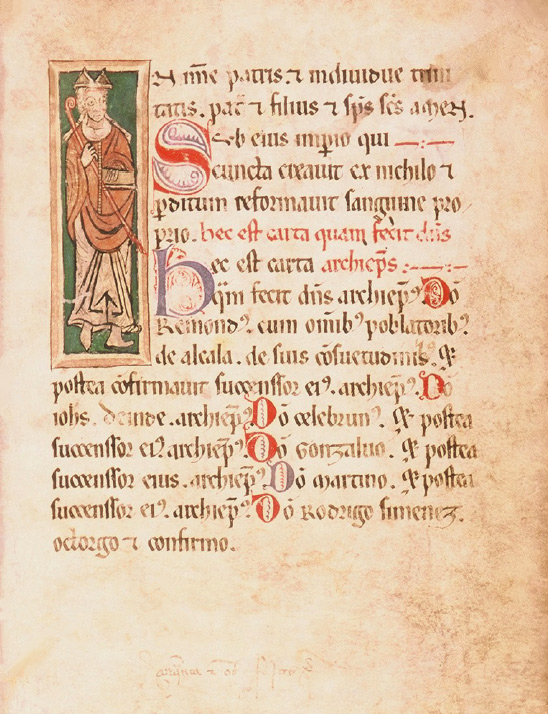
Rodrigo Jiménez de Rada, Archbishop of Toledo, leader of the 1219 crusade against the Almohad province of Valencia (depicted in the extended charter for the University of Alcalá de Henares, c. 1235)

Convoked by Pope Innocent III, the Fourth Lateran Council proclaimed the Fifth Crusade to the Holy Land in November 1215. It also standardised the crusade indulgence, granting full remission of confessed sins to all crusaders. In July 1217, Frisian and German crusaders reached Lisbon. The new king of Portugal, Afonso II, was unwilling to violate the truce with the Almohads, but Bishop Soeiro of Lisbon urged them to help recapture Alcácer do Sal. Although the Frisians continued east, the Germans under William I of Holland and George of Wied allied with the Portuguese and captured Alcácer do Sal on 18 October. The Portuguese later petitioned Pope Honorius III, Innocent's successor, to let the crusaders fulfil their vows locally, but he granted absolution only to those unable to proceed to the East.

Henry I of Castile died in an accident in 1217. His sister, Berengaria, secured the succession for Ferdinand III, her son from her former marriage to Alfonso IX of León, despite Alfonso's competing claim to the Castilian throne. (Note: Berengaria's marriage to Alfonso IX had been annulled on grounds of consanguinity in 1204 at the insistence of Pope Innocent III. Following his son's accession to the Castilian throne, Alfonso designated his daughters from his previous marriage as his heirs, thereby excluding Ferdinand from the Leonese succession.) Having already taken the cross, Alfonso attacked Cáceres in November 1218 with an army including foreign crusaders, such as Savari de Mauléon, but heavy rains forced their withdrawal. In June 1219, Pope Honorius granted indulgences for Archbishop Rodrigo of Toledo's campaign against Valencia. The crusaders took several fortresses but failed to seize Requena. He likewise extended the indulgence to Alfonso IX's attacks on Cáceres, which the King failed to capture in 1221 and 1222.

=== Disintegration of the Almohad Empire ===
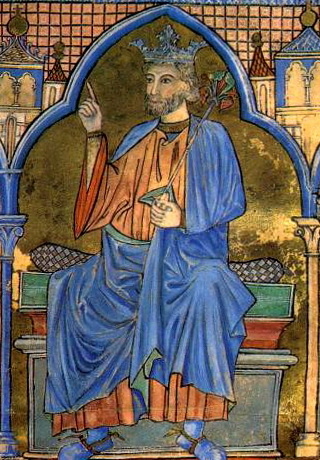
Ferdinand III of Castile, one of the most successful crusader leaders of the Reconquista (from the 13th-century Tumba A manuscript in the Cathedral of Santiago de Compostela)

The Almohad caliph al-Mustansir died in January 1224, and the ensuing power struggle undermined caliphal authority in al-Andalus. According to O'Callaghan, Ferdinand III of Castile took the cross when John of Brienne, former king of Jerusalem, married his sister Berenguela in April. The Almohad governors Abu Zayd of Valencia and Abu Mohammad of Baeza did homage to him, though Abu Zayd soon defected. Crusading privileges were granted for local causes: part of church revenues went to the noble Alfonso Téllez de Meneses for Alburquerque's defence, and his brother Bishop Tello of Palencia received indulgences to fortify Aliaguilla.

Pope Honorius III appointed Archbishop Rodrigo of Toledo and Bishop Mauricio of Burgos as protectors of the Iberian crusaders. After the Moors of Córdoba murdered Abu Mohammad in 1225, Ferdinand captured Baeza and Capilla. In 1228 Ibn Hud, a Moorish aristocrat, seized Murcia and broke with the Almohads, recognising the nominal authority of the Abbasid caliph.

James I of Aragon took the cross in April 1225. Abu Zayd secured peace by agreeing to pay a fifth of his revenues as tribute to Aragon, but was expelled from Valencia by Zayyan ibn Mardanish, a grand-nephew of Valencia's last taifa ruler. Abu Zayd converted to Christianity and sought James's aid, yet the king turned instead to Mallorca, which under Abu Yahya had become an autonomous corsair base. Pope Gregory IX authorised his legate Jean d'Abeville to grant indulgences to participants. In spring 1229, about c. 800 knights and over 2,000 infantry set sail on c. 150 ships. Palma de Mallorca fell on 31 December, and by 1231 most of the island's Muslims had fled to North Africa.

=== Christian expansion ===
In spring 1230, Alfonso IX of León captured Mérida, defeated Ibn Hud at Alange, and took Badajoz. He was preparing to attack Seville when he died unexpectedly on 24 September. His death enabled his son, Ferdinand III of Castile, to reunite the two kingdoms. (Note: Alfonso IX's two daughters and designated heirs sold their claims to the Leonese throne to their younger half-brother, Ferdinand III.) Ibn Hud was expelled from Murcia, but retained control of much of al-Andalus, including Granada, Córdoba, and Seville. His authority was soon contested by Muhammad I of the Banu Nasr.

Ferdinand III of Castile resumed his campaigns against the Moors in 1229. Two years later, Pope Gregory IX granted crusading indulgences to those joining the expeditions of Archbishop Rodrigo of Toledo or Ferdinand, or contributing funds. After Rodrigo captured Quesada and Cazorla, the Pope directed the Toledo clergy to support him for three years. Ferdinand then took Úbeda, compelling Ibn Hud to pay tribute. When Christian troops occupied part of Córdoba, Ferdinand besieged the city in February 1236 and forced the defenders to surrender on 29 June, granting them safe conduct.

James I of Aragon began the conquest of the divided taifa of Valencia in 1232, prompting Pope Gregory IX to grant indulgences to volunteers for three years. Valencia's former ruler, the convert Abu Zayd, by then known as Vincent, supported James's actions. In April 1238, with the support of French and English crusaders, James besieged Valencia, compelling Zayyan ibn Mardanish to surrender on 28 September in exchange for safe conduct.

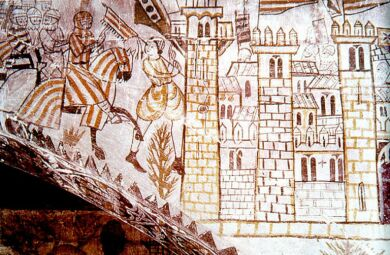
James I of Aragon enters the conquered city of Valencia (a mural in the Castle of Alcañiz).

After Ibn Hud was assassinated in 1238, his family sought Ferdinand III's support against Muslim rivals. In May 1243, al-Mutawakkil of Murcia paid homage to Ferdinand, permitting Castilian troops to garrison his capital. Rival claims to Muslim territories led to war between Castile and Aragon until the Treaty of Almizra fixed the frontier in March 1244. Thereafter, James I captured the remaining fortresses of Valencia, forcing Zayyan to flee to Tunis. James began planning a crusade for the Holy Land, but the Mudejars of Valencia rebelled, prompting Pope Innocent IV to proclaim crusades against them in 1248 and 1250.

Disputes with the Church and the nobility mainly prevented Sancho II of Portugal, son of Afonso II, from undertaking campaigns in al-Andalus, although the warrior monks of the Order of Santiago captured several towns, including Beja and Mértola. Sancho's brother, Infante Fernando formed an anti-Moorish alliance with the Leonese infante Alfonso of Molina. At their request, Pope Gregory IX in 1239 granted indulgences for a projected campaign, though none was launched. In 1241, the pope granted indulgences to those supporting Sancho's planned campaign against the Moors, and Portuguese forces captured Alvor and Paderne. As Sancho's conflict with the Church intensified, his brother Afonso deposed him with papal support in 1246. By 1250, Afonso III completed the conquest of the Algarve, capturing Faro and other towns.

Ferdinand III renewed his campaigns by besieging Jaén on the Guadalquivir. Instead of supporting the defenders, Muhammad I, now ruler of Granada, did homage to Ferdinand, thus Jaén's Muslim inhabitants surrendered in March 1246. The Muslims of Seville soon offered tribute, but the militant populace overthrew the moderates and accepted the suzerainty of the Hafsid emir of Tunis. Pope Innocent granted indulgences to those supporting Ferdinand, who began the siege of Seville in July 1247. The defenders failed to destroy his fleet of thirteen galleys with Greek fire, while crusaders from Aragon and Portugal reinforced the besiegers. Seville eventually surrendered on 23 November 1248. The fall of the chief centre of al-Andalus compelled several Moorish cities, including Jerez de la Frontera and Cádiz, to pay annual tribute to Castile.

== Survival of al-Andalus ==
After the fall of Seville, al-Andalus was reduced to what the medievalist Paul M. Cobb describes as "a hemmed-in, isolated, and besieged toehold at Granada". He characterises the Banu Nasr dynasty of Granada as "in many ways the greatest kings of Muslim Spain". Granada's fortifications, watchtowers, and skilled troops enabled it to withstand Christian attacks, while its distance from the main centres of Christian power facilitated the arrival of reinforcements from North Africa. The minor taifa of Niebla also survived in south-western Iberia. By the second half of the 13th century, the expanded Castile was the only Christian state bordering al-Andalus. Its alliances with the weaker neighbouring Christian kingdoms became increasingly fragile and uneasy.

=== Conflict over the Strait of Gibraltar ===
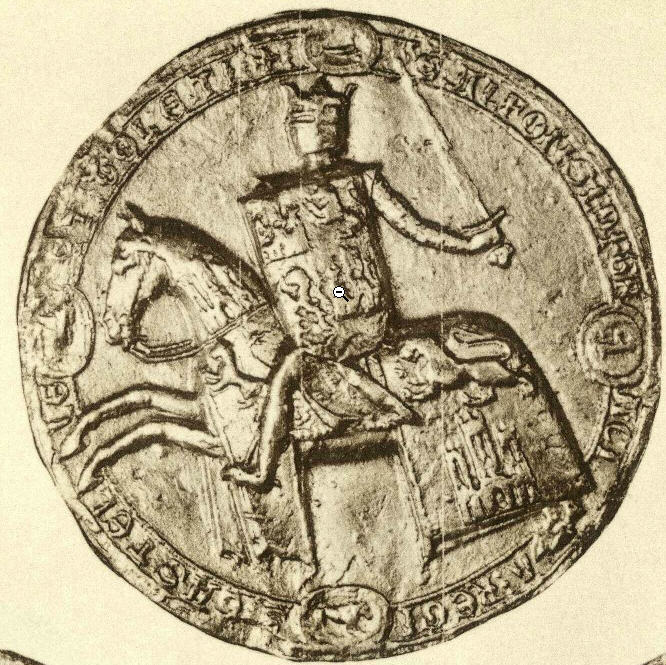
Seal of Alfonso X of Castile

In 1245, the Muslim ruler of Salé in Morocco offered to cede the town to the Order of Santiago. (Note: O'Callaghan identifies the Muslim ruler who is referred to as "Zeid Aazon, the illustrious king of Salé" in papal correspondence as al-Hasan, son of the Christian convert Abu Zayd, the former ruler of Valencia.) The plan failed when he was executed on the orders of the Almohad caliph al-Said. Preoccupied with the resettlement of Seville, Ferdinand III of Castile concluded peace with the Almohads before his death on 30 May 1252. His son, Alfonso X, succeeded him. To prepare for campaigns in North Africa, he established shipyards in Seville and ports at Cádiz and El Puerto de Santa María to strengthen his navy. In 1260, aided by a crusading indulgence, his fleet raided Morocco for three weeks; two years later, he annexed Niebla.

In 1262, as Alfonso prepared to invade North Africa, the Mudéjars—encouraged by Granada—rose in revolt across southern Spain. The uprising was crushed with crusader levies, but the revolt revealed that war could not shift to Africa while Granada endured. Meanwhile, the Marinids replaced the Almohads as North Africa's leading power, and in 1275 Muhammad II, Muhammad I's successor in Granada, allied with the Marinid ruler Abu Yusuf. Marinid forces crossed the Strait of Gibraltar, capturing Algeciras and Tarifa, and routed the Castilians at Écija. Alarmed by the Marinids' ascendancy, Muḥammad II persuaded Alfonso X to besiege Algeciras; yet, after taking Málaga from the Marinids, he assisted them in compelling the Castilians to lift the siege.

After the death of Alfonso X's eldest son, Infante Ferdinand, Castile descended into civil war between Alfonso and his second son, Sancho, who claimed the succession over his late brother's son, Alfonso de la Cerda. During the conflict, the father allied with the Marinids, while the son was supported by Granada. On his father's death in 1284, Sancho IV succeeded to the throne and continued to regard the Marinids as his principal Muslim adversaries. Meanwhile, under the reign of Peter III, son of James I, Aragon had seized Sicily from Charles I of Anjou, a papal vassal, thereby inciting a crusade against Aragon.

To ease Aragonese fears of Castilian expansion, Sancho IV concluded the Treaty of Monteagudo with James II of Aragon, son and successor of Peter III, in 1291, apportioning prospective North African conquests: territories west of the Moulouya River to Castile, and those to the east to Aragon. The following year, Sancho captured the key Iberian port of Tarifa from the Marinids. Amid domestic turmoil, the papacy withheld crusading indulgences for his campaigns, prompting him to invoke earlier bulls of Popes Innocent IV and Clement IV when preparing an assault on Algeciras in 1294. Sancho's death rekindled civil war in Castile during the minority of his son, Ferdinand IV, and enabled Aragon to occupy Murcia for several years despite prior treaties. In 1299, James II of Aragon even declared that final victory over the Moors could not be achieved without the partition of Castile.

Muhammad III, who succeeded his father in Granada in 1302, launched several raids into Castilian territory. In 1306 he captured the North African port of Ceuta from the Marinids, prompting an alliance between Ferdinand IV, James II, and the Marinid sultan Amir. Pope Clement V granted indulgences for the war against Granada, leading to the conquest of Gibraltar for Castile in 1309 the nobleman Alonso Pérez de Guzmán with the support of an Aragonese fleet; however, Ferdinand failed at Algeciras and James at Málaga, while Amir, having retaken Ceuta, allied himself with Granada. The setback weakened Aragon's commitment to anti-Moorish campaigns in Iberia, and thereafter the papacy offered only limited support for operations against Granada.

Papal indulgences for campaigns against Granada were reinstated in 1328, three years after Alfonso XI, son and successor of Sancho IV, attained his majority. Exploiting the Castilian nobility's desire to avenge a humiliating defeat at the 1319 Battle of the Vega, Alfonso consolidated his authority and launched incursions into Granada. The indulgences inspired several foreigners to join the campaigns. (Note: The Scottish noble Sir James Douglas was killed, together with three companions, fighting the Moors at the Battle of Teba in 1330. He had joined the Castilian forces during his journey to Jerusalem, intending to bury the heart of his king, Robert Bruce.) In response, Muhammad IV of Granada allied with the Marinid sultan Ali, and their combined forces recaptured Gibraltar from the Castilians in 1333.

=== Crusade of Salado ===
Following the fall of Gibraltar, Pope John XXII granted new indulgences in support of Castile, yet Alfonso XI concluded a five-year truce with Granada's new ruler, Yusuf I in 1334. The death of the Marinid prince Abu Malik during a raid near Jerez de la Frontera in 1337 led his father, Sultan Ali, to prepare a fresh campaign against Castile. When the Marinid fleet of some 200 ships sailed from North Africa, Admiral Alfonso Jofré Tenorio, aided by Aragonese vessels, attempted to intercept it, but the combined fleet was defeated at the Battle of Getares in April 1340.

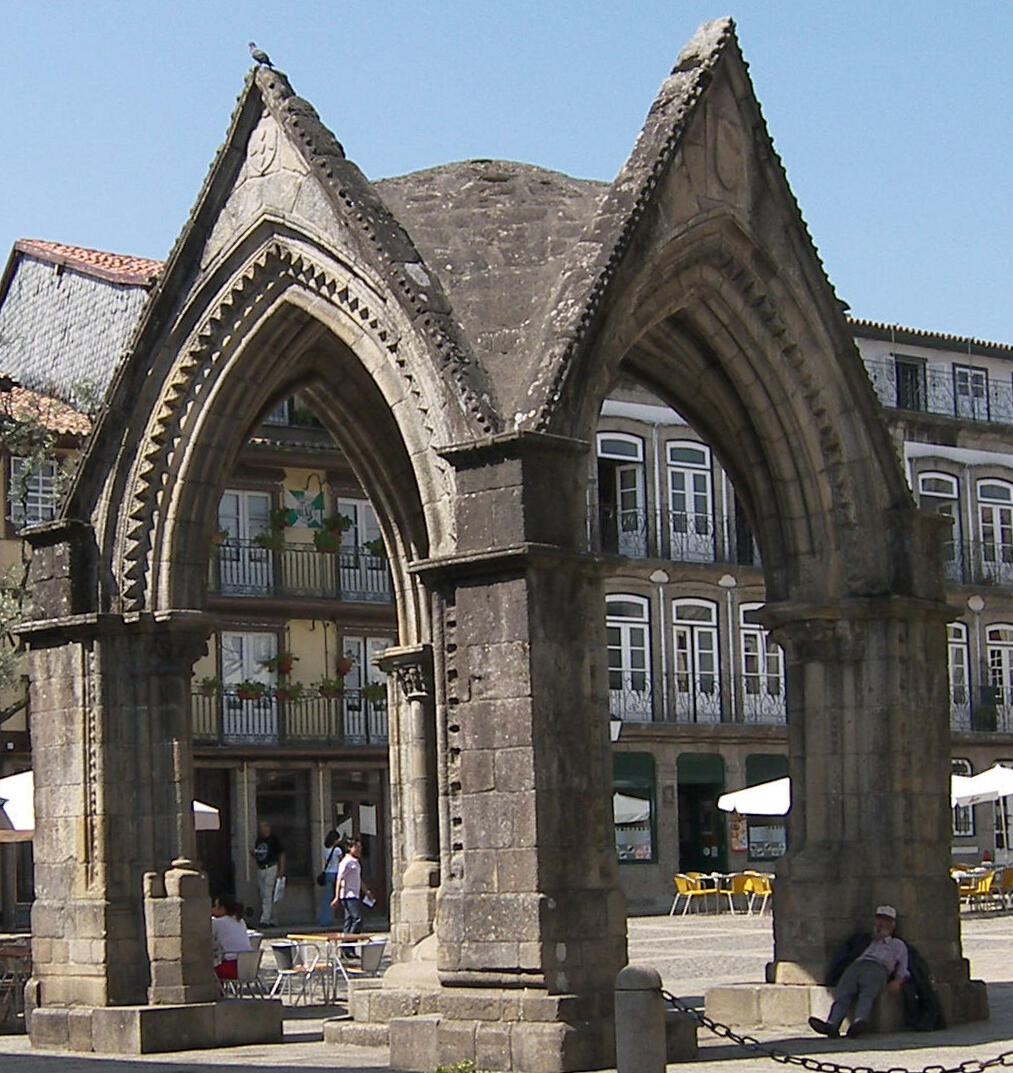
Monument of Salado, commemorating the Christian victory at the 1340 Battle of Salado in Guimarães, Portugal

Yusuf I soon joined the Marinid forces in besieging Tarifa, prompting Peter IV of Aragon to dispatch galleys for its defence. Pope Benedict XII proclaimed a crusade, and Alfonso XI advanced to Tarifa with Afonso IV of Portugal. On 30 October, the combined Christian armies, aided by a sortie from Tarifa's defenders, defeated the united Marinid and Granadan host at the Battle of Salado. This victory ended the last major Muslim invasion of Iberia from North Africa, though it left the Emirate of Granada largely intact.

Despite the considerable plunder gained from the battle, Alfonso required two years to amass the funds to besiege Algeciras in 1342, completing the operation only two years later with papal financial aid. During the siege, an Aragonese fleet supported the Castilians, and crusaders such as Philip III of Navarre and the English nobles Henry of Grosmont and William Montagu fought against the Moors. In July 1349, Alfonso turned his assault to Gibraltar, the Marinids' final foothold in Iberia, but the Black Death claimed his life on 27 March 1350, compelling his army to abandon the siege.

=== Decline of the Reconquista ===
Secure within the rugged Sierra Nevada, Granada could be subdued only through firm leadership and sustained national resolve—qualities Castile lacked for more than a century. During this time, the Reconquista assumed two main forms: constant frontier skirmishes and occasional large-scale campaigns, collectively known as the Guerra de Granada ("Granadan War") or Guerra del Moro ("Moorish War"). Castile and Granada frequently concluded truces lasting two or three years, though raiding persisted in the intervals.

Although Alfonso XI's son, Peter of Castile, sought crusading privileges from Pope Innocent VI for a North African campaign, he soon became embroiled in conflict with Aragon, sparking a war that endured until 1366. He was deposed in 1369 by his illegitimate brother, Henry of Trastámara, with French support. Henry's planned conquest of Granada stirred crusading fervour in France in 1375, but renewed hostilities with Portugal forced its abandonment. After his death, the claim of his son John I to the Portuguese throne, together with the Western Schism, produced rival papal crusades: in 1382 Pope Urban VI preached one against Castile, while his opponent, Clement VII, granted indulgences to John I of Castile for his war against John I of Portugal.

Piracy revived enthusiasm for anti-Moorish warfare towards the close of the 14th century. In 1398 the Avignon pope Benedict XIII granted indulgences to Valencians and Mallorcans who launched counter-raids against North African pirates. Granadan forces penetrated deep into Castilian territory in 1401 and 1406. King Henry III of Castile persuaded the Cortes (parliament) to approve an extraordinary subsidy for a counter-attack. Although Henry died of illness, his brother Infante Ferdinand, acting as regent for the young John II, soon renewed the war. The Castilian fleet defeated the Marinid navy on 26 August, but aristocratic indifference compelled Ferdinand to abandon the sieges of Ronda and Setenil in 1407. Reviving the campaign in 1410, he captured the strategically vital fortress of Antequera in September. Although no crusade bulls survive, Ferdinand's campaigns were supported by foreign volunteers, among them the French James de La Marche and the Burgundian Guillebert de Lannoy.

Ferdinand became King of Aragon in 1412, but his grants of lands and offices to his younger sons, John and Henry, enabled them to obstruct royal policy in Castile. Royal authority was restored under John II's favourite, Álvaro de Luna, by 1431. Meanwhile, Granada descended into anarchy amid rivalries between three claimants—Muhammad VIII, Muhammad IX, and Yusuf IV—permitting Castilian intervention. The ensuing campaigns, endorsed by indulgences granted by Popes Martin V and Eugenius IV, led to Castile's victory at the Battle of La Higueruela and a temporary expansion into the Emirate. Civil war broke out in Castile in 1438, undoing these gains, though Pope Nicholas V renewed indulgences for anti-Moorish campaigns between 1448 and 1452.

Nicholas V and Callixtus III were the first popes to regard crusading in Iberia within the wider context of the Ottoman advance. While recognising that Castile could not confront the Ottomans directly, they invoked its victories over Granada to urge other Catholic powers to take up arms against the Ottoman threat. Henry IV of Castile, son of John II, conducted raids into Granadan territory between 1455 and 1458 but sought to avoid prolonged and costly campaigns for which both his opponents and the traveller Gabriel Tetzel accused him of sympathy towards Islam. When frontier hostilities resumed, a coalition of Castilian nobles, notably Juan de Guzmán and Rodrigo Ponce de León, aided by urban militias, captured the weakly garrisoned Gibraltar in 1462.

== Granada War ==
Castile was racked by civil wars. The first, between King Henry IV and his opponents, forced him in 1468 to disinherit his daughter Joanna—suspected of illegitimacy—in favour of his half-sister Isabella. After Henry died in 1474, a second war broke out between Isabella and Joanna: Isabella was supported by her husband, Ferdinand, heir to the Aragonese throne, while Joanna was backed by her fiancé, Afonso V of Portugal. Isabella and Ferdinand triumphed in 1479, the year Ferdinand also became king of Aragon.

The union of Castile and Aragon under their rule ended Granada's ability to exploit rivalry between the two kingdoms. In 1480, the Ottoman capture of Otranto in Italy heightened fears that Granada might serve as a base for an Ottoman invasion of Iberia. From 1482, the emirate was divided between Muhammad XI in Granada and his deposed father, Abu'l-Hasan, in Málaga.

The final war against Granada began with frontier raids and evolved into annual campaigns that gradually eroded the emirate's defences. The fall of Ronda in 1485 cost Granada its western provinces. Under mounting pressure, Muhammad XII allied with the Castilian–Aragonese forces, first against his father and later his uncle, Muhammad XII. The capture of Málaga in 1487 ended any realistic prospect of Muslim naval aid from North Africa. In the closing phase of the war, Muhammad XIII allied with the Christians against his nephew who defended the emirate's capital. After an eight-month siege, it capitulated on 2 January 1492. In announcing the victory to Pope Innocent VIII, Ferdinand declared that the fall of Granada marked the end of nearly eight centuries of Muslim rule in Iberia.

== Warfare ==
While the medievalist Luis García-Guijarro Ramos concludes, crusading "contributed to Christian military expansion in Iberia only in a subsidiary way", O'Callaghan notes that "the organization and operations of Christian armies" underwent substantial development in the crusading period. During this period, the apostle James the Great was increasingly portrayed as the patron of warriors fighting against the Moors, and portions of the spoils they captured were frequently donated to his shrine at Compostela.

=== Organisation of armies ===
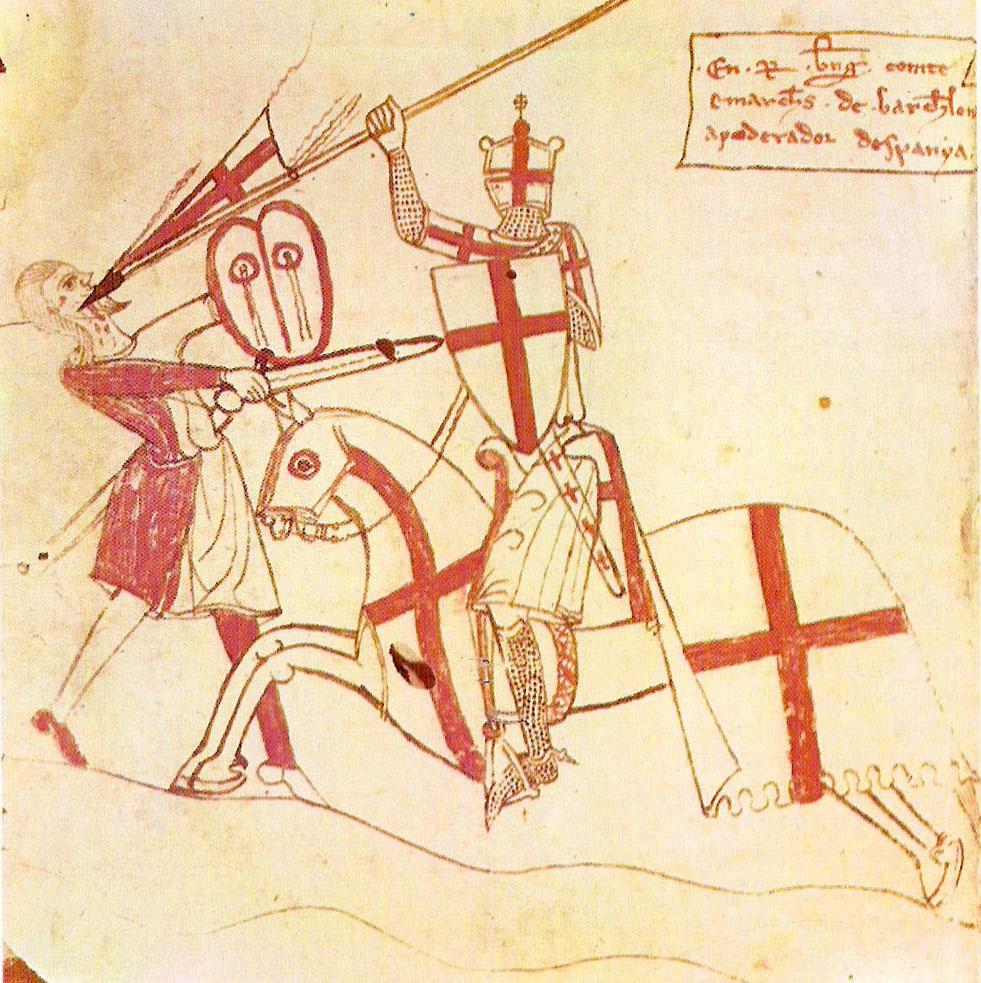
A knight fighting a footman (a miniature from an early 14th-century manuscript of the Usages of Barcelona).

Campaigns were usually waged between late spring and early autumn. With no standing armies, forces were raised for each expedition. Secular and ecclesiastical leaders were summoned by name. Under the Usages of Barcelona, musters were called by letters, envoys, or signal fires, requiring recruits to assemble fully equipped at a set place and time. Absence incurred fines, disinheritance, or excommunication. Nobles and townsmen generally served three months for pay or tenure. Disobedience, disorder, theft, desertion, or aiding the enemy were harshly punished.

Kings commonly led their armies in person, accompanied by sons, brothers, and a corps of knightly guards known as the mesnada. Bishops, abbots, and other prelates were expected to provide spiritual and military support. (Note: For example, during James I of Aragon's crusade to Mallorca, the Archbishop of Tarragona and the Bishop of Barcelona were each required to provide 100 knights and 1,000 serjeant; the Archdeacon of Barcelona Cathedral, 10 knights and 200 serjeant; and the Abbot of Sant Feliu de Guíxols, 4 knights.) Following the conquest of Lisbon, Sancho I of Portugal maintained the clergy's military duty only when the realm faced Muslim attack. Aristocratic self-awareness was strengthened by chivalric ideals, demanding lifelong devotion to arms. Noble children trained as squires under experienced knights and were knighted after proving themselves in battle. The leading magnates kept personal retinues, while royal charters defining municipal privileges also specified military obligations, often redeemable by a tax called the fonsadera. Fortresses were often manned by warrior monks of the military orders.

Corps fought under the standard of the king, a great noble, a military order, or a municipality. Defending these banners was a point of honour, and abandoning one was punished as treason. The royal standard was borne by the alférez or signifer, a high-ranking aristocrat who commanded the army in the king's absence. The militia banner was carried by the town's juez (judge), always of knightly rank. Lesser commanders included the adalides, leading cavalry, and the almocadenes, commanding infantry. Candidates for both offices were nominated by twelve of their peers. From the mid-14th century, frontier warfare was chiefly waged by the region's powerful Castilian nobility, including the Guzmáns and the Fernández de Córdoba family.

Naval forces were initially provided by the Pisans and Genoese. The first Aragonese fleet was established under James I, with a royal shipyard at Barcelona. Castile first employed its own navy at the siege of Seville, while Afonso III of Portugal built a fleet to defend the Algarve. Sieges were occasionally coordinated with naval raids on nearby coastal bases.

=== Military equipment ===
A knight's chief weapon was a double-edged iron sword, about 3 feet (0.91 m) long, with a hilt, used mainly to cut through chain mail rather than pierce the body. Knights also carried lances 6–7 feet (1.8–2.1 m) in length. They rode either a la jineta, in the Moorish fashion with short stirrups, or a la brida, in the French style with longer ones.

Foot soldiers bore lances or shorter javelins, while both mounted and foot troops employed projectile weapons, such as the crossbow. Armour comprised a mail coat over a quilted jacket, a helmet or iron cap, and metal or leather limb braces. Shields of wood, leather, or iron were round or kite-shaped, and warhorses might wear mail protection. Equipment varied by rank: great lords sometimes adorned their helmets with jewels. On the frontiers, the Almogavars—light raiders on foot or horseback—favoured daggers and darts.

=== Raids, sieges and battles ===
Cavalcades and raids were the chief forms of offensive warfare. Short raids of a day or two sought plunder, while longer expeditions, launched after the harvest, aimed at devastation. Minor raids rarely exceeded 300 troops; major incursions, involving thousands, were organised into vanguard, rearguard, and flanking forces.

Small garrisons were often taken by surprise, but great sieges could last for months. Besiegers frequently plundered the surrounding countryside, while defenders launched sorties against them. Walls were breached by battering rams or mining, and siege towers enabled archers and crossbowmen to fire from above, although such towers were often destroyed by burning oil poured from the walls. Trebuchets and mangonels were employed for bombardment. Psychological warfare included impaling the heads of captives or taunting besiegers about their wives' fidelity during long absences. Defenders were usually subdued by famine or disease. When a city surrendered, its inhabitants were generally allowed to depart or remain; if taken by storm, they were often massacred. Gunpowder was first used by the Granadans in Iberian warfare c. 1350, but the Castilians quickly adopted it for mines and small cannons, known as lombards. Cannons were employed extensively, together with large siege towers, during the siege of Antequera.

Battles generally resulted from sieges or raids, as pitched battles were avoided to limit casualties and territorial loss. The scale of combat is poorly documented. O'Callaghan estimates that major actions involved up to 10,000 troops on each side, though 3,000–5,000 was typical.

Booty from raids enhanced a soldier's standing, and border towns profited from the spoils of war. Municipal statutes held that plunder seized by the militia belonged to the urban community. It was auctioned publicly, with proceeds distributed as follows: one-fifth to the king; compensation to those who lost kin, horses, or equipment; payments to commanders and rewards to the distinguished; the remainder to the rank and file. Prisoners of war were usually ransomed by relatives or monastic orders founded for that purpose, such as the Trinitarians and Mercedarians. Ransoms were negotiated by alfaqueques, specialists fluent in Arabic.

== Military orders ==
Estates of the military orders in the Iberian Peninsula in the late 15th century

The military orders were religious communities uniting monastic discipline with a martial life, reflecting the diversity of Western Christian spirituality at the turn of 11th–12th centuries. As the historian Peter Lock notes, they combined "knighthood and monasticism in an innovative and appealing way" consistent with crusading ideals. Members took the usual monastic vows of poverty, chastity, and obedience, living communally within convents. They attended the divine offices and recited prescribed Paternosters. Meditative reading was not required of the lay brethren—knights and serjeants—who formed the majority, and little is known of their peacetime training.

=== Templars and Hospitallers ===
The Knights Templar, the first religious order dedicated to arms, arose from crusaders who, after the First Crusade, settled in Jerusalem to serve the Holy Sepulchre. Led by Hugues de Payens, they declared the protection of pilgrims their principal aim and gained papal recognition at the Council of Troyes in 1129. Though the union of knightly and clerical callings drew criticism, Bernard of Clairvaux became their chief advocate. The militarisation of a second order, the Knights Hospitaller—originally a charitable brotherhood—is attested from the 1130s.

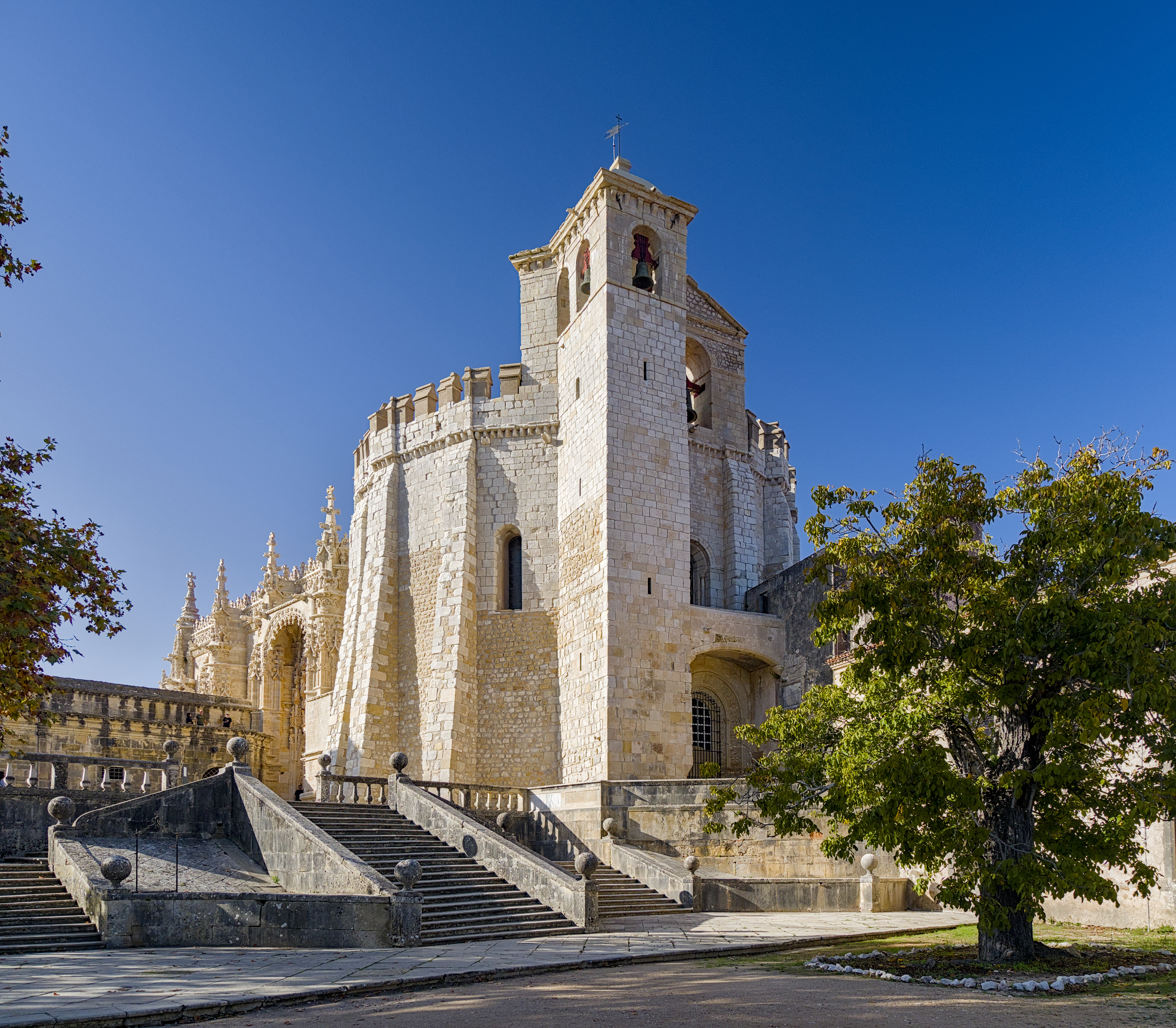
Convent of Christ (Tomar), held in Portugal first by the Templars, and after their dissolution, by the newly founded Order of Christ

Both orders gained extensive estates in Aragon after an accord with Ramon Berenguer IV of Barcelona over the will of Alfonso I. They held lands across Christian Iberia, with headquarters at Monzón (Templars) and Amposta (Hospitallers). As both sent much of their Iberian revenue to the Holy Land, Afonso I of Portugal required that their income be spent locally.

After the fall of the last Crusader strongholds in the Holy Land in 1291, the Templars faced mounting criticism. Acting on Philip IV of France's orders, all French Templars were arrested in 1307 for heresy, idolatry, and sodomy. Under royal pressure, Pope Clement V dissolved the order at the Council of Vienne in 1312. Across most of Europe, the Hospitallers took over Templar estates, but in Iberia two new orders were formed: in Aragon, the Order of Montesa received both Templar and Hospitaller lands in Valencia; in Portugal, the Order of Christ received the Templar holdings.

=== Iberian orders ===
The example of the Templars and Hospitallers inspired the formation of indigenous Iberian military orders whose resources were concentrated on warfare within the peninsula. The first such confraternity, or militia Christi, was founded in 1122 by Alfonso I of Aragon: the Confraternity of Belchite, whose members fought in exchange for absolution from sin. Around 1124, Alfonso established another confraternity at Monreal for overseas campaigns, while in 1138 Iberian prelates, led by Bishop Guifré of Barbastro and Roda, founded a third to defend his see. None endured long; Belchite is last recorded in 1136.

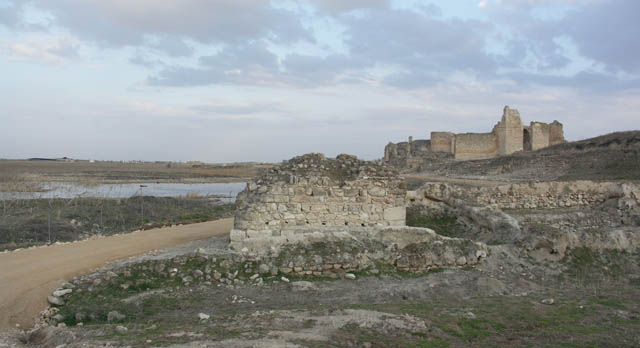
Ruins of the fortress of Calatrava la Vieja, the first seat of the Order of Calatrava, on the Guadiana River

The Order of Calatrava, first of the native Iberian military orders, arose after the Templars abandoned the border fortress of Calatrava la Vieja. In 1158, Sancho II of Castile granted it to Raymond, Cistercian abbot of Fitero, who gathered monks and laymen with remission of sins to defend it. Recognised by the papacy in 1164, the order gained wide estates across Iberia. In 1187 its monastic rule was codified, and it was placed, in theory, under the Cistercian abbey of Cîteaux.

The first Leonese order, that of San Julián del Pereiro, was first recorded upon its papal recognition in 1176. After its headquarters moved to Alcántara in 1218, it became the Order of Alcántara. The Portuguese Order of Évora, likewise attested in 1176, took the name of its new seat at Avis in the early 1220s. The Order of Santiago, the most prominent Iberian military order, was founded at Cáceres in 1170. Within a decade it came under the authority of the cathedral chapter of Santiago de Compostela and gained wide endowments across the Iberian realms and beyond. Its rule, derived from that of St Augustine, was confirmed by the papacy in 1175. Uniquely, Santiago accepted married men as full members.

Several short-lived orders were founded but soon incorporated into larger ones, such as the Order of Mountjoy, whose Aragonese branch passed to the Templars in 1196 and its surviving branch, the Order of Monfragüe, to the Calatravans in 1221. Aware of the harm caused by rivalries between the Templars and Hospitallers in the Holy Land, leaders of the Iberian orders at times made pacts to secure cooperation, the first between the masters of Calatrava and Santiago in 1221. Despite royal pressure, the orders generally remained neutral in wars among the Christian realms.

After the extensive conquests of the 13th century, the military orders turned chiefly to the defence of the frontiers—against both Moors and Christians—and to the colonisation of their lands. Under the patronage of the Portuguese prince Henry the Navigator, the Order of Christ directed naval expeditions along the Atlantic coast of Africa, thereby inaugurating the Age of Discovery. During the Granada War, the orders' military role briefly revived. By this time, the Iberian monarchs had assumed control of all the orders, at times appointing illegitimate or underage sons as their heads. Following the completion of the Reconquista, secularisation advanced steadily: within a century, all the orders had been incorporated into the royal crowns, and their members were released from monastic obligations such as celibacy.

== Finances ==
Crusading warfare, as O'Callaghan notes, "placed a heavy strain on the resources" of the Iberian Christian states "and required extraordinary financial support". Yet the royal archives of Castile, León, and Portugal have not survived, while in Catalonia only financial records from the late 12th and early 13th centuries remain. The considerable diversity of coinage in circulation further complicates the study of the available evidence.

From the 12th century onwards, unlike in much of Catholic Europe, the Iberian Christian monarchs compensated their vassals with stipends rather than land grants. These payments were chiefly drawn from ordinary royal revenues—such as tolls on pasturage, trade and market dues, fines, fees, and tributes from Jewish and Mudejar communities. Levies on clerical income emerged as a significant extraordinary source of finance for crusading expeditions, first introduced in 1199 as a one-off 2.5 per cent tax by Pope Innocent III. The Fourth Lateran Council later authorised a 5 per cent levy over three years to fund crusades in the Levant; yet the Iberian clergy's reluctance to comply provoked stern rebukes from Pope Honorius III. Under pressure from Iberian monarchs and prelates, he ultimately conceded a share of this tax to support campaigns within the peninsula.

Kings occasionally appropriated church revenues—most commonly the tercias (tithes reserved for ecclesiastical maintenance)—and at times seized the property of deceased prelates. The use of the tercias for crusading purposes was first authorised by Pope Honorius III for Archbishop Rodrigo of Toledo in 1219, and they later helped to finance Ferdinand III of Castile's campaign against Seville. Extraordinary taxes included the petitum (a lump-sum levy) in Castile and León, the bovaticum (a tax on draught animals) in the Crown of Aragon, and the monetaticum (a payment compensating the fisc for refraining from reminting coinage). The parias re-emerged as a significant source of royal income after the collapse of the Almoravid and Almohad empires. Iberian monarchs frequently contracted loans to finance military expeditions, often from ecclesiastical institutions, the Templars, merchants, and Italian bankers. Under Ferdinand III, towns and cities were regularly compelled to advance such loans.

From the 1430s, crusade indulgences were offered at a fixed rate. Under Pope Martin V the standard price was eight ducats, reduced by Eugenius IV to five florins and by Nicholas V to three. The establishment of a fixed charge increased the financial returns and augmented royal revenue in Castile. In 1460, Pope Pius II authorised the granting of indulgences to those engaged in the wars against Granada, stipulating that half of the proceeds be allocated to anti-Ottoman crusading efforts.

== Historiography ==
Fletcher observes that the attitudes of Iberian Christian chroniclers towards the Reconquista underwent a change in the 12th century. Whereas the Historia silense, composed c. 1120, emphasised the recovery of lost Christian lands, the expansion of the faith and revenge as the principal motives for Christian conquests, the Chronica Adefonsi Imperatoris, composed c. 1147, cites Old Testament passages to portray Alfonso VII of León-Castile as the commander of a divinely sanctioned war waged by a chosen people.

== Bibliography ==
- Barber, Malcolm (2004). The Two Cities: Medieval Europe 1050–1320. Routledge. ISBN 978-0-4151-7415-2.
- Bishko, Charles Julian (1975). "The Spanish and Portuguese Reconquest, 1095–1492". In Setton, Kenneth M.; Hazard, Harry (eds.). The Fourteenth and Fifteenth Centuries. A History of the Crusades. Vol. III. The University of Wisconsin Press. pp. 396–456. ISBN 978-0-299-06670-3.
- Bisson, T. N. (2003) [1986]. The Medieval Crown of Aragon: A Short History. Clarendon Press. ISBN 978-0-19-820236-3.
- Bysted, Ane L. (2014). The Crusade Indulgence: Spiritual Rewards and the Theology of the Crusades, c. 1095–1216. History of Warfare. Vol. 103. BRILL. ISBN 978-9-0042-8043-4.
- Cobb, Paul M. (2016) [2014]. The Race for Paradise: An Islamic History of the Crusades. Oxford University Press. ISBN 978-0-1987-8799-0.
- Collins, Roger (2010) [1991]. Early Medieval Europe, 300–1000. History of Europe (Third ed.). Macmillan International Higher Education, Red Globe Press. ISBN 978-0-230-00673-7.
- Fletcher, R. A. (1987). "Reconquest and Crusade in Spain c. 1050-1150". Transactions of the Royal Historical Society. 37. Cambridge University Press: 31–47. ISSN 0080-4401. JSTOR 3679149.
- Forey, Alan (2002) [1999]. "The Military Orders, 1120–1312". In Riley-Smith, Jonathan (ed.). The Oxford History of the Crusades. Oxford University Press. pp. 15–34. ISBN 978-0-1928-0312-2.
- García-Guijarro Ramos, Luis (2016). "Christian Expansion in Medieval Iberia: Reconquista or Crusade". In Boas, Adrian J. (ed.). The Crusader World. The Routledge Worlds. Routledge. pp. 163–178. ISBN 978-0-415-82494-1.
- Harvey, L. P. (1990). Islamic Spain 1250 to 1500. The University of Chicago Press. ISBN 978-0-226-31962-9.
- Housley, Norman (2001) [1992]. The Later Crusades: From Lyons to Alcazar, 1274–1580. Oxford University Press. ISBN 978-0-19-822136-4.
- Jaspert, Nikolas (2006) [2003]. The Crusades. Routledge. ISBN 978-0-4153-5968-9.
- Jotischky, Andrew (2017) [2004]. Crusading and the Crusader States (Second ed.). Routledge. ISBN 978-1-1388-0806-5.
- Linehan, Peter (2011). Spain, 1157-1300: A Partible Inheritance. A History of Spain. Wiley-Blackwell. ISBN 978-1-444-34268-0.
- Lock, Peter (2006). The Routledge Companion to the Crusades. Routledge Companion to History. Routledge. ISBN 978-0-4153-9312-6.
- Löhr, Winrich (2007). "Western Christianities". In Mitchell, Margaret M.; Young, Frances M. (eds.). Constantine to c. 600. The Cambridge History of Christianity. Vol. II. Cambridge University Press. pp. 9–51. ISBN 978-0-521-81244-3.
- Luttrell, Anthony (2002) [1999]. "The Military Orders, 1312–1798". In Riley-Smith, Jonathan (ed.). The Oxford History of the Crusades. Oxford University Press. pp. 323–362. ISBN 978-0-1928-0312-2.
- Madden, Thomas F. (2013). The Concise History of the Crusades. Critical Issues in World and International History (Third ed.). Rowman & Littlefield. ISBN 978-1-4422-1575-7.
- Mayer, Hans Eberhard (2009) [1965]. The Crusades. Translated by John Gillingham (Second ed.). Oxford University Press. ISBN 978-0-19-873097-2.
- Menéndez Pidal, Ramón (2016) [1934]. The Cid and His Spain. Routledge. ISBN 978-1-315-53749-8.
- Mitchell, Margaret M. (2006). "Gentile Christianity". In Mitchell, Margaret M.; Young, Frances M. (eds.). Origins to Constantine. The Cambridge History of Christianity. Vol. I. Cambridge University Press. pp. 103–124. ISBN 978-0-521-81239-9.
- Nicholson, Helen (2004). The Crusades. Greenwood Guides to Historic Events of the Medieval World. Greenwood Press. ISBN 978-0-313-32685-1.
- O'Callaghan, Joseph F. (2003). Reconquest and Crusade in Medieval Spain. The Middle Ages. University of Pennsylvania Press. ISBN 978-0-8122-1889-3.
- Phillips, Jonathan (July 1997). "St Bernard of Clairvaux, The Low Countries and the Lisbon Letter of the Second Crusade". The Journal of Ecclesiastical History. 48 (3). Cambridge University Press: 485–497. doi:10.1017/S0022046900014895. ISSN 0022-0469.
- Reilly, Bernard F. (1992). The Contest of Christian and Muslim Spain, 1031-1157. A History of Spain. Blackwell Publishers. ISBN 978-0-631-16913-0.
- Rousset, Paul (1957). Histoire des croisades [A History of the Crusades] (in French). Payot. OCLC 418914213.
- Ruiz, Teofilo F. (2011). Spain's Centuries of Crisis: 1300-1474. A History of Spain. Blackwell Publishing. ISBN 978-1-4051-2789-9.
- Safran, Janina M. (2013). Defining Boundaries in al-Andalus: Muslims, Christians, and Jews in Islamic Iberia. Cornell University Press. ISBN 978-0-8014-6801-8.
- Schäferdier, Knut (2007). "Germanic and Celtic Christianities". In Mitchell, Margaret M.; Young, Frances M. (eds.). Constantine to c. 600. The Cambridge History of Christianity. Vol. II. Cambridge University Press. pp. 52–69. ISBN 978-0-521-81244-3.
- Trombley, Frank (2006). "Overview: The Geographical Spread of Christianity". In Mitchell, Margaret M.; Young, Frances M. (eds.). Origins to Constantine. The Cambridge History of Christianity. Vol. I. Cambridge University Press. pp. 302–313. ISBN 978-0-521-81239-9.
- Tyerman, Christopher (2007) [2006]. God's War: A History of the Crusades. Penguin Books. ISBN 978-0-1402-6980-2.
