= Siege of Cáceres (1218) =

The siege of Cáceres of 1218 was an Iberian crusade organized by King Alfonso IX of León with the goal of capturing the fortified city of Cáceres from the Almohad Caliphate. After the environs of Cáceres were devastated, the siege itself began in the middle of November. It had to be abandoned before Christmas (25 December) on account of heavy rains and flooding.

The expedition was international. Besides the Leonese and the Spanish military orders, contingents from Castile and Gascony also participated, the latter led by the warrior-poet Savaric de Mauléon. The expedition took place simultaneously with the Fifth Crusade and attracted some crusaders from that endeavour.

== Background ==
=== Connection to the Fifth Crusade ===
In 1217, following the capture of Alcácer do Sal by a group of crusaders en route to the Holy Land, Count William I of Holland, one of their leaders, wrote to Pope Honorius III asking for instructions. He noted that Kings Sancho VII of Navarre and Alfonso IX of León were preparing to go to war against the Almohad Caliphate the following year and that he was willing to join them. Honorius' response is dated 6 January 1218. The pope permitted some of the crusaders to commute their vows to service with the kings of Spain. In a document of December 1220, Honorius confirms what the crusaders had reported in 1217, that Alfonso IX had taken a crusade vow and "assumed the sign of the cross".

=== Gascon involvement ===
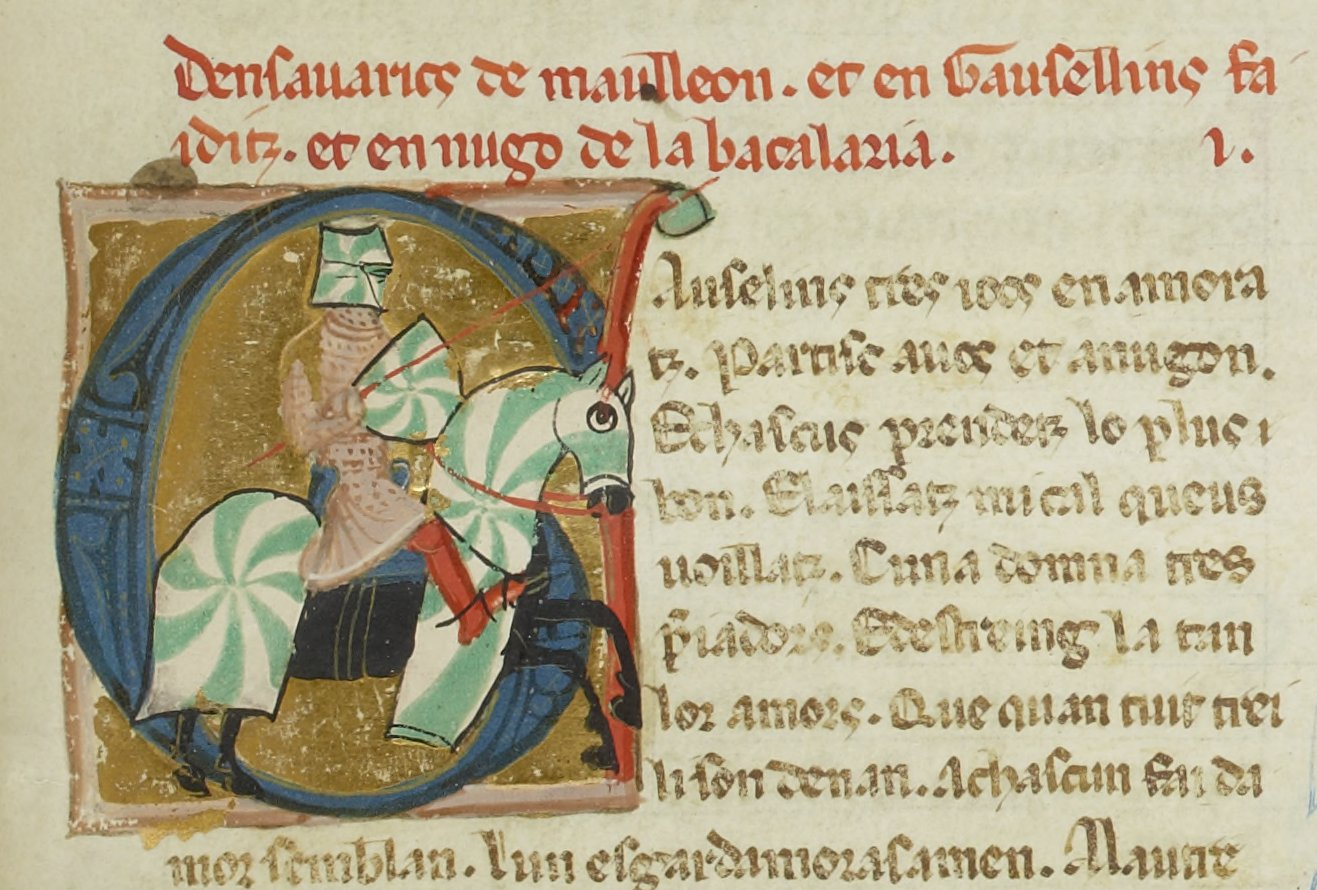
Savaric, knight and troubadour

The pope's letter of 1218 was probably delivered by the archbishop of Toledo, Rodrigo Jiménez de Rada, who was returning from a long visit to Rome. Since Rodrigo stopped in Bordeaux on the way to Spain, he may have informed Archbishop Guillaume Amanieu of Bordeaux, who had been involved in recruiting Gascons for campaign of Las Navas de Tolosa in 1212. It is possible that Guillaume Amanieu was also involved in recruiting Gascons for the campaign of 1218.

According to the principal Spanish source, the Anales toledanos primeros, the Gascon contingent at Cáceres was led by Savaric de Mauléon, a baron of Poitou well known for his service to the English crown. His involvement may be related to the alliance between England and León dating back to 1207 and directed against Alfonso VIII of Castile, who had invaded Gascony. In June and July 1218, Savaric made donations to religious houses as was customary for crusaders, although the text of the charters indicate that he was still planning to go to the Holy Land at the time.

=== Preparations ===
In January 1218, Honorius III recognized the archbishop of Toledo as the primate of Spain and the papal legate in charge of organizing the crusade in Castile and Aragon. It is probable that the impetus for the crusade against Cáceres came from Rodrigo's long stay in Rome in the latter half of 1217. As legate, Rodrigo had permission to allocate vacant benefices and to absolve persons who comitted violence against clergy or clergy who did not pay the twentieth. Alfonso IX was ordered to obey him with respect to the crusade, a command that was necessary because León did not fall under Rodrigo's legation.

Under papal pressure and through Rodrigo's mediation, Alfonso IX made peace with Castile (then ruled by his son, Ferdinand III) on 26 August 1218. The treaty specified that Castilian subjects could participate in Leonese wars against the Almohads, thus evading the Castilian truce. The Chronicon mundi of Lucas de Tuy makes clear that this peace agreement, as well as the defeat of certain rebels in León, were prerequisites for the 1218 campaign.

== Campaign ==
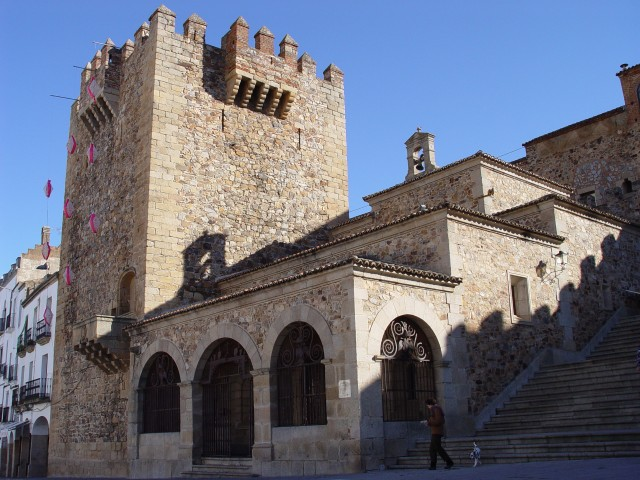
The Torre de Bujaco, a contemporary tower in Cáceres

The campaign against Cáceres took place unusually late in the year. While most campaign was done by October, the siege of Cáceres was not begun until the middle of November 1218. The reasons for the delay are not known. Alfonso may have been awaiting the arrival of the Gascons, he may have been avoiding the summer heat or he may have been delayed by an uncertain situation with Portugal, which broke into open war the following year. There are two main sources for the campaign, the Anales toledanos primeros and the Chronicon mundi. In addition, the absence Alfonso IX from his kingdom is corroborated by the lack of surviving charters from late 1218.

The Anales lists the contingents of the army as the military orders; men from León, Castile and unspecified "other kingdoms"; and the Gascons under Savaric. The king of Castile, however, was not involved, preferring to maintain his truce with the Almohads. Castilian forces appear to have joined up with the army in the Extremadura. Savaric was a troubadour and there is evidence that other troubadours travelled in his following to Spain, including Uc de Saint-Circ and Jausbert de Puycibot. If so, they were probably at Cáceres. Although the sources do not say so explicitly, it is it likely that Rodrigo was with the army. The unspecified "other kingdoms" which supplied troops were probably other peninsular kingdoms, like Aragon, Navarre and Portugal.

According to the Chronicon, Alfonso, "having gathered a large army ... devastated with iron and flame the trees, vineyards and fields around Cáceres." According to the Anales, the siege that followed lasted about a month, from the middle of November until nearly Christmas. The siege had to be abandoned on account of the heavy rains. In addition to the heavy rains and flooding, the expedition was probably underfunded, as evidenced by Rodrigo's efforts to secure greater funding in 1219.

The campaign against Cáceres may not have been a compete failure. The castle of Miravete may have been taken at this time. It appears shortly after in the hands of Ruy Bermúdez, described as a cruçado (crusader) holding it for the Order of Calatrava, which received it from the concejo of Plasencia. Miravete was a highly advanced position in the direction of Cáceres. The capture of Alburquerque, then the southernmost outpost of the Leonese kingdom, may be linked to the 1218 campaign, but all that is known for certain is that Alfonso Téllez captured it with his own forces at least seven years before 1225.

== Aftermath ==
In the aftermath of the failure at Cáceres, through bribery and persuasion, Rodrigo got half the twentieth intended for the Egyptian crusade. His crusade against Requena in 1219–1220, while more successful than the expedition against Cáceres, failed to capture its ultimate target.

Savaric's absence from Poitou while on crusade in Spain is matched by a dearth of documents from September to December 1218, but he was back in France in 1219 to prepare to join the Fifth Crusade in Egypt. It is evidence that "many crusaders ... saw Spain and Palestine as simply the western and eastern theaters in the same war."

The earliest attestation of the Spanish word cruzada is in the passage of the Anales Toledanos pertaining to the siege of Cáceres. Likewise, the use of cruçado (crusader) in the charter for Ruy Bermúdez is one of its earliest instances.

Cáceres was finally conquered by Alfonso IX in 1227.

== Bibliography ==
- Ayala Martínez, Carlos de (2013). "El término «cruzada» en la documentación castellana de los siglos XII y principios del XIII". Intus-Legere Historia. 7 (2): 77–93. doi:10.15691/07176864.2014.101.
- Falque, Emma, ed. (2003). Lucae Tudensis: Chronicon Mundi. Brepols.
- García Fitz, Francisco (2002). Relaciones políticas y guerra: la experiencia castellano-leonesa frente al Islam, siglos XI–XIII. Universidad de Sevilla.
- Gómez, Miguel (2018). "Archbishop Rodrigo, Honorius III, and the Fifth Crusade in Spain". In Jessalynn L. Bird; Damian J. Smith (eds.). The Fourth Lateran Council and the Crusade Movement: The Impact of the Council of 1215 on Latin Christendom and the East. Brepols. pp. 193–215.
- González, Julio (1944). Alfonso IX. Consejo Superior de Investigaciones Científicas.
- Lomax, Derek W. (1978). The Reconquest of Spain. Longman.
- Pick, Lucy K. (2004). Conflict and Coexistence: Archbishop Rodrigo and the Muslims and Jews of Medieval Spain. University of Michigan Press.
- Riquer, Martín de (1975). Los trovadores: historia literaria y textos. Editorial Planeta.
- Rodríguez López, Ana (1994). La consolidación territorial de la monarquía feudal castellana: Expansión y fronteras durante el reinado de Fernando III. Consejo Superior de Investigaciones Científicas.
- Torres Balbás, Leopoldo (1948). "Cáceres y su cerca almohade" (PDF). Al-Andalus. 13: 446–472.
- Villegas-Aristizábal, Lucas (2018). "Did Savary of Mauléon Participate in Alfonso IX's Failed Siege of Cáceres in 1218?". De Medio Aevo. 6 (12): 99–118.
