= Crusade against Requena =

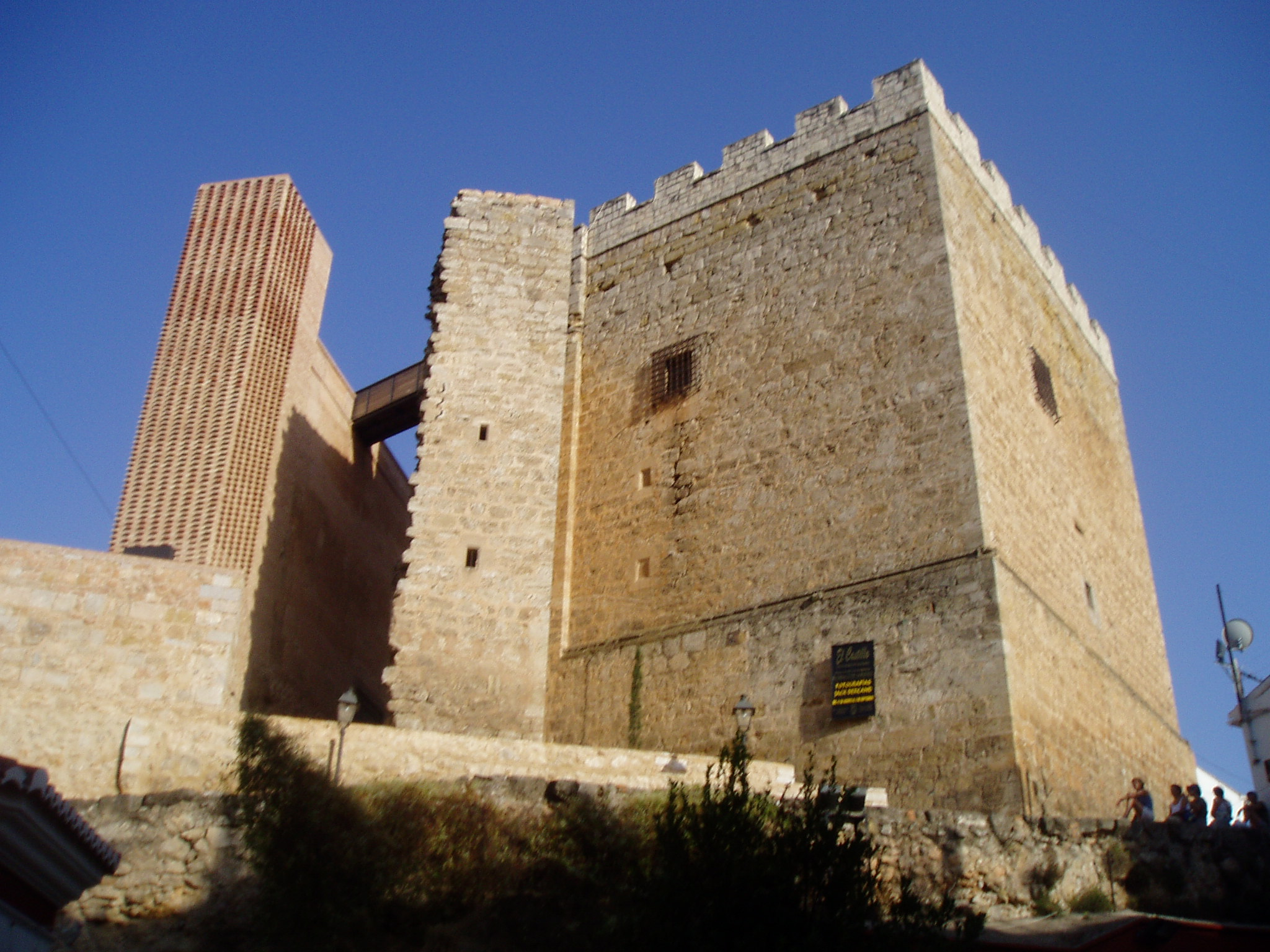
Remains of the fortifications of Requena (Torre del Homenaje)

In 1219 and 1220, the archbishop of Toledo, Rodrigo Jiménez de Rada, led two crusades against the fortified place of Requena in the Taifa of Valencia. He was accompanied both times by Sancho VII of Navarre. Although some castles were taken, Requena itself successfully resisted a siege on both occasions. Although the first expedition had papal backing, Pope Honorius III withdrew support for the second, owing to financial irregularities, preferring to devote all resources to the concurrent Fifth Crusade to the Holy Land.

== Background ==
In 1217, following the capture of Alcácer do Sal by a group of crusaders en route to the Holy Land, Count William I of Holland, one of their leaders, wrote to Pope Honorius III asking for instructions. He noted that Kings Sancho VII of Navarre and Alfonso IX of León were preparing to go to war against the Almohad Caliphate the following year. In his response dated 6 January 1218, the pope permitted some crusaders to commute their vows to go to the Holy Land into service in the Reconquista in Spain.

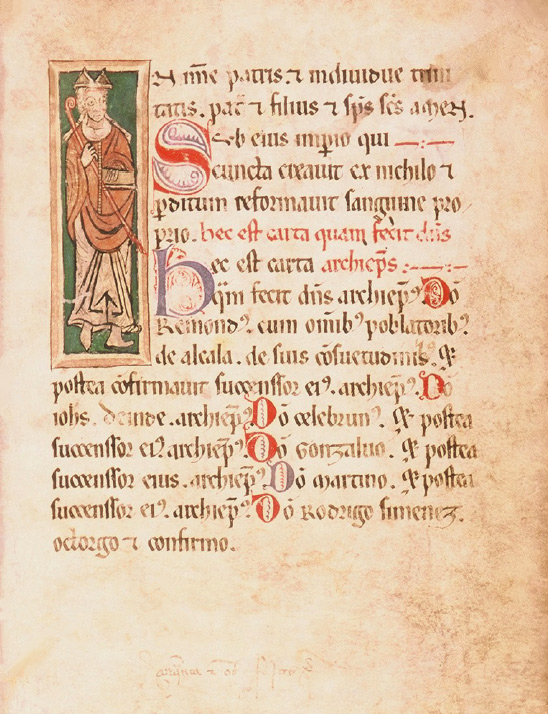
Rodrigo Jiménez de Rada, depicted in the extended charter for the University of Alcalá de Henares (c. 1235)

Honorius was probably influenced in his decision by the archbishop of Toledo, Rodrigo Jiménez de Rada, who was in Rome in the latter half of 1217. On 30 January 1218, Honorius confirmed the archbishop of Toledo as the primate of Spain and as the papal legate in charge of organizing the crusade in Spain. As legate, Rodrigo had permission to allocate vacant benefices and to absolve persons who committed violence against clergy or clergy who did not remit the twentieth of their revenue intended for the crusade. On 31 January, Honorius ordered Alfonso IX to obey Rodrigo with respect to his crusade.

Under papal pressure and through Rodrigo's mediation, León signed a peace treaty with Castile on 26 August 1218. Alfonso IX then launched his crusade unusually late in the year. He besieged Cáceres from mid-November to mid-December, but heavy rains for him to lift abandon the effort. The first crusade under Rodrigo's legateship failed.

== 1219 crusade ==
=== Preparations ===
In the aftermath of the failure at Cáceres, Rodrigo focused on securing greater funding. Pope Innocent III had, at the Fourth Lateran Council in 1215, promised to grant the same privileges for participants in the Reconquista as for crusaders. Honorius, however, had refused to allowing the twentieth intended for the Fifth Crusade to be diverted. Through a mix of bribery and persuasian, Rodrigo diverted it.

In October 1218, Honorius named Cintius and Huiguicio to collect the tax in Spain. As early as March 1218 papal, Huguicio received a canonry in Toledo and gifts in the diocese of Segovia, which Rodrigo was administering during a vacancy. The two acted together, Huguicio sending good reports of Rodrigo to Rome and collecting monies on behalf of Rodrigo by means of false representations. On 9 February 1219, Honorius, unaware of what was going on, diverted half of the twentieth from the dioceses of Toledo and Segovia to Rodrigo for "the defence of the faith and the expulsion of the Moors in Spain".

On 15 March 1219 pope offered the crusade indulgence to those taking part in or financing Rodrigo's expedition "to rip from the hands of the Muslims the land they held to the injury of the Christian name". Rodrigo was permitted to commute the Holy Land vows of Spanish crusaders if they were common soldiers—but magnates, knights, the poor and the ill were excluded. Non-Spanish crusaders were still expected to join the Holy Land crusade and leave the defence of Spain to Spaniards. In March, he also granted Rodrigo for three years a third of the tithe of Toledo, which had been destined for the construction of churches, to finance "crusaders who fight with him against the Moors".

On 18 May 1219, Honorius placed the kingdom of Navarre under papal protection so that Sancho VII, who "took the sign of the cross to set out against the Moors of Spain", could join Rodrigo's crusade. The pope left the details of this protection to Rodrigo, who was himself Navarrese. He also exempted some Navarrese churches from paying the twentieth so that they could directly support Sancho's crusade. Finally, he forbade Sancho to harm the kingdom of Aragon while crossing its territory.

=== Campaign ===
The Anales' account of the campaign

Unlike the previous year's expedition, which was in the service of León and directed against an Almohad city, Rodrigo chose in 1219 to march eastward against Requena, which lay within the Taifa of Valencia. This may have been to avoid violating the truce between Castile and the Almohads, if the Taifa of Valencia was considered to lie outside it. It was probably also intended to cut off Aragonese expansion. The Anales Toledanos primeros identifies Requena as lying in the "land of the Moors of the part of Aragon". It was perhaps even intended to limit the expansion of the diocese of Cuenca, created in 1182, in favour of Toledo. A final reason may be that Requena lay to the south of the independent Lordship of Albarracín, which had close connections to Navarre. Albarracín had previously been used by Sancho as a base for making war on the Moors in 1216.

The crusader army was large. The Anales, with gross exaggeration, numbers it at 200,000 infantry and cavalry. The Anales present Rodrigo as in command. No source expressly mentions the presence of Sancho VII, but he was almost certainly there. The army was probably composed chiefly of Castilians and Navarrese.

The crusade did not set out until the very end of summer, somewhat earlier than that of 1218. The crusaders entered enemy territory on Saint Matthew's Day (21 September). They probably marched directly south from Albarracín. In Valencian territory, they captured three castles: Santa Cruz, Serrella and Mira. They then laid siege to Requena itself using trebuchets (almajanequis) and ballistae (algarradas), according to the Anales. The siege lasted six weeks. It was lifted on Martinmas (11 November). According to the Anales, the Christians had lost 2,000 men, which, although an exaggeration, demonstrates the costliness of the enterprise. After initial successes, the crusade ended in failure.

== 1220 crusade ==
In the immediate aftermath of the failure of the 1219 expedition, Honorius III supported Rodrigo's plans for another crusade in 1220. On 4 February 1220, he granted a twentieth of the diocese of Toledo's revenues to Rodrigo for the crusade for a period of three years. He wrote to the archbishop of Tarragona, Aspàreg de la Barca, pleading that more assistance "in persons and things" be given to Rodrigo. Another campaign, he thought, might even have the effect of "diverting aid from the Saracens of the east", against whom the Fifth Crusade was still fighting. The focus on Tarragona suggests that the planned campaign was to take place in the same vicinity as that of 1219.

Soon, however, Honorius turned against Rodrigo's crusade. In April, he exempted the Cistercians from the twentieth and lifted the excommunication that had been placed on various houses by the papal collector Huguicio in connivance with Rodrigo, accusing the collectors of usurpations and abuses. On 1 July, Honorius asked the archbishop of Tarragona to investigate. On 4 July, he revoked the concession of the twentieth from five months earlier on account of Rodrigo's inactivity. Instead, since he did not want to "defraud" the crusade to the Holy Land, he indicated that the twentieth was available for one year and only for the Fifth Crusade.

Although correct about Rodrigo's abuse of the papal collection, Honorius may have been wrong about his inactivity with respect to the projected expedition. Rodrigo is said to have besieged Requena in the summer of 1220. Sancho VII of Navarre seems again to have joined the crusade, since he complained to the pope that, "having assumed the cross against the Moors", the Aragonese had plundered his kingdom in his absence. The 1220 siege also failed. The only source for the 1220 expedition is the Anales Toledanos terceros. Some historians have expressed doubt that a second siege occurred.

== Aftermath ==
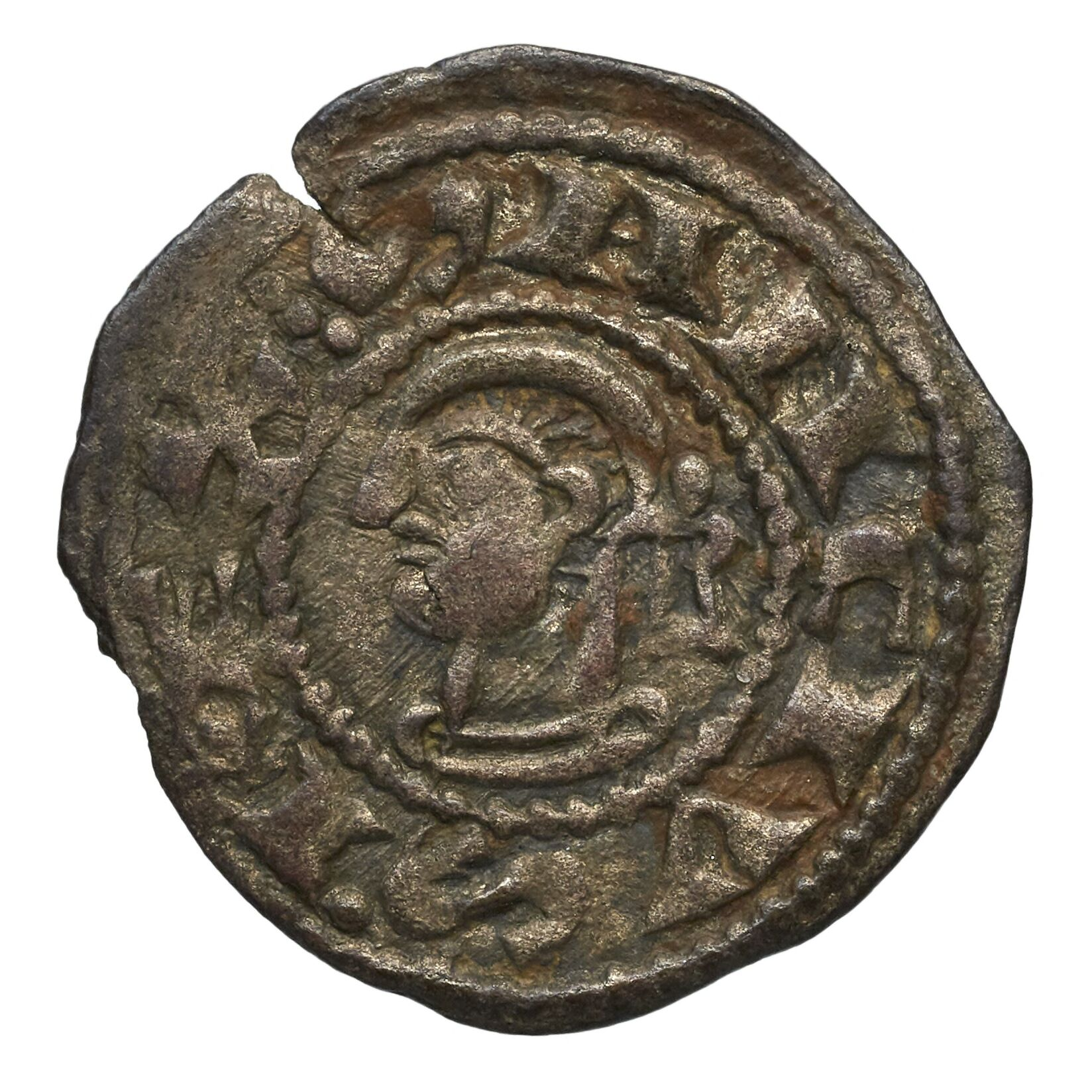
Coin of Sancho VII

The failed attempts to capture Cáceres and Requena are the first expeditions in Spanish history to be labeled cruzadas. This word appears for the first time in the pages of the Anales Toledanos primeros.

In a letter from February 1221, Honorius ordered the abbots of Fitero and Veruela and the prior of Nájera to secure compensation from the knights responsible for the incursion into Navarre the year before, identifying them as originating from the dioceses of Zaragoza, Tarazona and Calahorra. Despite these depredations, Sancho appears from his grants to have been flush with cash in the years 1219–1222, perhaps a sign of the profits of crusading.

On 30 November 1221, Rodrigo enfeoffed the three castles captured in 1219 to Gil Garcí de Azagra, his wife and his heirs "in perpetual fiefdom" in return for one mark of silver per annum. Gil, who was Rodrigo's cousin, had to do homage to the archbishop and was responsible for settling the land with taxpayers. The archbishop had the right to enter the castles and use them as a base for making war. At the same time, Gil gave Rodrigo the castles of Mora and Vallacroch and received them back in fief (without owing payments). Lucy Pick suggests that Gil took part in the 1219 expedition and had originally received Mora and Vallacroch as payment for his services.

Requena was captured by Ferdinand III of Castile in 1238.

== Sources ==
- Ayala Martínez, Carlos de (2013). "El término «cruzada» en la documentación castellana de los siglos XII y principios del XIII". Intus-Legere Historia. 7 (2): 77–93. doi:10.15691/07176864.2014.101.
- Campo Jesús, Luis del (1960). Sancho el Fuerte de Navarra. La Acción social.
- Claverie, Pierre-Vincent (2013). Honorius III et l'Orient (1216–1227): Étude et publication de sources inédites des Archives vaticanes (ASV). Brill.
- Domingo Iranzo, Eugenio (2007). "Requena: Tierra de Frontera (s. XIII)". Oleana: Cuadernos de Cultura Comarcal. 22: 215–249.
- Fortún Pérez de Ciriza, Luis Javier (1987). Sancho el Fuerte (1194–1234). Editorial Mintzoa.
- Fortún Pérez de Ciriza, Luis Javier (2022). "Sancho VII". Diccionario Biográfico Español. Real Academia de la Historia.
- Gómez, Miguel (2018). "Archbishop Rodrigo, Honorius III, and the Fifth Crusade in Spain". In Jessalynn L. Bird; Damian J. Smith (eds.). The Fourth Lateran Council and the Crusade Movement: The Impact of the Council of 1215 on Latin Christendom and the East. Brepols. pp. 193–215.
- Goñi Gaztambide, José (1983). Navarra y las cruzadas (3rd ed.). Diputación Foral de Navarra.
- Linehan, Peter (1971). The Spanish Church and the Papacy in the Thirteenth Century. Cambridge University Press.
- Lomax, Derek W. (1978). The Reconquest of Spain. Longman.
- O'Callaghan, Joseph F. (2003). Reconquest and Crusade in Medieval Spain. University of Pennsylvania Press.
- Pick, Lucy K. (2004). Conflict and Coexistence: Archbishop Rodrigo and the Muslims and Jews of Medieval Spain. University of Michigan Press.
- Piqueras Mas, Francisco (2007). "Los tres castillos de la cruzada contra Requena (1219)". Oleana: Cuadernos de Cultura Comarcal. 22: 103–120.
- Rodríguez López, Ana (1994). La consolidación territorial de la monarquía feudal castellana: Expansión y fronteras durante el reinado de Fernando III. Consejo Superior de Investigaciones Científicas.
- Villegas-Aristizábal, Lucas (2018). "Did Savary of Mauléon Participate in Alfonso IX's Failed Siege of Cáceres in 1218?". De Medio Aevo. 6 (12): 99–118.
