= Luso-Leonese War (1219–1223) =

Portuguese–Castilian war of 1219–1223
Date	1219–1223
Location	Galicia and Portugal
Result	Peace Treaty

Belligerents
Kingdom of Portugal	Kingdom of León

Commanders and leaders
Afonso II of Portugal; Sancho II of Portugal	Alfonso IX of León; Martim Sanches

The Luso-Leonese War of 1219 to 1223 was an armed conflict that took place in the Iberian Peninsula between Portugal and the Kingdom of Leon, during the reigns of kings Afonso II of Portugal and Alfonso IX of León respectively.

== History ==
King Afonso II had been engaged in quarrels with the Portuguese clergy since 1218 because he sought reinforce or recover royal privileges at the expense of the Church. He had the support of a party of men who opposed the power of the bishops, which included the royal secretary Gonçalo Mendes and the royal majordomo. The king litigated particularly against the Bishops of Lisbon, Coimbra and the powerful Archbishop of Braga Estevão Soares da Silva, a close affiliate of the royal bastard Martim Sanches de Portugal, who was the half-brother of Afonso II and at the same time liutenant of king Alfonso IX of León in the frontier regions of Limia, Turonio, Ledesma, Montenegro, Ribadavia, Sarria and Baronceli in Galicia, on the border with Portugal.

In 1219, Afonso II revoked a number of concessions to the Church, which provoked an outburst from the Archbishop. He denounced the king for having ecclesiastics tried in civil-courts and contribute to the anudúva, or labour on the watchtowers of the frontier, and accused him of adultery. Threats from the king and his close supporters did not silence the archbishop and he had them excommunicated and the kingdom placed under an interdict. Still that year, King Alfonso IX confirmed to the Archbishop of Braga the town of Ervededo, in Limia, Galicia. Afonso II may have seen this as the visible tip of a secret alliance between the Archbishop and the king of León. Shortly afterwards, some men-at-arms from Guimarães, where king Afonso II was at the time, plundered Ervededo, while lieutenant Martim Sanches was out of the region with his troops. The Archbishop then fled to León.

After the Portuguese "raid" on Ervededo, lieutenant Martim Sanches twice demanded from King Afonso II reparations and the restitution of the plundered goods but he was given no reply. As such, he invaded northern Portugal in 1220 ahead of a detachment of troops. King Afonso II had moved to Coimbra in the meantime, but he returned to Guimarães when he learnt that Martim Sanches had entered Portugal and was heading to Ponte de Lima. The king gathered troops from the regions of Guimarães, Entre-Douro-e-Minho and Aquém-Douro and departed north, to face his half-brother in battle.

Afonso II fell ill as he approached Ponte de Lima however, and he withdrew first to Santo Tirso and abandoned the campaign, leaving his host under the command of Mem Gonçalves de Sousa, João Pires da Maia and Gil Vasques de Soverosa, step-father of Martim Sanches. They camped near the monastery of Várzea de Cima de Cadavo, one league from Barcelos. Tradition had it that Martim Sanches hesitated in attacking the king, so he requested that the royal banner be moved to a distance of a league and Afonso II complied.

At Várzea, the Portuguese were routed by the Leonese and Galicians after a brief battle and put to flight toward Braga. Gil Vasques commanded the rearguard and was captured by Martim Sanches himself, who let him go free after disarming him. At Congostas de Braga, the Portuguese were once again routed and forced behind the walls of Braga. The Galicians and Leonese then sacked the suburbs. They proceeded to Guimarães, and near this city the Portuguese were routed once again and forced to find refuge within the city walls. After a day spent on the battlefield and the battle confirmed clearly as won, Martim Sanches returned to Galicia laden with spoils and prisoners, whom he set free. He would go on to fight the Muslims and win the battle of Tejada.

Embassies were sent to León and King Afonso IX condemned Martin Sanches’s incursion. It had been made without his consent and he would not have authorized it. Hostilities between Portugal and León, however, did not end there.

Afonso II meanwhile, had been in Santarém since January 1221, a city from which he would not leave until his death two years later. The king was likely already ill by that point, far removed from government affairs and in November of that year he wrote his last will and testament.

In 1222, Alfonso IX of León personally invaded Portugal and captured the city of Chaves. Afonso II died in 1223 and was succeeded by Sancho II, who negotiated a peace treaty.

== See also ==
- Portugal in the Middle Ages
- Military history of Portugal
  - Portugal in the Reconquista
- Castle of Braga
