= Savari de Mauléon =

French soldier

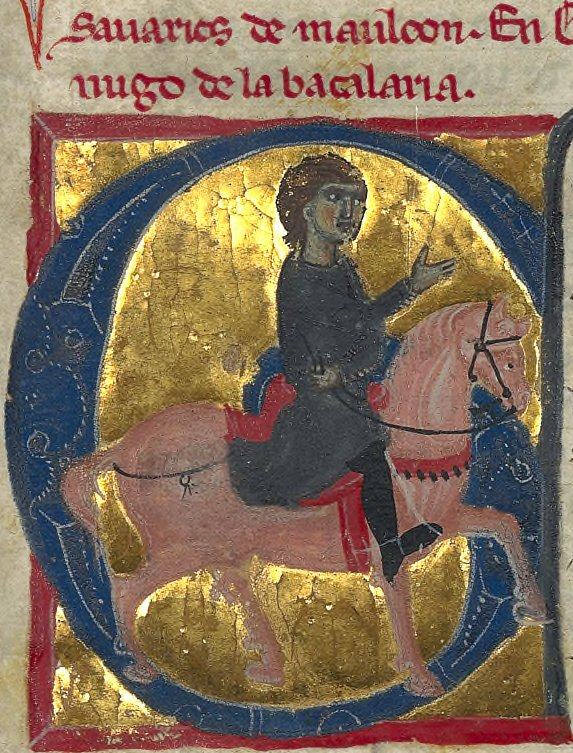
- Savari, from a 13th-century manuscript

Personal details
- Born: c. 1181 Mauléon, County of Poitou, Angevin Empire
- Died: 29 July 1233
- Known for: Angevin (English) seneschal of Poitou; Named to Regency Council of Henry III; Capetian (French) seneschal of Saintonge

Savari de Mauléon (also Savaury) (Occitan: Savaric de Malleo) (died 1236) was a French soldier, the son of Raoul de Mauléon, Viscount of Thouars and Lord of Mauléon.

Having espoused the cause of Arthur I, Duke of Brittany, he was captured at Mirebeau (1202), and imprisoned in Corfe Castle although he is reputed to have escaped by making his jailers drunk and overpowering them. John, King of England, set him at liberty in 1204, gained him to his side and named him Seneschal of Poitou (1205).

In 1211, Savari de Mauléon assisted Raymond VI, Count of Toulouse, and with him besieged Simon de Montfort, 5th Earl of Leicester in Castelnaudary. Philip II of France bought his services in 1212 and gave him command of a fleet which was destroyed in the Flemish port of Damme. Then Mauléon returned to King John, whom he aided in the First Barons' War (1215–1217).

He was one of those whom John designated on his deathbed for a council of regency to govern the Kingdom of England in the name of new king Henry III (1216).

In the late Autumn of 1218, Savari probably helped Alfonso IX of León in his ill-fated attempt to capture the Almohad-controlled city of Cáceres.

Savari then went to Egypt on the Fifth Crusade (1219), and was present at the taking of Damietta. Upon returning to Poitou, he became a seneschal for Henry III for the second time. He defended Saintonge against Louis VIII in 1224, but was accused of having given La Rochelle up to the king of France, and the suspicions of the English again threw him back upon the French. Louis VIII then turned over to him the defence of La Rochelle and the coast of Saintonge.

In 1227, Savari took part in the rising of the barons of Poitiers and Anjou against the young Louis IX. He enjoyed a certain reputation for his poems in the Langue d'oc.
