= Anales toledanos =

Series of three Castilian chronologies of the 13th century

Last page of the Anales I, recording the crusade against Requena

The Anales toledanos (Annals of Toledo) are a series of three Old Spanish annals covering the medieval history of the Kingdom of Toledo: the primeros (I) begin with the County of Castile and carry their history forward to 1219, the segundos (II) end in 1250, and the terceros (III) in 1303 (or 1391). They are a valuable source to the historian. None of the Anales toledanos are related save in their provenance in Toledo and their emphasis on events in the centre of the Iberian Peninsula.

The Anales toledanos primeros relied on the Anales castellanos segundos as a source, and are principally a vernacular translation and continuation (from 1110 to 1129) of these. Also used as a source was the Crónica Cauriense. The Anales toledanos segundos were probably the work of a Morisco, for they show especial interest in Andalusian Muslim affairs, their vocabulary is unusual, and major Christian victories are not mentioned. They reckon time according to the Anno Hegirae, not the Spanish Era, as the primeros and terceros do.

The first two annals were edited and published by Francisco de Berganza in his Antigüedades de España (1719–21), and were re-edited, with serious chronological alterations, by Enrique Flórez, who also published the third.

== Editions ==
- In Enrique Flórez, ed. España Sagrada, XXIII (Madrid: 1767), 381–300 (I), 401–9 (II), 410–23 (III).
- In Ambrosio Huici y Miranda, ed. Las crónicas latinas de la Reconquista, I (Valencia: 1913).
- In Antonio Floriano, ed. "Anales toledanos III", Cuadernos de historia de España, 43–44 (1967), 154–87.
- In Julio Porres Martín-Cleto, ed. Los Anales Toledanos I y II (Toledo: 1993).
