= Rodrigo Jiménez de Rada =

Navarrese-born Castilian Roman Catholic bishop and historian

- Archbishop of Toledo
- Archdiocese: Toledo
- Appointed: Pope Innocent III
- In office: 1209–1247
- Predecessor: Martín II López de Pisuerga
- Successor: Juan III Medina de Pomar

Personal details
- Born: c. 1170 Puente la Reina, Kingdom of Navarre
- Died: 10 June 1247 close to Lyon
- Buried: Verdun Cathedral
- Education: University of Bologna, University of Paris

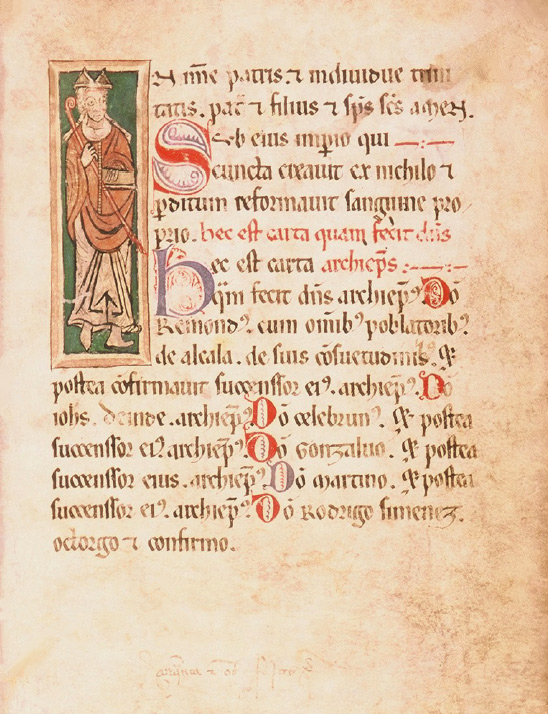
Fuero Viejo extendido de Alcalá de Henares (Rodrigo Jiménez de Rada, 1235).

Rodrigo Jiménez (or Ximénez) de Rada (c. 1170 – 10 June 1247) (Note: Also mentioned as 'Archbishop Don Roderic of Toledo') was a Roman Catholic bishop and historian, who held an important religious and political role in the Kingdom of Castile during the reigns of Alfonso VIII and Ferdinand III, a period in which the Castilian monarchy consolidated its political hegemony over the rest of polities in the Iberian Peninsula. He was at the helm of the Archdiocese of Toledo from 1208 to 1247. He authored De rebus Hispaniae, a history of the Iberian Peninsula.

== Biography ==
Rodrigo Jiménez de Rada was born in c. 1170 in Puente la Reina, Kingdom of Navarre. He was born from a Navarrese noble family and was educated by his uncle, Martín de la Finojosa, abbot of Saint Mary of Huerta and bishop of Sigüenza. He studied Law and Theology in the Universities of Bologna and Paris. When he returned to Navarre he mediated between that kingdom and Castile and he became friend of King Alfonso VIII of Castile, who nominated him as bishop of Osma and later put pressure on the chapter of Toledo to elect him as archbishop of Toledo. His election as archbishop of Toledo was confirmed by Pope Innocent III on 12 February 1209. In addition, Alfonso VIII appointed him as major chancellor of Castile.

He played a key role in the war against the Almohads and at the battle of Las Navas de Tolosa (1212). He was the moral leader of that war, which was considered in Europe as a crusade in which many European knights took part. He sent afterwards missionaries to Morocco. His archbishopric gained a lot of possessions throughout the Guadalquivir valley, especially around Quesada and received further generous donations from kings and lords.

As archbishop of Toledo, he promoted the building of the cathedral and placed the first stone in 1226 (it was not completed until 1493), restored the dioceses of Baeza and Córdoba after the Christian conquest of those cities and defended the primacy of his see in Spain against the pretensions of Braga and Santiago.

He promoted the cultural life of Toledo, a city that was the cultural entrepôt of Christian and Muslim civilizations during the Middle Ages. He ordered the translation of the Koran to Latin. He also composed a wide historiographic work. His De rebus Hispaniae, a general history of Spain, was very soon translated into Spanish and was very influential on the General History of Alfonso X.

He died near Lyon while returning from a visit to the pope, and is interred in the monastery of Saint Mary of Huerta.

== Writings ==
- De rebus Hispaniae
- Hunnorum, Vandalorum et Silingorum Historia
- Ostrogothorum Historia
- Historia Romanorum
- Historia Arabum - The 'Historia Arabum', which, in English, translates as 'The History of the Arabs', was written by Jiménez de Rada between 1243 and 1245. The work can be divided into two key sections: in the first instance, a biography of the prophet Muhammad; secondly, a detailed political history of the Arabs in the aftermath of Muhammad's death, centred especially on the Iberian Peninsula. The Historia Arabum has been interpreted variously by historians as a polemical attack on Islam and its adherents within Spain in particular, an attempt to elucidate the origins of Islam and the deeds of Arabs for Jiménez de Rada's patron (Fernando III), and a historical guide through which Fernando III could incorporate newly-conquered Muslim populations into Castile.

== See also ==
- Crusade against Requena

== Bibliography ==
- Gorosterratzu, Javier: D. Rodrigo Jiménez de Rada. Gran estadista, escritor y prelado, Pamplona: Imprenta Vda. de T. Bescansa, 1925
- Roderici Ximenii de Rada opera omnia (ed. by Juan Fernández Valerde), Turnhout: Brepols, 1992–1993
- Adro, Xavier: Rodrigo Jiménez de Rada. Estadista y artífice, siglo XIII, Barcelona: Casals, 1989
- Pérez de Rada, Francisco Javier: El arzobispo don Rodrigo Jiménez de Rada, Madrid: Fundación Jaureguízar, 2002
- Pick, Lucy: Conflict and coexistence. Archbishop Rodrigo and the Muslims and Jews of Medieval Spain, Ann Arbor: University of Michigan, 2004
