= Crusade indulgence =

Forgiveness of sin in return for support for Christian Holy War

In the history of the Catholic Church, a crusade indulgence was any indulgence—remission from the penalties imposed by penance—granted to a person who participated in an ecclesiastically sanctioned crusade. It had its origins in the Council of Clermont that closed on 27 November 1095. According to Lambert of Arras, who was present, the council decreed that, "Whoever for devotion alone, not to gain honour or money, goes to Jerusalem to liberate the Church of God can substitute this journey for all penance." This marked the start of the First Crusade. Later popes and councils often invoked "the same remission as instituted by Pope Urban at the council at Clermont." The connection to the liberation of Jerusalem was later weakened and the same or similar indulgence offered to participants in the Northern Crusades and the Albigensian Crusade.

== See also ==
- Crusade bull

== Bibliography ==
- Andrea, Alfred J. (2003). "Indulgence, Crusade". Encyclopedia of the Crusades. Greenwood Press. pp. 165–166. ISBN 0313316597.
- Bird, Jessalynn (2006). "Indulgences and Penance". In Alan V. Murray (ed.). The Crusades: An Encyclopedia. Vol. 2: D–J. ABC-CLIO. pp. 633–637.
- Bysted, Ane L. (2014). The Crusade Indulgence: Spiritual Rewards and the Theology of the Crusades, c. 1095–1216. Brill.
- Chevedden, Paul E. (2005). "Canon 2 of the Council of Clermont (1095) and the Crusade Indulgence". Annuarium historiae conciliorum. 37 (2): 253–322.
