= Guillaume II Amanieu de Genève =

Roman Catholic archbishop

Arms of Guillaume II Amanieu de Genève (d.1227): Quarterly 1st and 4th: Gules, a chevron or; 2nd and 3rd: Azure, a crescent argent.

Guillaume II Amanieu de Genève (Guillaume de Gebennis; died 13 September 1227), Archbishop of Bordeaux (1207–1227) and Seneschal of Gascony (1217–1218) was a 13th-century French noble.

== Biography ==
Considered to be descended from the Geniès family, Guillaume was elected in 1207 to the position of Archbishop of Bordeaux. The archbishop and primate of Bourges complained to King Philip II of France, in 1210 about the refusal of Guillaume to accept the jurisdiction of primacy of the Archbishop of Bourges, over the Archbishop of Bordeaux. The matter was raised with Pope Innocent III, who directed action against Guillaume. Guillame was involved in the Reconquista of 1212 with King Alfonso VIII of Castile. In 1217, he was appointed to the office of Seneschal of Gascony, by King Henry III of England, serving until 1218. Guillaume is known to have been in Acre, in the Holy Land in October 1221, as part of the Fifth Crusade and in 1223 at Damietta, Egypt. Travelling to Rome in 1225, he had returned to Angoulême by July 1227. Guillaume were involved in the Albigensian Crusade in 1227, before his death on 13 September 1227.
