= Nuño Pérez de Lara =

Castilian nobleman (died 1177)

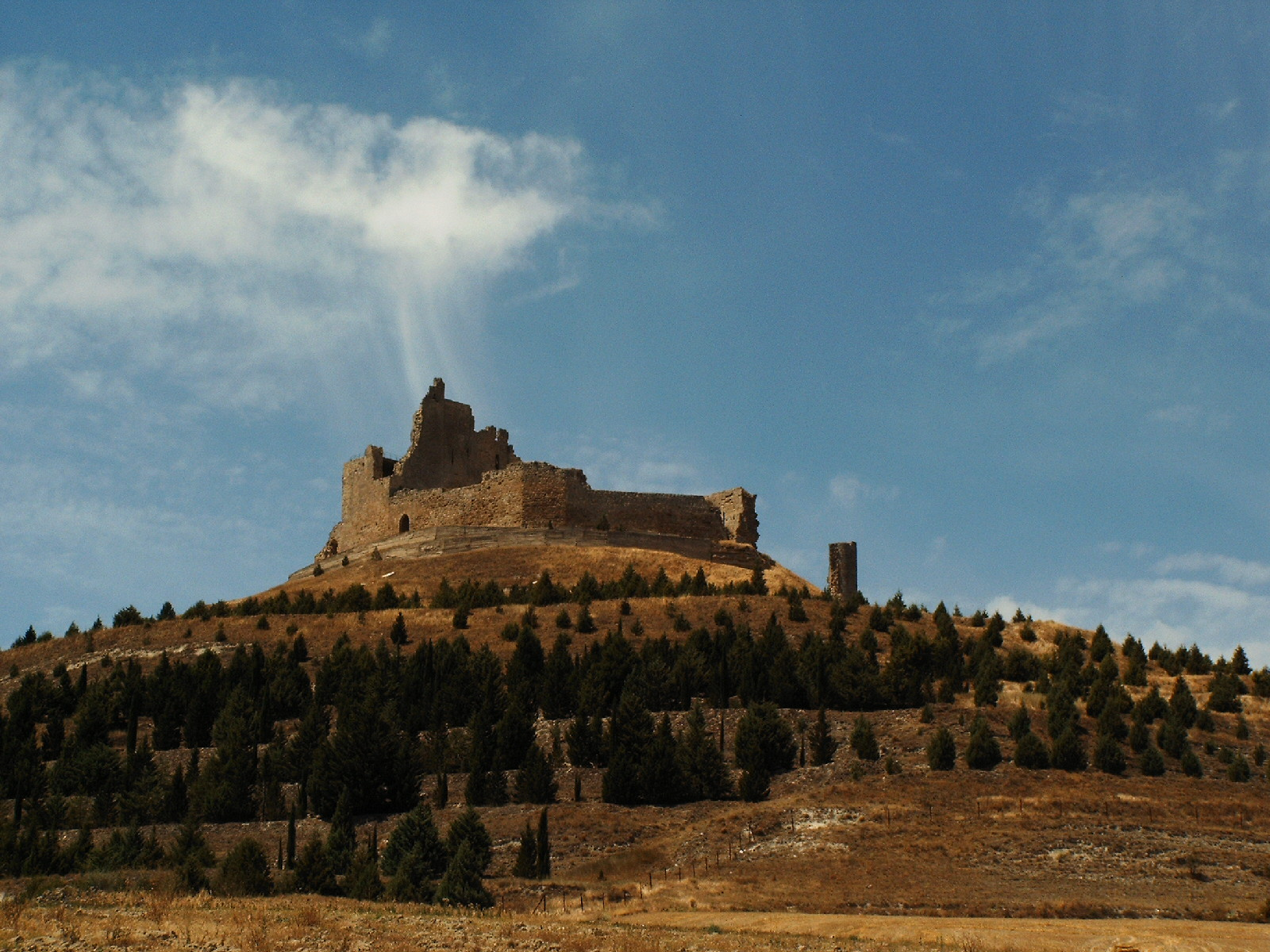
The ruins of the castle of Castrojeriz, which Nuño governed in 1173–77

Nuño Pérez de Lara (died 3 August 1177) was a Castilian nobleman, politician and military leader. He began his career at the court of the Emperor Alfonso VII, during whose reign he took part in the repoblación of the Extremadura and the defence of the Almohad frontier. Between 1164 and 1169 he governed Castile as regent for the underage Alfonso VIII, and he continued to exercise semi-regal power in the kingdom until 1176. He founded two monasteries and fostered the cult of Thomas Becket in Spain. He died taking part in the conquest of Cuenca

== Family ==
Nuño was the third of four sons of Pedro González de Lara and his wife Ava, probably from northern France. His elder brothers were Álvaro and Manrique and he had a younger brother named Rodrigo. Sometime before March 1154 Nuño married Teresa Fernández, an illegitimate daughter of Fernando Pérez de Traba and Theresa, Countess of Portugal. Together they were the parents of Fernando, Álvaro, Gonzalo II, Sancha (wife of Sancho, Count of Provence), María (abbess of Perales) and countess Elvira, perhaps wife of Ermengol VIII, Count of Urgell.

== Early public career ==
In February 1141 Nuño entered public life, subscribing a charter of the monastery of San Pedro de Arlanza. In March 1145 he was appointed imperial alférez, a post he held until February 1155, an unusually long term for an office that was typically held by younger noblemen early in their careers. In 1146 he held the tenencia of Aguilar de Campoo, his first recorded fief. He held an interest in some houses in the important city of Toledo, which he granted to Gonzalo de Marañón in November 1148. There exists a charter dated 1 July 1152 which claims to be a fuero conceded by Nuño with the consent of the king to the city of Castro Benavente, now Castronuño, but it is probably a forgery. The attached list of witnesses indicates that it cannot pre-date 1156, although the re-settlement of the town had occurred as early as 1154. It had been directed by Nuño with the assistance of bishop Navarro of Salamanca and his archdeacon Cipriano. The ecclesiastics took the lead in the construction of new churches and the provision of liturgical books and vestments, while Nuño oversaw the repopulation of the village. Between February and December 1154 Nuño received the frontier tenencia of Montoro.

As alférez Nuño was used to spending his time at court and governing his fief in absentia, but when Montoro came under Almohad attack in the spring of 1156 he was called to defend it. He was unsuccessful. The fortress fell and he was probably captured. He was not ransomed and returned to court until January 1157. With the loss of Montoro he was transferred to the tenencia of Avia (perhaps Abia de las Torres), which he continued to govern until his death. In March 1156 Alfonso VII granted Nuño the vill of Alcabón and in 1158 Nuño exchanged his lands at Castronuño with the Hospitallers for theirs at Torre de Herrín. In 1158 Alfonso granted Nuño the tenencia of Villagarcía, and in 1160 those of Cabezón (until 1173), Covillas (briefly), and Herrera (until his death). In 1160 Nuño and his brothers fought a battle at Lobregal with the rival Castros, whom they had earlier that year exiled from the kingdom. They were defeated and Nuño was captured by Fernando Rodríguez de Castro. By March 1162 Nuño had been granted the title comes (count), probably by his brother Manrique, who was regent at the time for the young king, Alfonso VIII. That same year Nuño was made guardian (or tutor) of the king, a responsibility he received against in 1172 and 1173, and was rewarded with the tenencias of Dueñas (until 1175) and Moratinos.

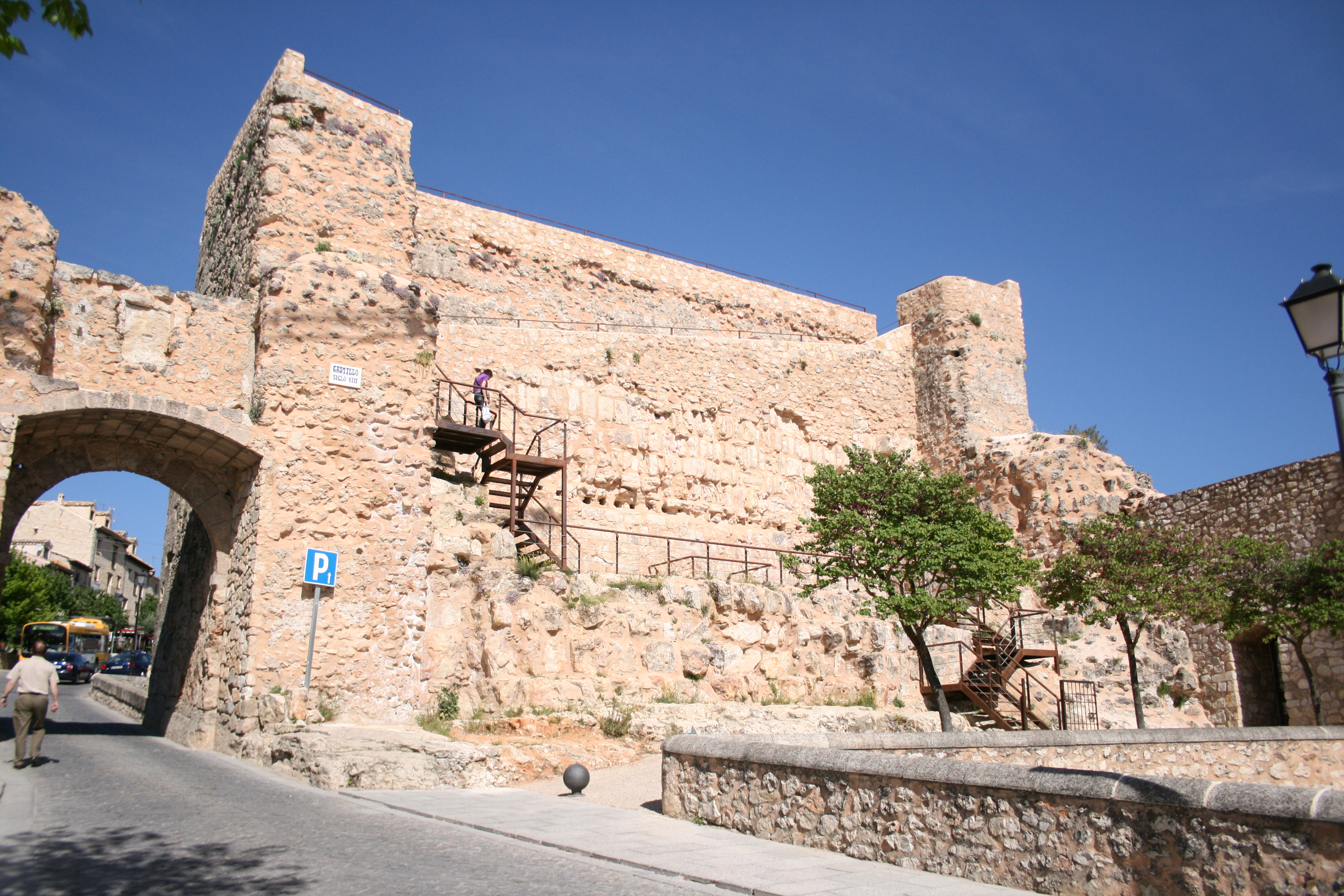
Ruins of the castle of Cuenca, where Nuño was killed

== Regency of Castile and later years ==
When Manrique died in 1164, Nuño succeeded him as regent of Castile. In 1165 he began governing the tenencias of Carrión (until 1176, or his death) and Villafáfila. In March 1168 Alfonso VIII put the town of Chillón and its mercury mine under the joint control of Nuño and the Order of Calatrava. On 11 November 1169 Alfonso came of age, yet Nuño continued "dwelling on the affairs of the kingdom" (manente super negotia regni) as late as 31 October 1176. In 1170 the king gave Nuño charge of Villavaquerín, transferring him to that of San Román (1171) and then Cuenca de Campos (1172–76) and Tamariz (1172). In 1173 Nuño was governing the tenencias of Amaya, Castrojeriz, Saldaña, and Tariego. In May 1174 Nuño exchanged an estate belonging to a certain Don Sarracín with the monastery of Arlanza for the vill of Huérmeces. That same year a certain Bernard secured his simoniacal election as Bishop of Osma by paying Nuño and Pedro de Arazuri 5,000 maravedíes. In 1176 Nuño received some houses in Toledo that had once belonged to Sancha Raimúndez from the archbishop, Cerebruno, for an annual rent of five maravedíes. They also gave some houses they owned near the imperial palace to the archbishop.

In 1176 Nuño Pérez de Lara was appointed governor of the tenencias of Nájera, Ubierna, and Valeria. One year later, in July 1177, he was present at the Conquest of Cuenca. He was killed in action a few weeks later on the 3rd of August. His widow fled to the Leonese court and there married King Ferdinand II.

== Religious patronage ==
On 29 January 1160 Nuño and his wife founded the Cistercian convent of Santa María at Perales, with lands also in Zorita. In 1169 Nuño, his brother Álvaro, and Gonzalo and Sancha Osorio renounced their rights over the monastery of Aguilar de Campoo, a daughter house of that of Retuerta, and established some Augustinians there. They provoked controversy by expelling the monks of Retuerta's other nearby daughter house at Herrera de Pisuerga and transferring its properties to Aguilar, engendering a dispute that was only resolved in 1173. Aguilar adopted the Praemonstratensian rule and rapidly became the most important Praemonstratensian monastery in the peninsula and patronised by the king. Nuño was especially generous to the cathedrals of the realm, endowing those of Santa María de León (1170), Santa María de Burgos (1174), and Santa María de Toledo. At the last they founded a chapel dedicated to Thomas Becket in 1174 and endowed it further in 1177 with the village of Alcabón, some houses in Toledo, twenty cows, and one hundred sheep. Nuño have specifically intended to promote the cult of Thomas in Spain. In 1172 he made a grant of half the village of Aceca to the Order of Calatrava. Sometime before 1174 Nuño and his wife founded a hospital beside the Cistercian monastery of Saint Nicholas in Itero del Castillo for travellers on the Way of Saint James crossing the Pisuerga by the bridge (puente de Itero) there.

== Works cited ==
- Barton, Simon. The Aristocracy in Twelfth-century León and Castile. Cambridge: Cambridge University Press, 1997.
- Fletcher, Richard A. The Episcopate in the Kingdom of León in the Twelfth Century. Oxford: Oxford University Press, 1978.
- Reilly, Bernard F. The Kingdom of León-Castilla under King Alfonso VII, 1126–1157. Philadelphia: University of Pennsylvania Press, 1998.
- Rodríguez-Picavea Matilla, Enrique. "La Orden de Calatrava en la meseta meridional castellana: encomiendas y distrubución geográfica de las propiedades (1158–1212)." Hispania, 51:179 (1991), 875–899.
- Sánchez de Mora, Antonio. La Nobleza Castella en la Plena Edad Media: El Linaje de Lara (ss. XI-XIII). Doctoral Thesis, Universidad de Sevilla, 2003.
- Yáñez Neira, María Damián. "El monasterio cisterciense de Perales, cuna de la recolección." Publicaciones de la Institución Tello Téllez de Meneses, 59 (1988), 387–414.
