= Fernando Núñez de Lara =

Spanish noble (fl. 1173–1219)

Fernando Núñez de Lara (fl. 1173–1219) was a count of the House of Lara. He spent most of career in the service of the Kingdom of Castile, but at times served the neighbouring Kingdom of León as well. He was a courtier late in the reign of Alfonso VIII (1158–1214), whom he served as alférez, the highest military post in the kingdom, in 1187–1188 and 1201–1205. Fernando also fought, with his brothers Álvaro and Gonzalo, at the Battle of Las Navas de Tolosa in 1212.

== Family ==
Fernando was the son of Nuño Pérez de Lara and Teresa Fernández de Traba, who after Nuño's death in 1177 married King Ferdinand II of León, taking her children from her first marriage to live at the court. Sometime before 1202 he married Mayor.

Fernando and Mayor had four children: Fernando (d. before June 1232); Álvaro (d. 1240), who married Infanta María Alfonso, illegitimate daughter of Alfonso IX of León and Teresa Gil de Soverosa, and by an unknown mistress fathered Teresa Álvarez, wife of Diego López de Salcedo; Sancha, wife of Ferdinand, a younger son of Afonso II of Portugal; and, Teresa, who married Count Ponç IV of Empúries.

== Fiefs and lands ==
The breadth of Fernando's power and influence is an apparent in a lists of territories he is known to have governed. Between 1173 and 1190 Fernando held the tenencias of Aguilar de Campoo (1173–90), Herrera (1173–88), Amaya (1175–90), Carrión (1175–90), and Avia (1176–88). Later he held those of Ubierna (1181–90), Tamariz (1181–95), Ordejón (1182–86), and Saldaña (1183–90). Among the tenencias that he appear to have held only for brief periods were Asturias de Santillana (1173), Liébana (1178), Monzón (1179), Cuenca de Campos (1181), Villaescusa (1183), Moratinos (1184), Toroño (1192–94), Asturias de Tineo (1193), Astudillo (1196), and Medina del Campo (1210). The large region of Asturias de Oviedo, once the heartland of the kingdom, was held by Fernando on three separate occasions (1191, 1192–93, 1200), and that of Bureba, a Castilian district fronting Navarre, twice (1187–90, 1202), his rule there being interrupted by Diego López II de Haro.

There is evidence that Fernando sought to consolidate his lands in the region around Burgos, the capital of Castile. His daughters sold important estates in and around Burgos to the Diocese of Burgos during the 1240s, and his wife made a donation to the Cathedral of Burgos. Later, his son Álvaro donated the church of Boadilla del Camino in the Burgos region to the Diocese of Palencia.

On 22 January 1189 Fernando was the recipient of royal largesse for his faithful service, receiving estates at Huerta and Carabanchel from Alfonso VIII. His career after this date was marked less by faithfulness than by opportunism, and he frequently shifted allegiance between the Castilian court and the Leonese. Between 15 January 1191 and 17 July 1194 he is traceable at the court of Alfonso IX of León, and then again from 24 June 1199 to 6 January 1200. On 8 December 1199 Alfonso IX granted his new wife, Berenguela of Castile, as part of her arras a number of castles to be held by Fernando as her vassal. While the total number of royal castles thus given away was thirty, those to be kept by Fernando were located in the Asturias: Aguilar, Gozón, Ventosa, Buanga, Oviedo, Santa Cruz de Tineo, and Tudela. Fernando's future stays at the Leonese court were more brief, in 1208, 1217, and 1219.

== Relationship with the Church ==
Fernando favoured the Benedictine house of San Salvador de Oña with a donation in 1183 and the Praemonstratensian monastery at Aguilar de Campóo in 1205. His other relations with the Church were more economic in nature, and often disputes. In 1208 he came to an agreement with the monastery of Sobrado in a property dispute. In 1215 he made an exchange of properties with the diocese of Palencia. In July 1216 he sold an estate at Berlanga de Duero to the convent of Santa María la Real de Las Huelgas in Burgos for 1,000 maravedís, and at the same time was involved in a legal dispute with the prior of San Juan de Burgos in the same city. Fernando also made donations to the military orders. The Order of Calatrava, a native Castilian order, received one in 1182 and in 1193 the Hospitallers also. He had had previously, on 8 August 1183, exchanged properties with the latter. In 1203 he made a grant to the Leonese Order of Santiago, with which previously, probably between 1184 and 1186, he had been involved in a series of lawsuits over property at Villalón.

Fernando is last mentioned on 28 April 1219. For reasons unknown, he went into exile in Africa and died at Marrakesh after being received into the Hospitaller Order on his deathbed. His body was brought back for burial at the Hospitallers' hospital founded by his parents in Puente Itero. His widow was alive as late as 1232.
