= Gonzalo Núñez de Lara y Traba =

Gonzalo Núñez II de Lara (c. 1165 – after 1230), son of Count Nuño Pérez de Lara and Teresa Fernández de Traba, was a high ranking noble (ricohombre) and prominent member of the powerful House of Lara, one of the principals of the kingdoms of León and of Castile. Unlike his older brothers, Fernando and Álvaro, with whom he was in the Battle of Las Navas de Tolosa, most of his life was spent in the kingdom of León.

Coat-of-arms of the House of Lara.

== Family origins ==
He would have been born in the second decade in the second half of the 12th century, since he appears at the beginning of 1180 for the first time, confirming royal diplomas from his stepfather King Fernando II. He was the third son of Count Nuño Pérez de Lara who died in the capture of Cuenca in 1177 and paternal grandson of Pedro González de Lara and Countess Ava. Gonzalo, therefore, was the great-grandson of his namesake Gonzalo Núñez I de Lara and his wife Goto Núñez.

His mother Teresa Fernández de Traba, was the out-of-wedlock daughter of Count Fernando Pérez de Trava, of the powerful Galician house of Traba, and Teresa Alfonso, illegitimate daughter of King Alfonso VI of León and Jimena Muñoz. Before maintaining a relationship with the Galician count, Teresa Alfonso had married Count Henry, Count of Portugal and was the mother of the first king of Portugal, Alfonso Énríquez. After being widowed by Nuño Pérez de Lara, Teresa Fernández de Traba was the lover and later the second wife of King Fernando II of León. For this reason, the King of Leon was the stepfather of the children from Teresa's first marriage, the counts Fernando, Álvaro, Gonzalo Núñez de Lara and their sisters, who grew up in the Leonese court.

His older brother, Count Fernando, was ensign of King Alfonso VIII of Castille and alférez in Asturias de Santillana, Aguilar, and Herrera during his father's lifetime; on his father's death, the king entrusted him with the government of Ubierna, Old Castile, La Bureba and Cuenca. He confronted King Ferdinand III of Castile and took refuge in Marrakesh where he died in 1220. The other brother, Álvaro, also a count, was a royal alférez, tutor to Enrique I of Castile and one of the most powerful magnates of his time.

== Biography ==
He was more closely linked to the kingdom of León and to the Galician lands, where his maternal relatives from the house of Traba were. He exercised the government of several holdings, Alba de Tormes from 1180 and later, between 1195 and 1211 during various periods, the squares of Sarria, Montenegro, Asturias, Lemos, Trastámara, Limia and Monterroso, as well as that of Aguilar de Campoo from 1196.

Relations between the Laras and Alfonso IX cooled down when the king appointed Pedro Fernández de Castro as his mayordomo and the latter convinced the king to ally with the Almohads against the kingdom of Castile, which led to the excommunication of both for Pope Celestine III who urged Christians to rebel and freed them from all obedience and fidelity to their king. The Lara brothers remained faithful to King Alfonso VIII of Castile and Gonzalo, from his possession of Aguilar de Campó he defended the area of alto Pisuerga. Several Leonese magnates as a result of what happened, went to the court of the Castilian king. In April 1197, the King of Leon and his butler organized another incursion into Castilian lands with the support of the Almohads, but the Castilian-Aragonese troops confronted him, although later the two Christian kingdoms reached an agreement and the Castilians signed peace with the Almohads.

Gonzalo returned to León and by September 1197 he was already ruling the tenure of Asturias, possibly because many Asturian squares were handed over by Alfonso IX to Queen Berenguela of Castile in earnest and the queen could have ceded the government to her Castilian vassals since Gonzalo appears in the documentation in those years as tenente arras regine de Asturiis.

He participated with his brothers in the Battle of Las Navas de Tolosa that was fought on June 16, 1212, and, according to Rodrigo Jiménez de Rada in his work De rebus Hispaniae, while Diego López de Haro was at the forefront of the vanguard, Gonzalo « with the friars of the Temple, of the Hospital, of Uclés, and of Calatrava (commanded) the central nucleus". She was rescued by Gonzalo, along with Martín Núñez de Hinojosa and troops from Madrid and Huete.

Once again the Castilians had to confront Alfonso IX who was trying to get King Alfonso VIII to return some places he had taken, although thanks to the mediation of the Lord of Vizcaya, both kings reached an agreement and Gonzalo returned to the kingdom of León and was in Galicia when King Alfonso VIII of Castile died in 1214.

When the confrontations in Castilla after the death of Alfonso VIII, Gonzalo at first was not with his brothers since thanks to the agreement between Bishop Rodrigo Jiménez de Rada, Queen Berenguela, and Álvaro Núñez de Lara, their presence was not necessary. By January 1215, he was at the court of the new Castilian king, the child Enrique I of Castile, and it was at that time that his brother Álvaro, tutor of the child-king, granted Gonzalo the dignity of count. He played an active role in the Castilian court during those dates and intervened in the Treaty of Toro of 1216. When the war broke out between the Castilian sides, his brother Álvaro, regent of the kingdom, sent him to fight in Miranda de Ebro against Lope Díaz de Haro, although he did not engage in combat through the mediation of the clergy. His brother rewarded him and made King Enrique give Gonzalo the castle of Grañón and its lands where Belorado was integrated, which became part of his lordship.

He remained in Castile until the death of Enrique I in 1217. The Laras were opposed to Berenguela and the new king Ferdinand III since he tried to "attract two of the regions within the sphere of influence of the sons of Nuño Pérez de Lara: Belorado and Nájera", although the Castilian king had to give up when he was unable to take the fortresses occupied by Count Gonzalo Núñez. Seeing that various sectors of the nobility and the clergy recognized the rights of Berenguela and his son Fernando III of Castilla, the Lara resisted, but once Count Álvaro de Lara was captured, his brothers Fernando and Gonzalo Núñez de Lara capitulated.

== Death ==
According to Rodrigo Jiménez de Rada in his work De rebus Hispaniae, Count Gonzalo died in 1222 in Baena:16

...since Count Gonzalo Núñez, who had gone with the Arabs, could not win the favor of the King of Castile as he had intended, he returned again with the Agarenes; and when he was in the lands of Córdoba, he died due to a very serious illness in the town called Baena and, transferred by his people, he was buried in Cefinis where the friars of the Temple have an oratory.

However, Gonzalo appears in several documents after that date, which contradicts Jiménez de Rada's version. In June 1224 he confirmed several Castilian diplomas and it could be that when he was in Baena he fell ill and asked to be buried in Ceinos de Campos, but he recovered and returned to the Christian kingdoms. The following year, together with his wife María and their children Diego and Nuño, they made a donation to the monastery of San Andrés de Arroyo and in 1227, he and his wife sold some properties in Cisneros to the abbey of Santa María de Benevívere, which indicates that He did not die in Baena but in Castilian-Leon lands.18 He also appears around 1230 in the monastery of Las Huelgas de Burgos when he pledged his estate in Cuenca to his brother Count Fernando.19

== Marriages and offspring ==
According to a document from the monastery of Santa María de Sobrad in December 1201, Gonzalo contracted his first marriage with Jimena Meléndez, a Galician noblewoman, possibly the sister of Nuño Meléndez, the first husband of Queen Urraca López de Haro.

His second marriage was with María Díaz de Haro, daughter of the Lord of Vizcaya, Count Diego López II de Haro and his second wife Toda Pérez de Azagra. After becoming a widow, María was able to enter the Monastery of San Andrés de Arroyo, where, after completing the novitiate, she succeeded her aunt Mencía López de Haro as abbess. From this marriage the following were born:

- Nuño González de Lara (d. Écija, 1275), called the Good, Lord of the House of Lara, participated in the conquest of Seville and other Andalusian places with Fernando III and was the husband of Teresa Alfonso de León, Alfonso's illegitimate daughter IX of León.
- Diego González de Lara, appears in the documentation confirming royal diplomas between 1235 and 1239.
- Fernando González de Lara.
- Teresa González de Lara (died between September 1244 and 1246), was the second wife of the infante Alfonso de Molina and mother of Juana Alfonso de Molina who married Lope Díaz III de Haro in 1269.22 In September 1244, Together with her brother Nuño, she granted a deed in which she declared herself Lady of Molina and daughter of Count Gonzalo Núñez de Lara, through which both sold all the foreign currency they had in Santa María de Sasamón to the bishop and to the Cathedral of Burgos.

== Bibliography ==
- Doubleday, Simon R. (2004). Los Lara. Nobleza y morarquía en la España Medieval. Madrid: Turner Publicaciones, S.L. y C.S.I.C. ISBN 84-7506-650-X.
- Estepa Díez, Carlos (2006). "Frontera, nobleza y señoríos en Castilla: el señorío de Molina (siglos XII-XIII)". Studia histórica Historia medieval (24). Salamanca: Ediciones Universidad de Salamanca: 15–86. ISSN 0213-2060.
- Sánchez de Mora, Antonio (2003). La nobleza castellana en la plena Edad Media: el linaje de Lara (PhD). Universidad de Sevilla.
- Sánchez de Mora, Antonio (2004). "Nuño González de Lara: "El más poderoso omne que sennor ouiese e más honrado de Espanna"". Historia, instituciones, documentos (31). Sevilla: Universidad de Sevilla: Departamento de Historia Medieval y Ciencias y Técnicas Historiográficas: 631–644. ISSN 0210-7716.
- Torres Sevilla-Quiñones de León, Margarita Cecilia (1999). Linajes nobiliarios de León y Castilla: Siglos IX-XIII. Salamanca: Junta de Castilla y León, Consejería de educación y cultura. ISBN 84-7846-781-5.
