= Moratinos =

Moratinos may refer to

- Moratinos, Palencia, a municipality in the province of Palencia, Spain
- José Lebrún Moratinos (1919-2001), Archbishop of Caracas, Venezuela in 1980-1995
- Miguel Ángel Moratinos (born 1951), Spanish diplomat and politician
