= Suero Rodríguez =

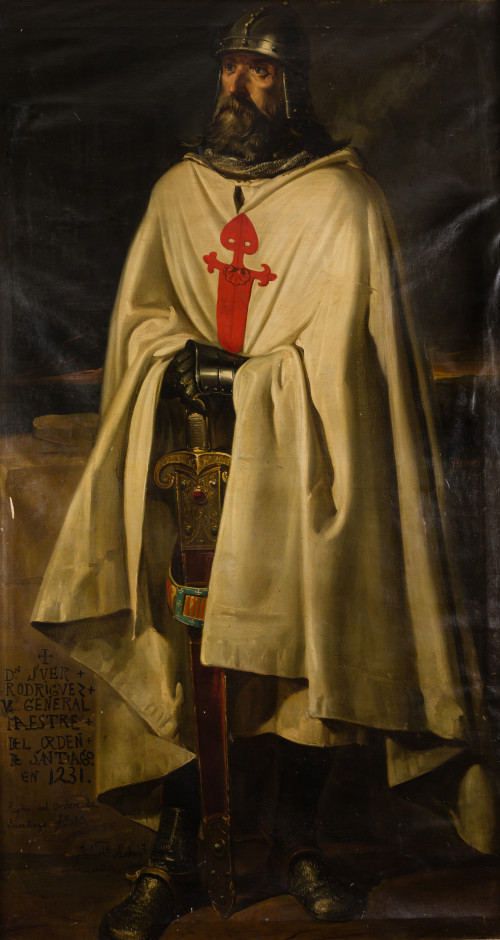
19th-century representation of Suero by José María Rodríguez de Losada

Suero Rodríguez (died 23 April 1206) was the fifth grand master of the Order of Santiago from 1204 until his death.

Suero was a Galician, the son of Rodrigo Velázquez. He may have been a member of the confraternity of Cáceres organized by Pedro Fernández de Castro, which became the Order of Santiago in 1170. He served the order as comendador of Palmela and its chief representative in Portugal, where King Sancho I gave him lands in Santarém and Santos for a new house for the order in 1193–94.

Suero succeeded Gonzalo Rodríguez upon the latter's resignation in 1204. During his two years as master, Pope Innocent III confirmed the orders rule. In 1205, King Alfonso VIII of Castile donated a property in the village of Gorocica to the order and confirmed the donation of the castle of Carabanchel by Count Fernando Núñez de Lara. Alfonso also gave to the monastery of San Audito during Suero's tenure. Because Alfonso was at peace with the Almohads, Suero sent his knights to Aragon to fight the Almohads.

Older sources sometimes have Suero resigning the mastership in 1205, but he held it until his death the following year. He was succeeded by Fernando González de Marañón.
