= Siege of Cuenca =

Siege of Cuenca may refer to:

- Conquest of Cuenca (1177), during the Reconquista
- Siege of Cuenca (1706), during the War of the Spanish Succession
