= Fernando González de Marañón =

Fernando González de Marañón (died April 1219) was the sixth Grand Master of the Order of Santiago from 1206 until 1210.

Fernando was born in the second half of the twelfth century. His family was of Navarrese origin, but active in the kingdom of Castile. He was the son of Count Gonzalo de Marañón, who may have been a member of the confraternity of Cáceres organized by Pedro Fernández de Castro, which became the Order of Santiago in 1170.

Fernando succeeded Suero Rodríguez as grand master in 1206. He resettled the domains owned by his order, granting fueros to Huélamo and Villarrubia de Santiago and new rights to Ocaña. He reached an agreement on cooperation with the Order of Calatrava and maintained good relations with the Papacy. Between 1207 and 1210, he received five bulls from Innocent III dealing with the rights of the order, its internal discipline and its relations with the secular clergy, among other things.

Since the truces that Alfonso VIII of Castile had signed with the Almohads prevented the order from fulfilling its purpose of fighting them, Fernando received Innocent III's approval to bring his knights into the service of King Peter II of Aragon. In 1210, he went from Uclés through Albarracín to join Peter II's offensive towards Valencia and Murcia. The knights of Santiago captured the fortresses of Jabaloyas, Villarquemado and Fontaner before joining the siege of Montalbán. Peter left the siege early and the castle was captured by the knights. In June, Peter conferred it on them and it became their headquarters in Aragon.

Fernando resigned the mastership later in 1210 and died in April 1219. A contrary report is given by Francisco de Rades y Andrada, according to which Fernando died shortly after the conquest of Montalbán and was buried in Alarcón.
