= San Nicolás del Real Camino =

Coordinates: 42°22′N 4°57′W

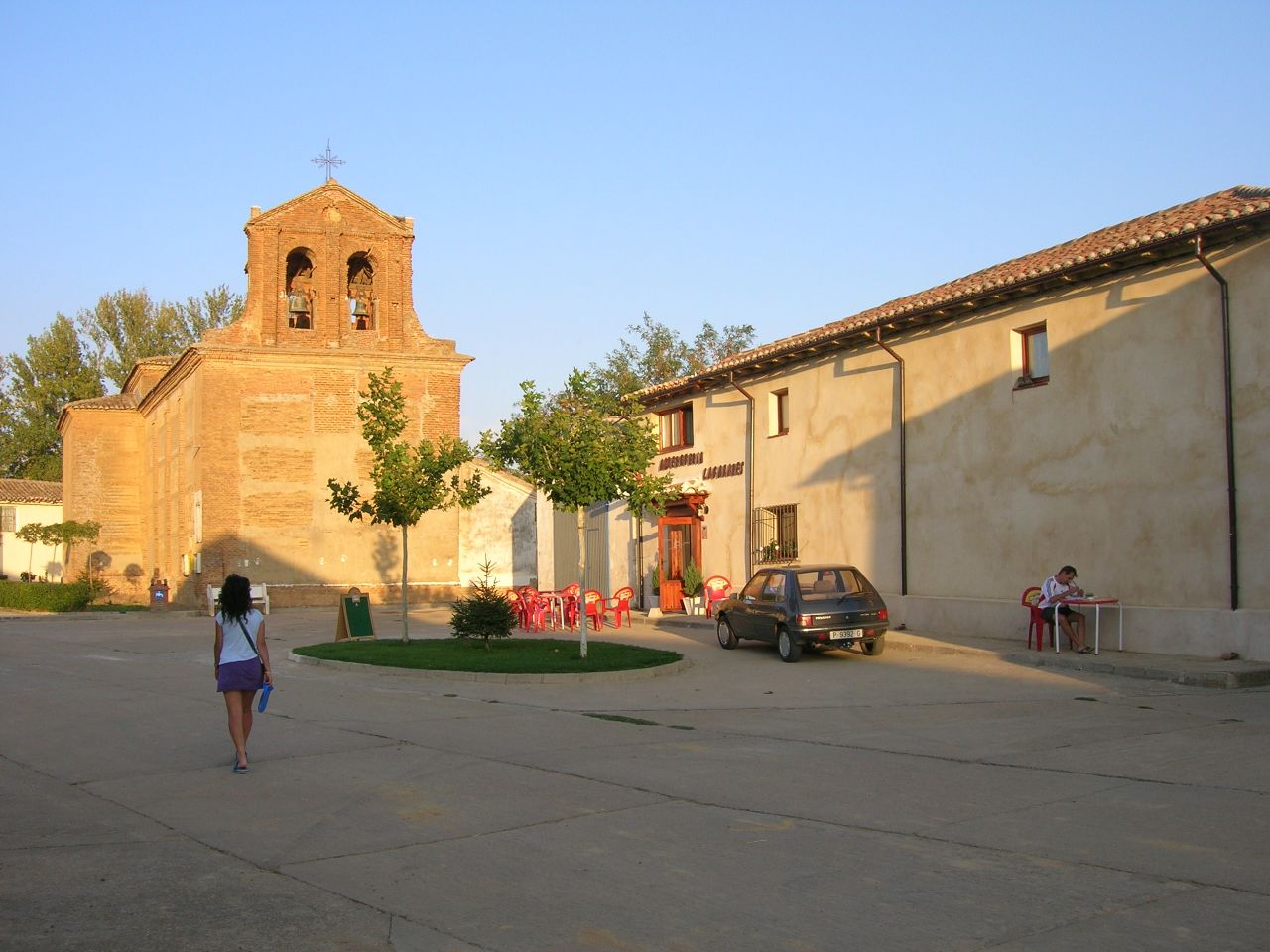
- Church in San Nicolás del Real Camino
- Interactive map of San Nicolás del Real Camino
- Country: Spain
- Province: Palencia
- Municipality: Moratinos
- Elevation: 840 m (2,760 ft)

Population (2012)
  - Total: 46
- Time zone: UTC+1 (CET)
  - Summer (DST): UTC+2 (CEST)

San Nicolás del Real Camino is a village under the local government of the municipality of Moratinos, Palencia, Spain.
