= Teresa Fernández de Traba =

Spanish queen consort

Teresa Fernández de Traba (died 6 February 1180 in León) was the Queen consort of León (1178–1180) during the reign of Ferdinand II.

== Family ==
Teresa was the illegitimate daughter of Theresa, Countess of Portugal, and Fernando Pérez de Traba, Lord of Trastamara. She was already married to Count Nuño Pérez de Lara in 1152 when both ceded Castronuño to its inhabitants and established its borders, maintaining certain rights over the village after King Alfonso VII of León and Castile donated it in 1156 or 1157 to the Knights Hospitaller. On 29 January 1160 Teresa and husband Nuño founded the Cistercian convent of Santa María at Perales, donating to Ozenda, the first abbess, all their properties in Perales and Zorita. In 1174, they gave the bishop of Burgos the village of Barchilona in exchange for all the rights and properties of the hospital in Puente de Fitero which they had founded and donated to the Knights Hospitaller. Following the death of Nuño in 1177, Teresa went to the Leonese court, and there, before 7 October 1178, she married King Ferdinand II of León (1137–1188). Thanks to this marriage, her children lived at the court and boasted of being the offspring of a queen of León as attested by a charter where her son Álvaro making a donation to the Monastery of Sobrado called himself filius comitis domni Nunonis et regine domne Tarasie.

== Death and Burial ==
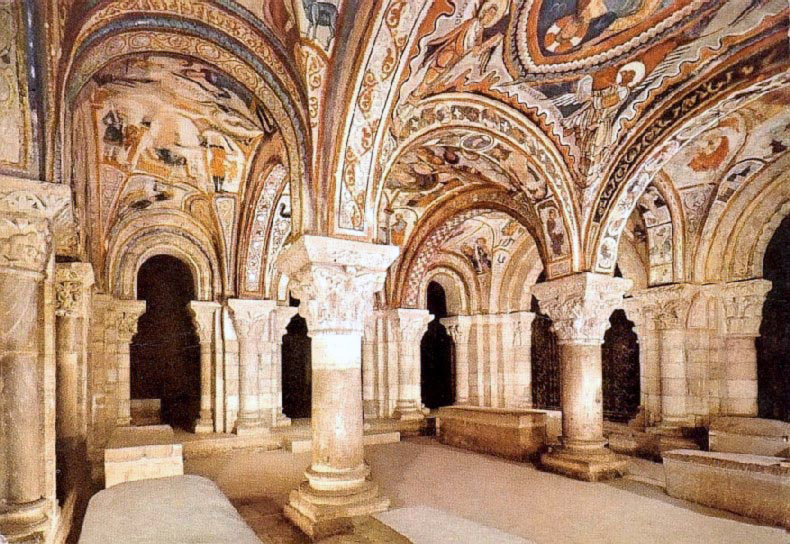
The Royal Pantheon

She died as a result of childbirth two years later, on 6 February 1180 and was buried at the Royal Pantheon in the Basilica of San Isidoro in León. Her remains were placed in a stone coffin the cover of which bore a half-length effigy of the late queen wearing a dress with tight gem-studded cuffs and neckline. Her hair was loose and a royal crown was placed around her forehead and the following Latin inscription was carved around the edges of the cover of her tomb:

LARGA MANUS MISERIS, ET DIGNIS DIGNA REPENDENS CONSTANS, ET PRUDENS PIETATIS MUNERE SPLENDENS, HIC REGINA JACET CONJUX TARESIA REGIS FERNANDI SUMMI SIBI DENTUR GAUDIA REGIS. ERA MCCXVIII. ET QTT. VII. ID. FEBRUARII.

== Issue ==
She had children by both husbands, by Nuño Pérez de Lara having:

1. Fernando, married countess Mayor González Salvadórez, with issue. Mayor founded the Ermita de la Virgen de la Esperina.
2. Álvaro (d. 1218), married Urraca Díaz de Haro, without issue. Once widowed, Urraca became a nun and was the abbess at the Monastery of Cañas. Álvaro had several children by his mistress Teresa Gil de Osorno.
3. Gonzalo (d. 1225), married firstly Jimena Meléndez, without issue. He then married María Díaz de Haro, daughter of Diego López II de Haro, parents of Leonor, Nuño, Teresa, Diego, and Fernando González de Lara. After Gonzalo's death, María became a nun and succeeded her aunt Mencía López de Haro as the abbess at the Monastery of San Andrés de Arroyo.
4. Sancha, wife of Sancho, Count of Provence
5. María, abbess of Perales
6. Elvira, countess, married Ermengol VIII, Count of Urgell around 1176. The couple had strong disagreements and in 1203 promised to treat each other with love and not to hurt the other. After the count's death, Elvira married Guillén de Cervera.

By Ferdinand II of León, she had two sons:

1. Ferdinand, Infante of León (1179–1187).
2. Sancho, Infante of León (1180).

== Sources ==
- Barton, Simon. The Aristocracy in Twelfth-century León and Castile. Cambridge: Cambridge University Press, 1997.
- Fernández-Xesta y Vázquez, Ernesto (2001). Relaciones del condado de Urgel con Castilla y León. Madrid: E&P Libros Antiguos, S.L. p. 21. ISBN 84-87860-37-0.
- Sánchez de Mora, Antonio (2003). "La Nobleza Castellana en la Plena Edad Media: El Linaje de Lara (ss. XI-XIII), Doctoral Thesis" (in Spanish). Universidad de Sevilla.
- Yáñez Neira, María Damián (1988). "El monasterio cisterciense de Perales, cuna de la recolección (Publicaciones de la Institución Tello Téllez de Meneses)" (in Spanish). pp. 387–414.
- Estepa Díez, Carlos (2006). "Frontera, nobleza y señoríos en Castilla: el señorío de Molina (Studia_H_Historia_Medieval/article/viewFile/4520/4536" (in Spanish). pp. 15–86.

Preceded by Urraca of Portugal	Queen Consort of León; 1178–1180	Succeeded by Urraca López de Haro
