= García Garcés de Aza =

Castilian magnate

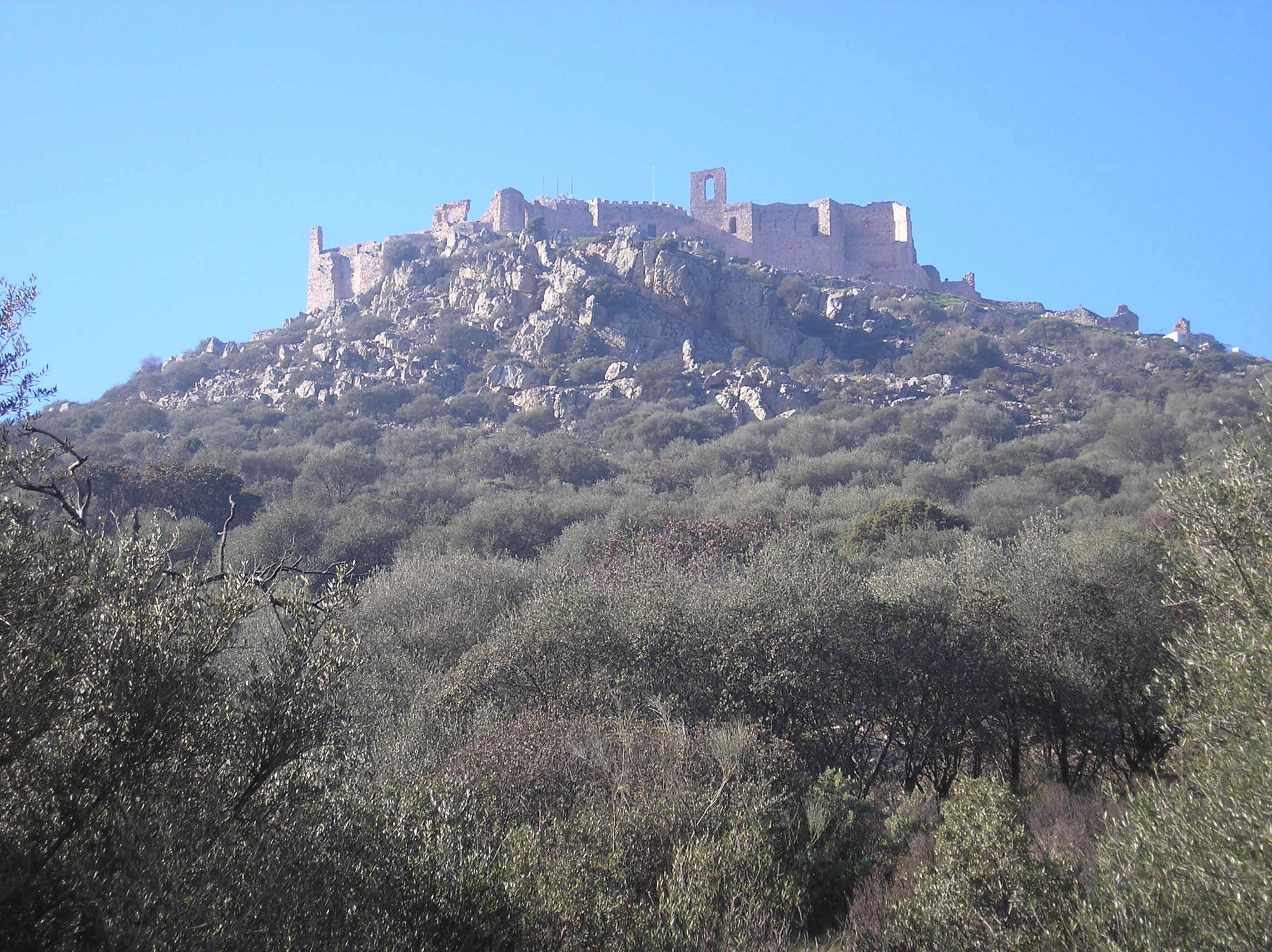
The castle of Calatrava, which García probably defended during the 1147 campaign of Alfonso VII

García Garcés de Aza (Latin: Garsias Garsie de Aza; floruit 1126–1159) was a Castilian magnate "renowned for his wealth and dullness", yet "a prominent figure in the later Andalusian campaigns of the Emperor between 1150 and 1157". His toponymic appears in contemporary documents, referring to his ownership of the tenencia of Aza. His patronymic, "Garcés", reflects that he was son of count García Ordóñez, born to the latter's second wife, Eva, probably a Frenchwoman. After the death of García Ordóñez, she remarried to Pedro González de Lara, making García Garcés half-brother of Eva's children by Pedro and closely allied with the House of Lara.

According to the Chronica Adefonsi imperatoris, a contemporary account of the deeds of the Emperor Alfonso VII of León and Castile, when that king first entered the capital city of León after his succession in March 1126, García Garcés was among the Castilians who came to do homage and pledge fealty. García served Alfonso as alférez between 12 December 1126 and 13 November 1127, while his brother Pedro Garcés was alférez between 29 May and 18 September 1131. This post was generally reserved for younger nobleman early in their careers, the different dates of their respective tenures reflect the difference in their ages. In 1142 García was acting as a civil judge in Ávila.

In 1147, during Alfonso VII's summer campaign against Almería, García does not appear to have joined the army until later, for he does not appear in any document emanating from Alfonso's court until 4 June, when he was at Calatrava. He neither appears in any later royal charters issued during the campaign, suggesting that he may have been posted at Calatrava with a garrison and did not take part in the sieges of Andújar, Baeza, or Almería.

On 10 November 1155, while both were with the royal court at Ayllón, García sold an estate at Alcolea to his half-brother Manrique Pérez de Lara for one thousand maravedís. The charter of sale was drawn up by a certain Sancho, who signed it as "chancellor of Count Manrique". García married a younger daughter of Pedro Fróilaz de Traba, sometimes named Eva and other times Sancha. In 1157, with his wife, Sancha Pérez, García donated their monasterium (monastic church) of San Florencio near Aza to the abbey of Santo Domingo de Silos "for the relief of our souls and the remission of all our sins". García and his wife had at least two daughters: Elvira and Mayor, who married Gonzalo de Marañón. He may have had another two, named Sancha and María, but a Juana, mother of Domingo de Caleruega, is apocryphal.

In 1159, according to Rodrigo Jiménez de Rada in his De rebus Hispaniae, the Lara family, after they had succeeded by guile in wresting custody of the young King Alfonso VIII from his guardian, Gutierre Fernández de Castro, placed him under the care of García Garcés. It soon became apparent, however, that he was not wealthy enough to properly look after royalty and he was placed in the household of Manrique. Also in 1159, García donated the hostel of Tardajos to the Diocese of Burgos.

== Bibliography ==
- Simon F. Barton. The Aristocracy in Twelfth-century León and Castile. Cambridge: Cambridge University Press, 1997.
- Simon R. Doubleday. The Lara Family: Crown and Nobility in Medieval Spain. Cambridge, Massachusetts: Harvard University Press, 2001.
- Richard A. Fletcher. Saint James's Catapult: The Life and Times of Diego Gelmírez of Santiago de Compostela. Oxford: Oxford University Press, 1984.
- Glenn Edward Lipskey. The Chronicle of Alfonso the Emperor: A Translation of the Chronica Adefonsi imperatoris. PhD dissertation, Northwestern University. 1972.
- Gonzalo Martínez Díez. "Orígenes familiares de Santo Domingo, los linajes de Aza y Guzmán". Santo Domingo de Caleruega, en su contexto socio-político, 1170–1221, edd. Cándido Aniz Iriarte and Luis Vicente Díaz Martín. Editorial San Esteban, 1994, 173–228.
- Faustino Menéndez Pidal de Navascués. "Los sellos de los señores de Molina". Anuario de estudios medievales, 14 (1984), 101–119.
- Antonio Sánchez de Mora. La nobleza castellana en la plena Edad Media: el linaje de Lara (SS. XI–XIII). Doctoral Thesis, University of Seville, 2003.
