= Conquest of Cuenca =

Capture of Cuenca by Alfonso VIII in 1177 during the Reconquista

- Part of Reconquista and Almohad wars in the Iberian Peninsula
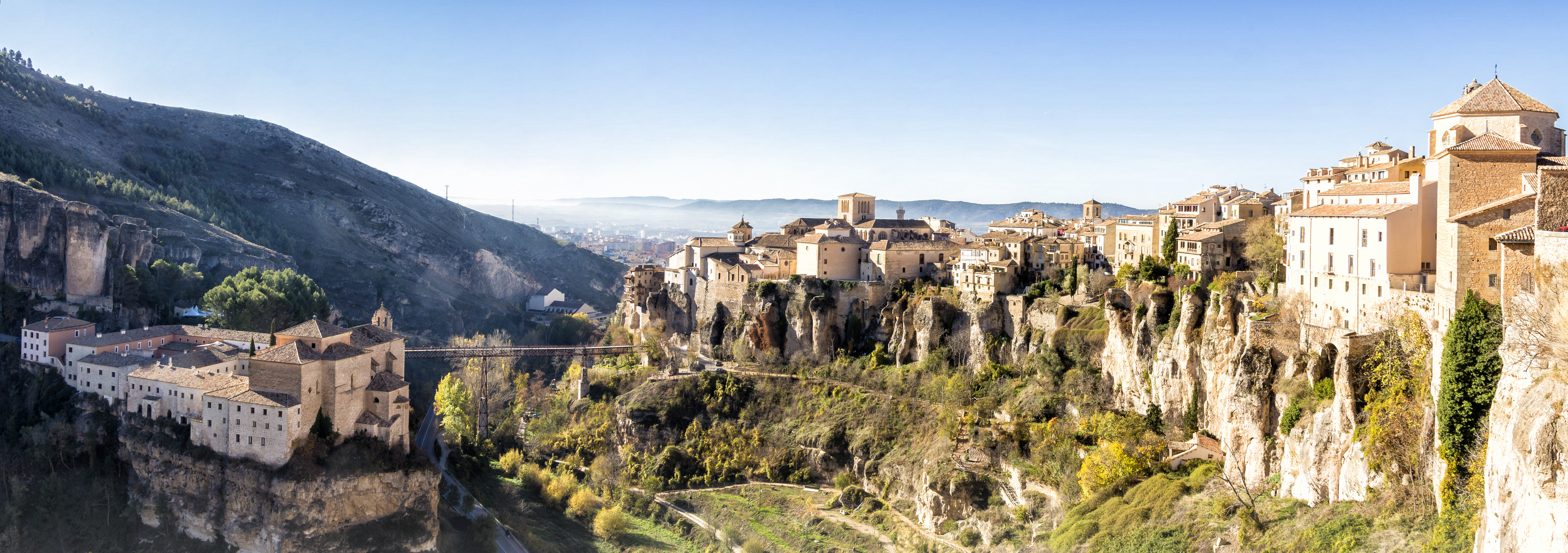
- Panoramic view of Cuenca
Date	6 January – 21 September 1177
Location	Cuenca, Almohad Caliphate
Result	Christian victory
Territorial changes	Castilian occupation of the city

Belligerents
Kingdom of Castile; Kingdom of Aragon; Kingdom of León	Almohad Caliphate

Commanders and leaders
Alfonso VIII of Castile; Alfonso II of Aragon; Ferdinand II of León; Nuño Pérez de Lara †; Berenguer de Vilademuls	Abu Beka

The Conquest of Cuenca was the siege of the city of Cuenca led by Alfonso VIII of Castile and Alfonso II of Aragon in 1177. The siege lasted for over nine months until the city was surrendered by the Almohads on 21 September.

== Background ==
For most of the 12th Century, the Tagus River served as a defensive barrier and natural border between the Christian and Muslim polities on the Iberian Peninsula. In 1172, however, Yusuf I, the Caliph of the Almohads, began to raid Castilian garrisons along the border including Huete.

Alfonso VIII retaliated and raided Cuenca, the Almohad military outpost that the Muslims used to coordinate their attacks on the Kingdom of Castile. Alfonso VIII besieged Cuenca for five months, but was forced to lift the siege when Yusuf I arrived with a relief army and sent a force to attack Huete. Included in the Almohad relief force was Yusuf I’s son, Yaqub al-Mansur, the future Caliph; the philosopher Averroes; and the historian Sahib as-Sala (who provided an eyewitness account of the conflict.) Although the city of Cuenca was relieved, the Almohads failed to take Huete, and, as a result, Yusuf I and Alfonso VIII entered into a seven-year truce.

The truce was broken in the summer of 1176 when the Muslims of Cuenca, together with those of Alarcón and Moya, attacked the cities of Huete and Uclés, breaking the pact.

As a result, Alfonso VIII summoned a broad coalition of his Christian allies including the King of Aragon, Alfonso II; the King of León, Ferdinand II; the Lord of Albarracín, Pedro Ruiz de Azagra; knights from the military orders of the Hospitallers and the Calatrava; and noblemen from Castile, León, and Aragon including Nuño Pérez de Lara, Pedro Gutiérrez, Àlvar Fáñez, Tello Pérez, and Nuño Sánchez. On 6 January, 1177, the Christian force laid siege to the city of Cuenca.

Among the Christians accompanying Alfonso II to the siege of Cuenca from the Kingdom of Aragon were peons organized into quick moving, lightly armed infantry units known as Almogavars. After arriving at Cuenca, Alfonso II traveled to Catalonia and even Provence returning later with the Archbishop of Tarragona, Berenguer de Vilademuls, and soldiers from the city of Tarragona and the region of Camp de Tarragona.

== Siege ==
Cuenca, considered impregnable, suffered a long and brutal siege that would ultimately last over nine months. Over time, the forces besieging the city swelled by a large number of foreign reinforcements after Cardinal Legate Giacinto Bobone granted the siege official crusade status, offering indulgences to participants.

The leader of Muslims at Cuenca, Abu Beka, asked for help from the Almohad caliph Abu Yaqub, but relief was denied. On 27 July, the Muslims attempted to kill King Alfonso VIII by means of a sortie focused on the Christian camp, however, the Muslims were only successful in killing the Count of Lara.

Ultimately, deaths from continuous attacks, disease, and hunger caused the Almohads to surrender on 21 September. In October, after the Christian forces occupied the citadel and the Muslims abandoned the city, Alfonso VIII and his retinue triumphantly entered the city, adding it formally to the Kingdom of Castile.

== Aftermath ==
The loss of Cuenca in 1177 was a significant loss to the Almohads. The city was considered impregnable and its loss demonstrated to the Caliph and his advisors such as Averroes that even the strongest Muslim strongholds could no longer withstand a sustained, united Christian assault.

For the Christians it represented a strategic breakthrough in that it removed the threat to Toledo and Huete. No longer would the Almohads be able to launch deep raids into Christian territory. The former volatile frontier was now secure. The conquest shifted Christian focus south of the Tagus River toward the Júcar and Cabriel rivers, establishing a new defensive line that provided for the capture of Alarcón in 1183.

The siege also forced the quarreling Christian kingdoms of Castile and Aragon into a successful, long-term military alliance. As a reward for his participation in the siege of Cuenca, Alfonso II and his successors were formally released in perpetuity from vassalage to Castile, fostering a more equal partnership that was later solidified in the Treaty of Cazola of 1179.

Finally, the conquest of Cuenca and the creation of the Fuero de Cuenca legal code years later would also become a model for the successful colonialization of dangerous territory and the gold standard for municipal law across Iberia for centuries.
