= Vileña =

Coordinates: 42°37′N 3°19′W

Vileña, Spain
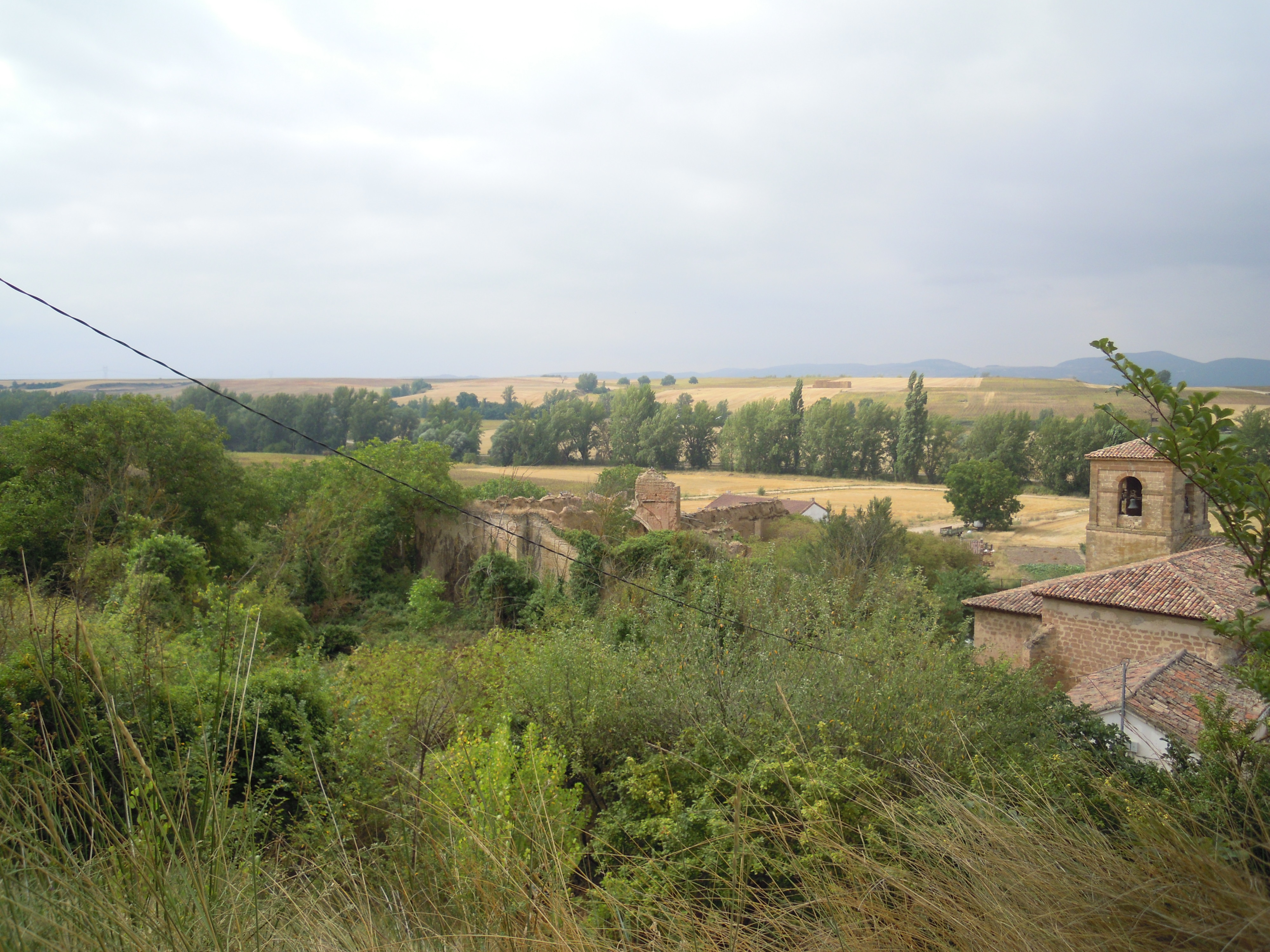
- Ruins of the Monastery of Vileña Burgos and church

- Coat of arms
- Interactive map of Vileña, Spain
- Country: Spain
- Autonomous community: Castile and León
- Province: Burgos
- Municipality: Vileña

Area
  - Total: 6 km^{2} (2.3 sq mi)

Population (2025-01-01)
  - Total: 23
  - Density: 3.8/km^{2} (9.9/sq mi)
- Time zone: UTC+1 (CET)
  - Summer (DST): UTC+2 (CEST)

Vileña is a municipality located in the province of Burgos, Castile and León, Spain. According to the 2004 census (INE), the municipality has a population of 31.
