= Gonzalo de Marañón =

12th century Castilian magnate

Gonzalo de Marañón (floruit 1141–1178) was a Castilian magnate during the reigns of Alfonso VII (1126–57), Sancho III (1157–58), and Alfonso VIII (1158–1214). By January 1174 he had attained the rank of count (Latin comes), the highest in the kingdom. He was one of the earliest members of the Spanish nobility to adopt a toponymic surname (in this case "de Marañón") as a family name. His interests lay in the far east of the kingdom, in areas once (and again today) a part Navarre, and his toponymic indicates Navarrese origins.

Although, according to Luis de Salazar y Castro, his father was Rodrigo Pérez de Marañón, this filiation has not been documented. He married Mayor García de Aza, daughter of García Garcés de Aza and his wife, Sancha Pérez. Their marriage is first recorded in 1169, when Alfonso VIII made a donation of the village of Villasequilla to the couple. Gonzalo was a frequent recipient of royal largesse. On 19 September 1144 Alfonso VII granted him the village of Sartaguda, and in 1176 Alfonso VIII confirmed all the grants previously made—though we cannot be sure what all they were—save that of Mamblas. In 1148 Manrique Pérez de Lara and his relatives gave some houses in Toledo to Gonzalo, allowing him to expand his interests into the largest and most prosperous city in the kingdom.

As a young man, between February 1155 and July 1157, Gonzalo held the post of alférez at the court of Alfonso VII, the last of Alfonso's alférezes. He was thus in charge of the royal military entourage, an office usually reserved for young noblemen, although he held it again under Alfonso VIII from November 1171 until his death. Between November 1153 and 1172 he held the tenencia of Peñafiel. He founded the Cistercian monastery of Bujedo de Juarros in 1159, and endowed the Benedictine house of San Salvador de Toledo in 1163.

The last record of Gonzalo dates from November 1178. His widow, Mayor, was still living in January 1182 when she, jointly with her children who confirm the charter, founded a Cistercian convent in the village of Aza. The children, as recorded in this charter, were Fernando, Pedro, Alberico, Nuño, Domicio, and Inés, who entered the nunnery on that date. The properties donated for the foundation of the convent, attached to the Monastery of Bujedo de Juarros, were situated in Aza, Torregalindo, Zorita, Hontangas, Sepúlveda, Camareno, and other places. Three of his sons entered the Order of Santiago, and the eldest rose to the rank of Grand Master.
