= Alcabón =

Coordinates: 40°00′N 4°22′W

Alcabón, Spain
- Flag Coat of arms

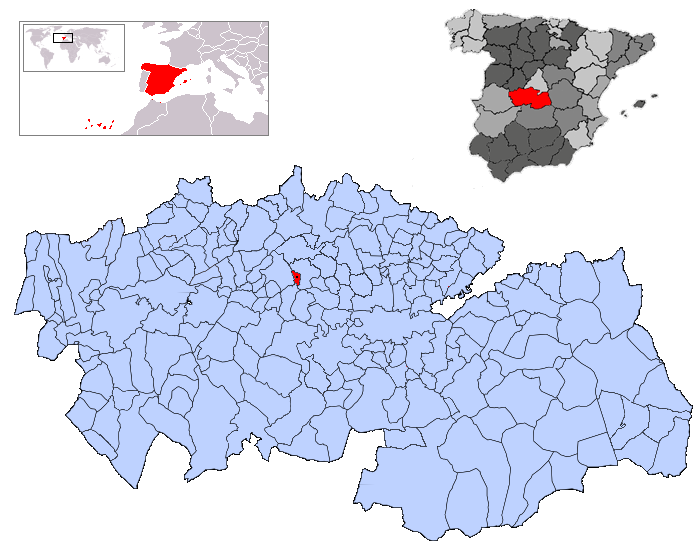
- Country: Spain
- Autonomous community: Castile-La Mancha
- Province: Toledo
- Municipality: Alcabón

Government
  - Mayor: José Agustin Congosto del Cerro

Area
  - Total: 8.02 km^{2} (3.10 sq mi)
- Elevation: 534 m (1,752 ft)

Population (2025-01-01)
  - Total: 792
  - Density: 98.8/km^{2} (256/sq mi)
- Time zone: UTC+1 (CET)
  - Summer (DST): UTC+2 (CEST)
- Postal code: 45523
- Area code: 925
- Website: www.alcabon.es

Alcabón is a municipality located in the province of Toledo, Castile-La Mancha, Spain. According to the 2022 census (INE), the municipality had a population of 743 inhabitants.

== Toponym ==
The term "Alcabón" is of Arabic origin, and could mean the "cove". It is thought that its origin is due to the presence of some farmhouses, hence its old name was "Alcabón Homes".

== Location ==
The municipality is located in the Torrijos region and adjoins the populations of Santo Domingo-Caudilla, Carmena and Santa Olalla, all of which are in Toledo.

== History ==
There is data which indicates Alcabón's existence since 1095. By cession of Alfonso VII of Castile in 1156, it passed into the hands of Count Nuño Petriz or Pérez de Lara who handed over the Alcabón castle to the archbishop of Toledo, Don Juan, in exchange for "La Rinconada de Perales".

In 1179 Queen Eleanor of England donated Alcabón to the St. Thomas Cantuariense chapel, located within the Santa Maria de Toledo cathedral, remaining so until its sale in 1482 to Gutierre de Cardenas, first Duke of Maqueda.

During the War of Spanish Independence it suffered violently under the hands of the French army. Thinking that the Spanish troops were in the town, they ordered its looting and destruction.

== Administration ==
List of mayors since the democratic elections of 1979
Term	Mayor	Political party
1979–1983	Longinos García Gutiérrez	Independiente
1983–1987	Longinos García Gutiérrez	PP AP/PDP/UL
1987–1991	José Antonio Rodríguez Garrido	PSOE
1991–1995	José Antonio Rodríguez Garrido	PSOE
1995–1999	José Antonio Rodríguez Garrido	PSOE
1999–2003	José Antonio Rodríguez Garrido	PSOE
2003–2007	María Rubí Rodríguez del Pozo	PSOE
2007–2011	José Antonio Rodríguez Garrido	PSOE
2011–2015	Julio Jesús Gonzalo Valverde	PP
2015–2019	José Antonio Rodríguez Garrido	PSOE
2019–2023	Jose Agustín Congosto del Cerro	PP
2023–	n/d	n/d

== Demography ==
demographic vertical bar chart of between 1842 and 2022
Population evolution according to the Instituto Nacional de Estadística.

== Monuments ==
Among the monuments in Alcabón are the Virgen de la Aurora Hermitage, a small shrine of great devotion in the county built in 1606, the St. Thomas Cantuariense and Rollo de Justicia churches, which have octagonal shaft columns and capitals decorated with balls and having a brick base, the Alcabón Mill Museum of Oil and Wine (16th century). There are details in this mill that suggest that its age could be traced back to the time of Arab domination (8th to 11th century). Possibly in its typology, the most complete and oldest of which have remained to present day.

== Celebrations ==
- 8 September - Patron feasts in honor of the Virgin of la Aurora.
- 29 December - Saint Thomas of Canterbury
