= Villavaquerín =

Coordinates: 41°40′N 4°28′W

Villavaquerín, Spain
- Flag Coat of arms

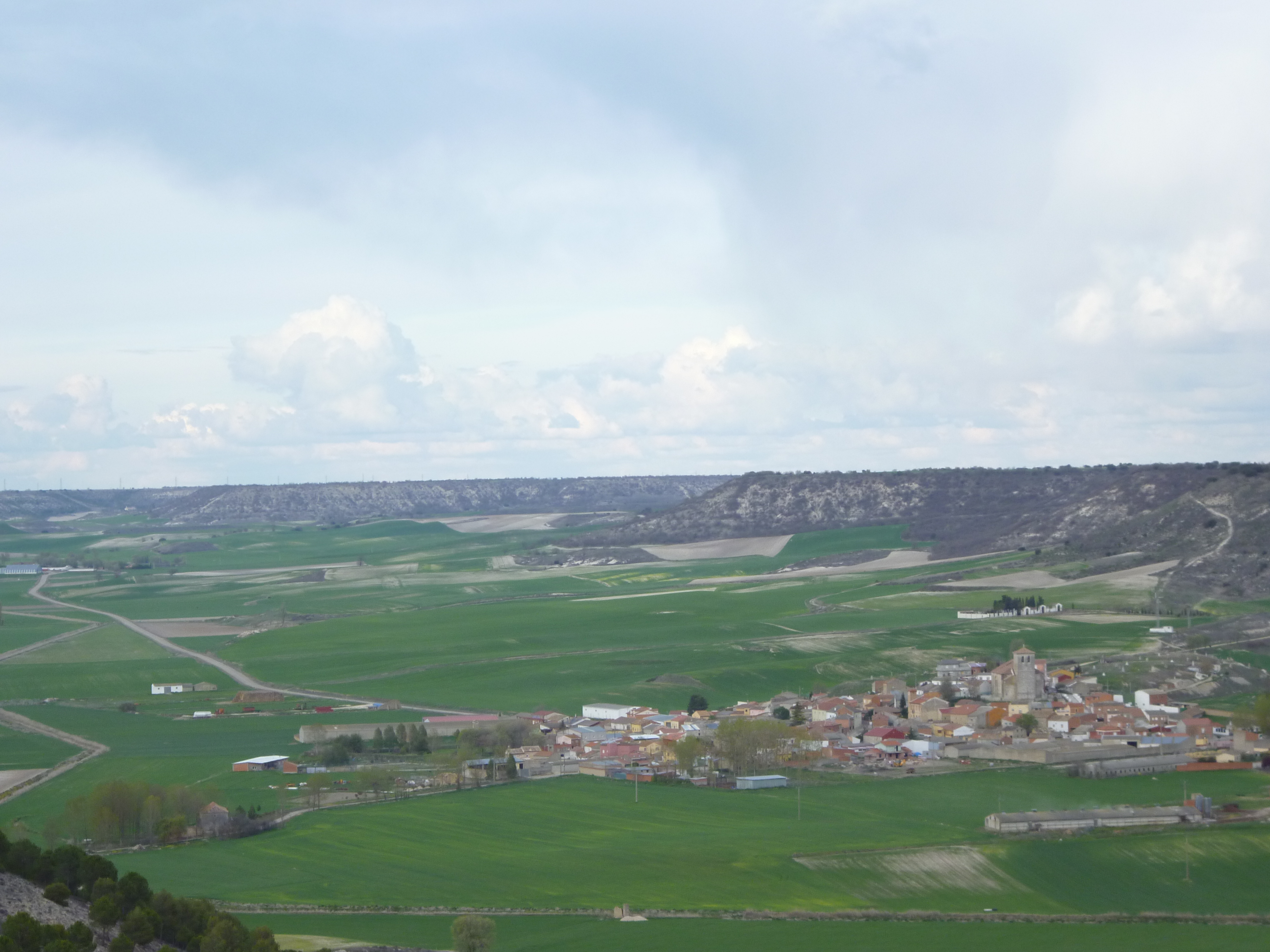
- panoramic view
- Country: Spain
- Autonomous community: Castile and León
- Province: Valladolid
- Municipality: Villavaquerín

Area
  - Total: 45.11 km^{2} (17.42 sq mi)
- Elevation: 769 m (2,523 ft)

Population (2025-01-01)
  - Total: 155
  - Density: 3.44/km^{2} (8.90/sq mi)
- Time zone: UTC+1 (CET)
  - Summer (DST): UTC+2 (CEST)

Villavaquerín is a municipality located in the province of Valladolid, Castile and León, Spain. According to the 2004 census (INE), the municipality had a population of 206 inhabitants.
