= Cuenca de Campos =

- Municipality
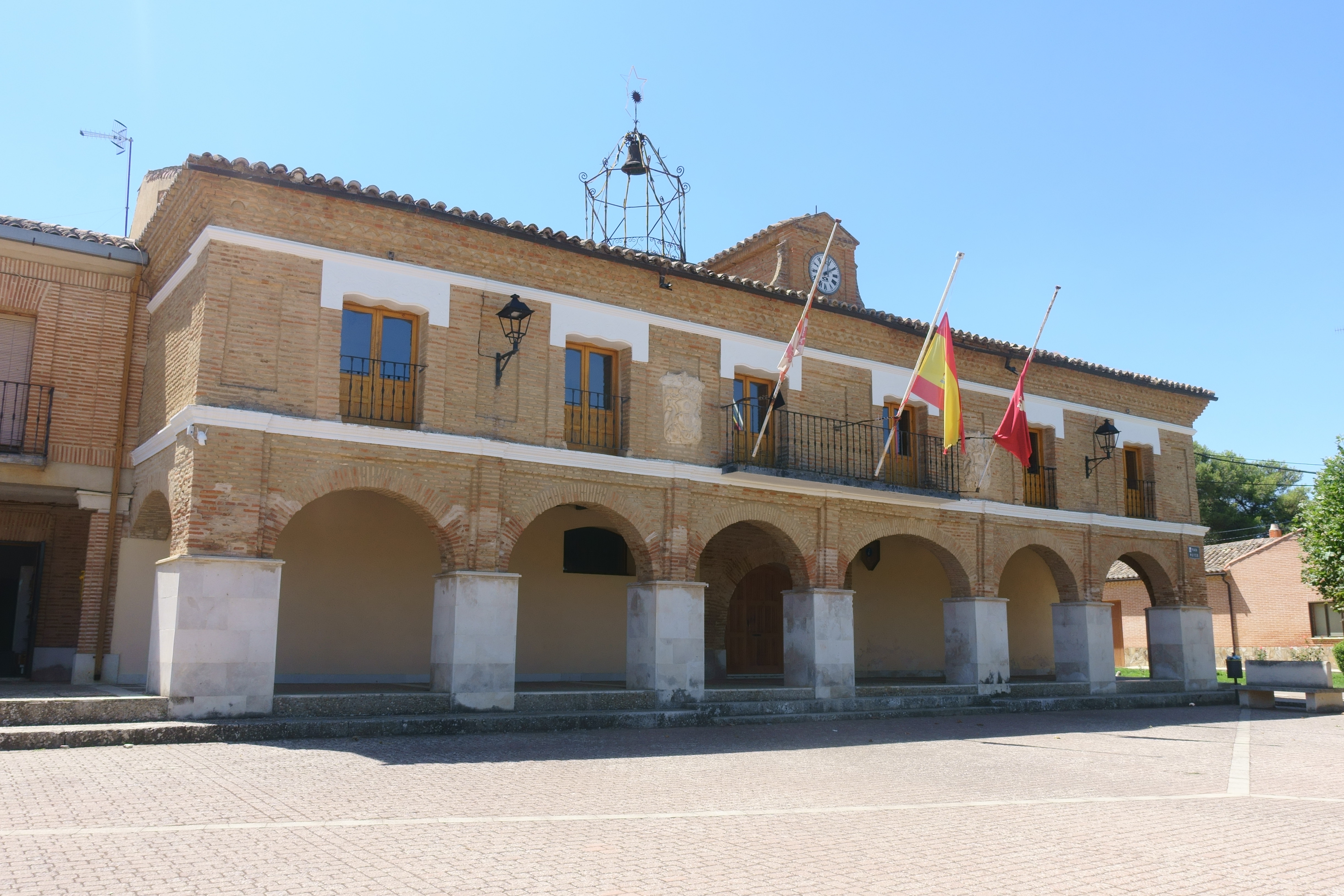
- Cuenca de Campos town hall

- Coat of arms

- Location of Cuenca de Campos within Spain
- Coordinates: 42°03′32″N 05°03′17″W
- Country: Spain
- Autonomous community: Castile and León
- Province: Valladolid
- Comarca: Tierra de Campos

Government
  - Alcalde: Faustino González (People's Party)

Area
  - Total: 47 km^{2} (18 sq mi)
- Elevation: 775 m (2,543 ft)

Population (2025-01-01)
  - Total: 179
  - Density: 3.8/km^{2} (9.9/sq mi)
- Demonym: Conquense
- Time zone: UTC+1 (CET)
  - Summer (DST): UTC+2 (CEST)
- Postal code: 47650
- Website: link

Cuenca de Campos is a municipality of Spain in the region of Tierra de Campos in Valladolid province, autonomous community of Castile and León. It covers an area of 47.93 square kilometres (18.51 sq mi) with a population of 272 inhabitants in 2012.

== Economy ==
Its economy is based on agriculture, cereals (wheat, barley, oats), and legumes (alfalfa and chickpeas), and livestock.
