= Itero del Castillo =

Coordinates: 42°17′N 4°14′W

- Municipality
- Flag Coat of arms
- Interactive map of Itero del Castillo
- Country: Spain
- Autonomous community: Castile and León
- Province: Burgos
- Comarca: Odra-Pisuerga

Area
  - Total: 17 km^{2} (6.6 sq mi)
- Elevation: 783 m (2,569 ft)

Population (2025-01-01)
  - Total: 74
  - Density: 4.4/km^{2} (11/sq mi)
- Time zone: UTC+1 (CET)
  - Summer (DST): UTC+2 (CEST)
- Postal code: 09107
- Website: http://www.iterodelcastillo.es/

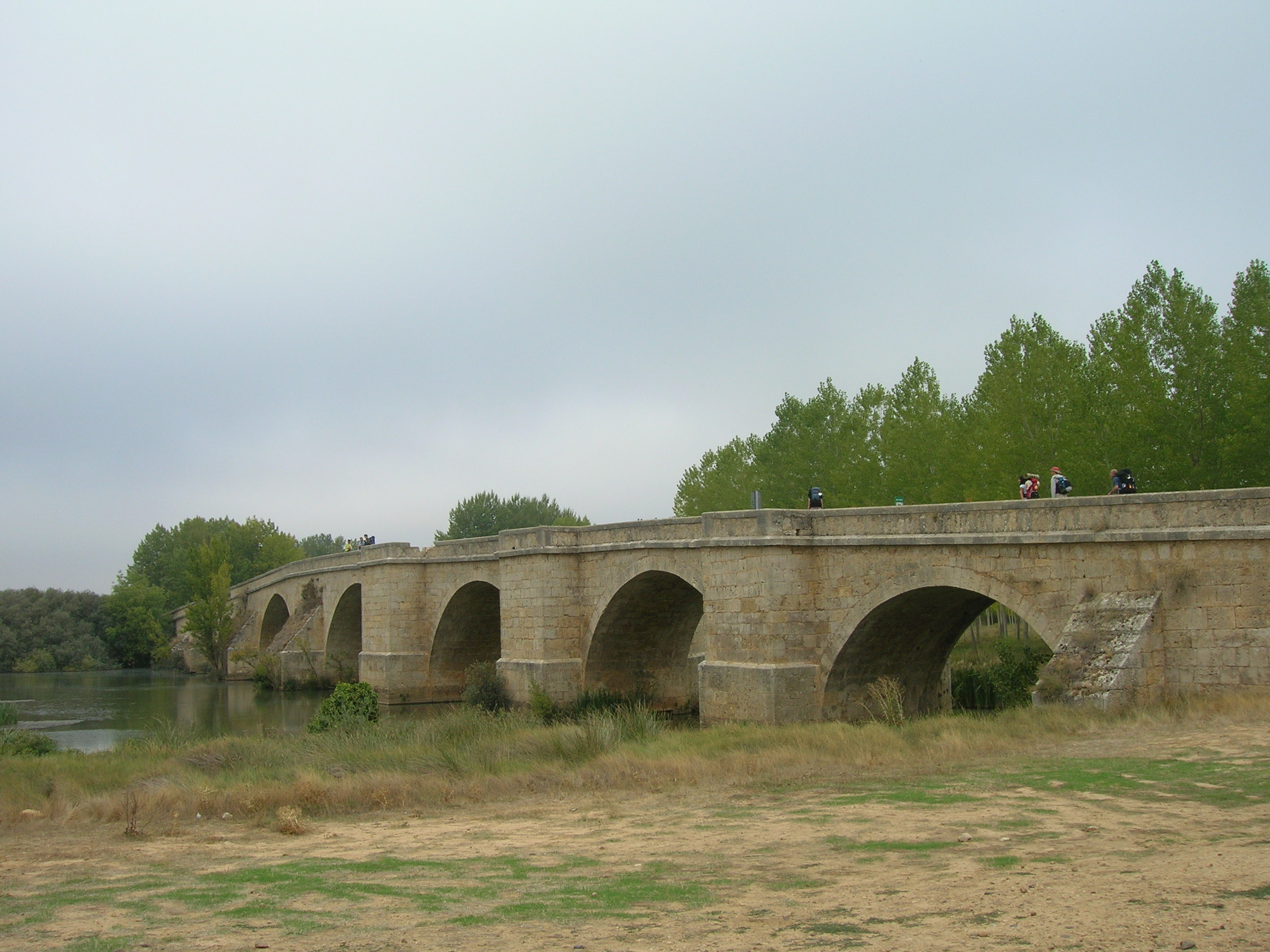
The bridge of Itero (puente de Itero) crosses the Pisuerga between Itero del Castillo (Burgos) and Itero de la Vega (Palencia). Beside it a hospital was constructed in the twelfth century by Nuño Pérez de Lara.

Itero del Castillo is a municipality located in the province of Burgos, Castile and León, Spain. According to the 2004 census (INE), the municipality has a population of 110 inhabitants.
