= Alférez =

High-ranking official in medieval Iberian royal household

In medieval Iberia, an alférez (Spanish: [alˈfeɾeθ], Galician: [alˈfeɾɪθ]) or alferes (Portuguese: [alˈfɛɾɨʃ], Catalan: [əlˈfeɾəs]) was a high-ranking official in the household of a king or magnate. The term is derived from the Arabic الفارس (al-fāris), meaning "knight" or "cavalier", and it was commonly Latinised as alferiz or alferis, although it was also translated into Latin as armiger or armentarius, meaning "armour-bearer". The connection with arms-bearing is visible in several Latin synonyms: fertorarius, inferartis, and offertor. The office was sometimes the same as that of the standard-bearer or signifer. The alférez was generally the next highest-ranking official after the majordomo. He was generally in charge of the king or magnate's mesnada (private army), his personal retinue of knights, and perhaps also of his armoury and his guard. He generally followed his lord on campaign and into battle.

The office of alférez originated in the tenth century. In the Kingdom of Navarre in the tenth and eleventh centuries, the office of alférez changed hands with higher frequency than others, and there is also evidence of rotation. It is the only courtly office for which two officers are cited at the same time: Fortún Jiménez and Ortí Ortiz were both inferartes in a charter of 1043. In the kingdoms of Castile and León in the eleventh and twelfth centuries the office was generally bestowed on young noble members of the court, often as a prelude to promotion to the rank of count. It is known that Alfonso VIII of Castile rewarded his alférez Álvaro Núñez de Lara with the grant of a village for carrying his standard in the Battle of Las Navas de Tolosa.

== List of alféreces ==
=== Navarre in the tenth and eleventh centuries ===
Name	First record in office	Final record in office	Title(s)
Fortún Jiménez	959	959	Armiger
Galindo Gómez	1030	1030	Armentarius
Fortún Jiménez	1043	1043	Inferartis
Ortí Ortiz	1043	1043	Inferartis
Galindo López	1044	1044	Offertor
Lope García	1058	1058	Alferiz
Lope García	1060	1060	Armiger
Jimeno García	1062	1064	Armiger
Fortún Iñíguez	1063	1063	Fertorarius
Lope Iñíguez	1063	1064	Fertorarius
Fortún Iñíguez	1063	1063	Fertorarius
García Fortúnez	1065	1071	Offertor, Fertorarius (1068), Tallator (1068–69)
Pedro García	1066	1072	Armiger
Lope Iñíguez	1066	1066	Offertor
Íñigo Sánchez	1072	1072	Alferiz
Fortún Iñíguez	1072	1087	Armiger
Íñigo Sánchez	1072	1076	Armiger
Sancho García	1072	1075	Offertor

=== León and Castile under Alfonso VII ===
Name	First record in office	Final record in office
Lope López	29 October 1123	29 July 1126
Tello Alfonso	9 March 1126	
García Garcés de Aza	12 December 1126	13 November 1127
Álvaro Gutiérrez	13 May 11128	
Pedro Alfonso	8 July 1129	10 June 1130
Rodrigo Fernández	26 August 1130	15 May 1131
Pedro Garcés	29 May 1131	28 September 1131
Gonzalo Peláez	22 November 1131	8 March 1132
Ramiro Fróilaz	29 May 1132	18 September 1133
Manrique Pérez de Lara	26 December 1134	2 June 1137
Diego Fróilaz	3 October 1137	26 June 1140
Ponce de Minerva	9 September 1140	19 December 1144
Nuño Pérez de Lara	March 1145	4 February 1155
Gonzalo de Marañón	7 February 1155	30 July 1157

Sources

- Simon Barton, The Aristocracy in Twelfth-century León and Castile (Cambridge, 1997), 144.

=== Alféreces in aristocratic households ===
Name of alférez	Date(s) of record	Title in record	Name of magnate
Alfonso Núñez	1 April 1101 x 24 October 1102		Count Raymond of Galicia
Íñigo Pérez	1103	armiger	Count Pedro Ansúrez
Gonzalo Peláez	1153		Count Manrique Pérez de Lara
García Díaz	1156		Count Manrique Pérez de Lara
