= Herrera de Pisuerga =

Coordinates: 42°36′N 4°20′W

- municipality
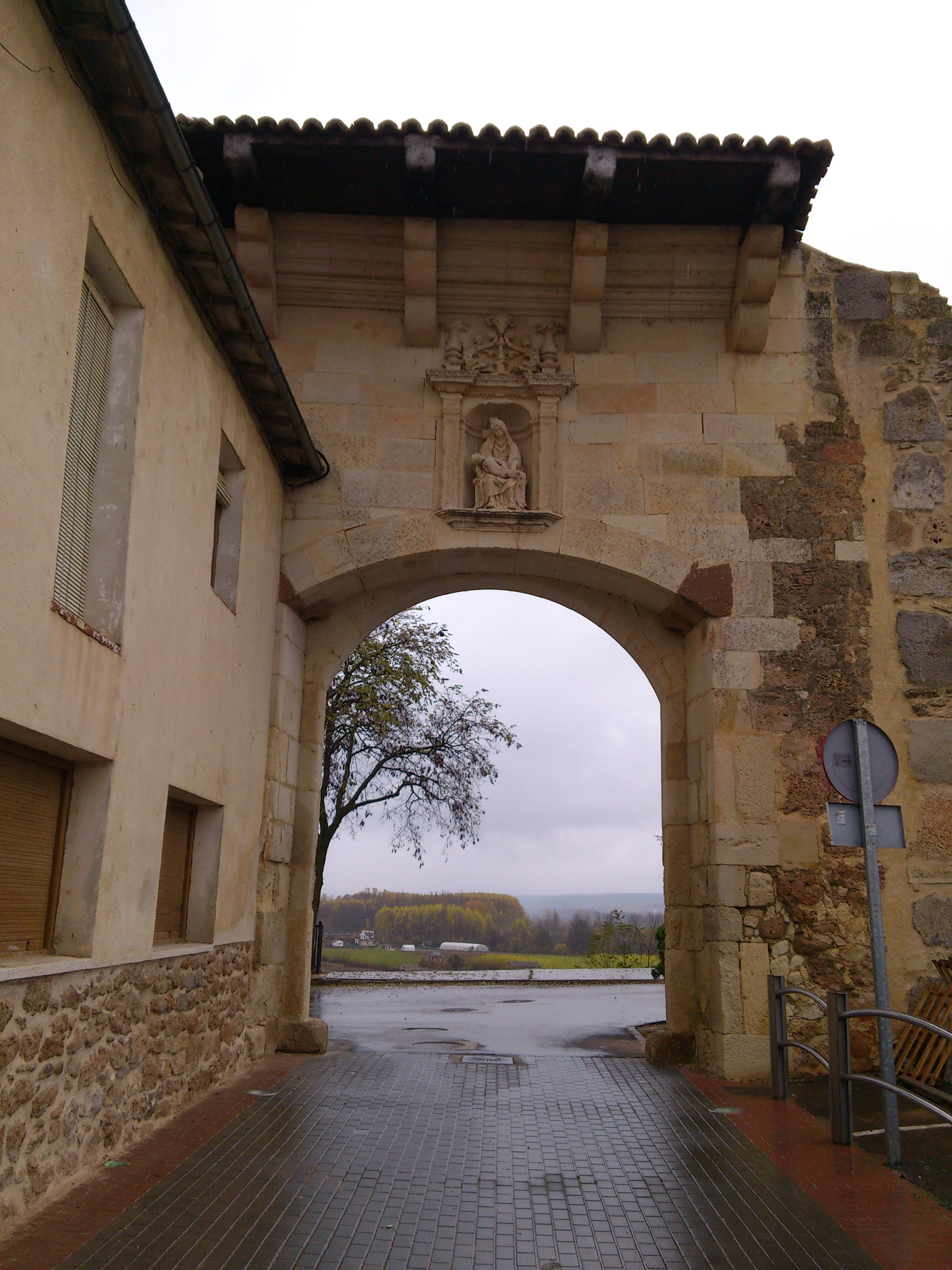

- Flag Coat of arms
- Interactive map of Herrera de Pisuerga
- Country: Spain
- Autonomous community: Castile and León
- Province: Palencia
- Municipality: Herrera de Pisuerga

Area
  - Total: 99 km^{2} (38 sq mi)

Population (2025-01-01)
  - Total: 1,875
  - Density: 19/km^{2} (49/sq mi)
- Time zone: UTC+1 (CET)
  - Summer (DST): UTC+2 (CEST)
- Website: Official website

Herrera de Pisuerga is a municipality located in the province of Palencia, Castile and León, Spain. It takes its name from the River Pisuerga.

According to the 2004 census (INE), the municipality had a population of 2,457 inhabitants.
