= Tamariz =

Tamariz is a surname. Notable people with the surname include:

- Carlos Cueva Tamariz (1898–1991), Ecuadorian politician, lawyer and university professor
- Ernesto Tamariz (1904–1988), Mexican sculptor
- Hugo Salazar Tamariz (1923–1999), Ecuadorian poet, novelist and playwright
- Juan Tamariz (born 1942), Spanish magician
