= Merindad de Río Ubierna =

Coordinates: 42°37′00″N 3°39′00″W

- Municipality
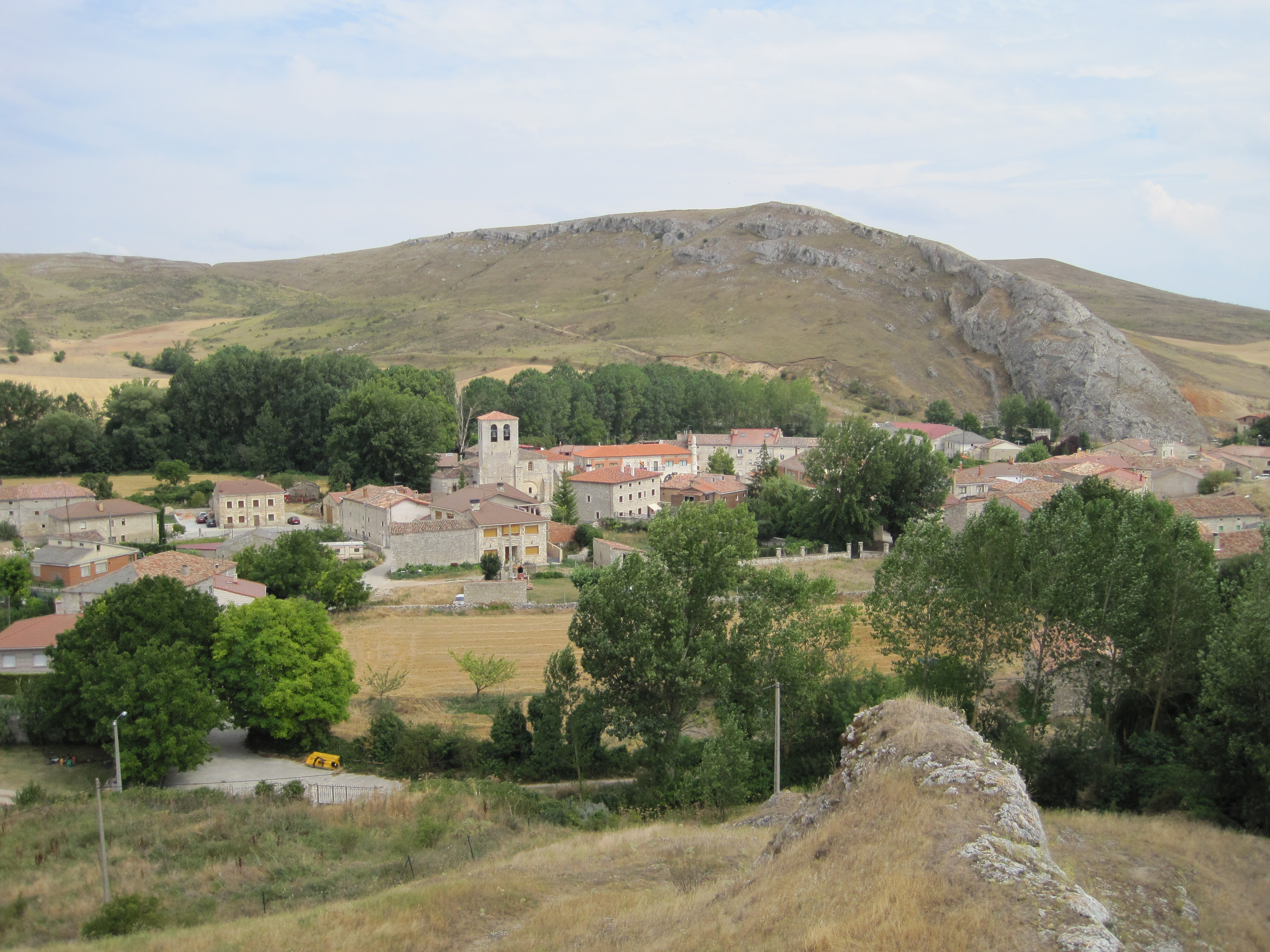

- Coat of arms
- Interactive map of Merindad de Río Ubierna
- Country: Spain
- Autonomous community: Castile and León
- Province: Burgos
- Comarca: Alfoz de Burgos
- Seat: Sotopalacios

Area
  - Total: 274 km^{2} (106 sq mi)
- Elevation: 856 m (2,808 ft)

Population (2025-01-01)
  - Total: 1,400
  - Density: 5.1/km^{2} (13/sq mi)
- Time zone: UTC+1 (CET)
  - Summer (DST): UTC+2 (CEST)
- Postal code: 09140
- Website: http://merindadrioubierna.com/

Merindad de Río Ubierna is a municipality located in the province of Burgos, Castile and León, Spain. According to the 2004 census (INE), the municipality has a population of 1,389 inhabitants. Its seat is in Sotopalacios.

== People from Merindad de Río Ubierna ==
- Andrés Díaz Venero de Leiva (?-1578) - Colonial governor of the New Kingdom of Granada.
