= Moratinos, Palencia =

Coordinates: 42°22′N 4°56′W

Moratinos
- municipality
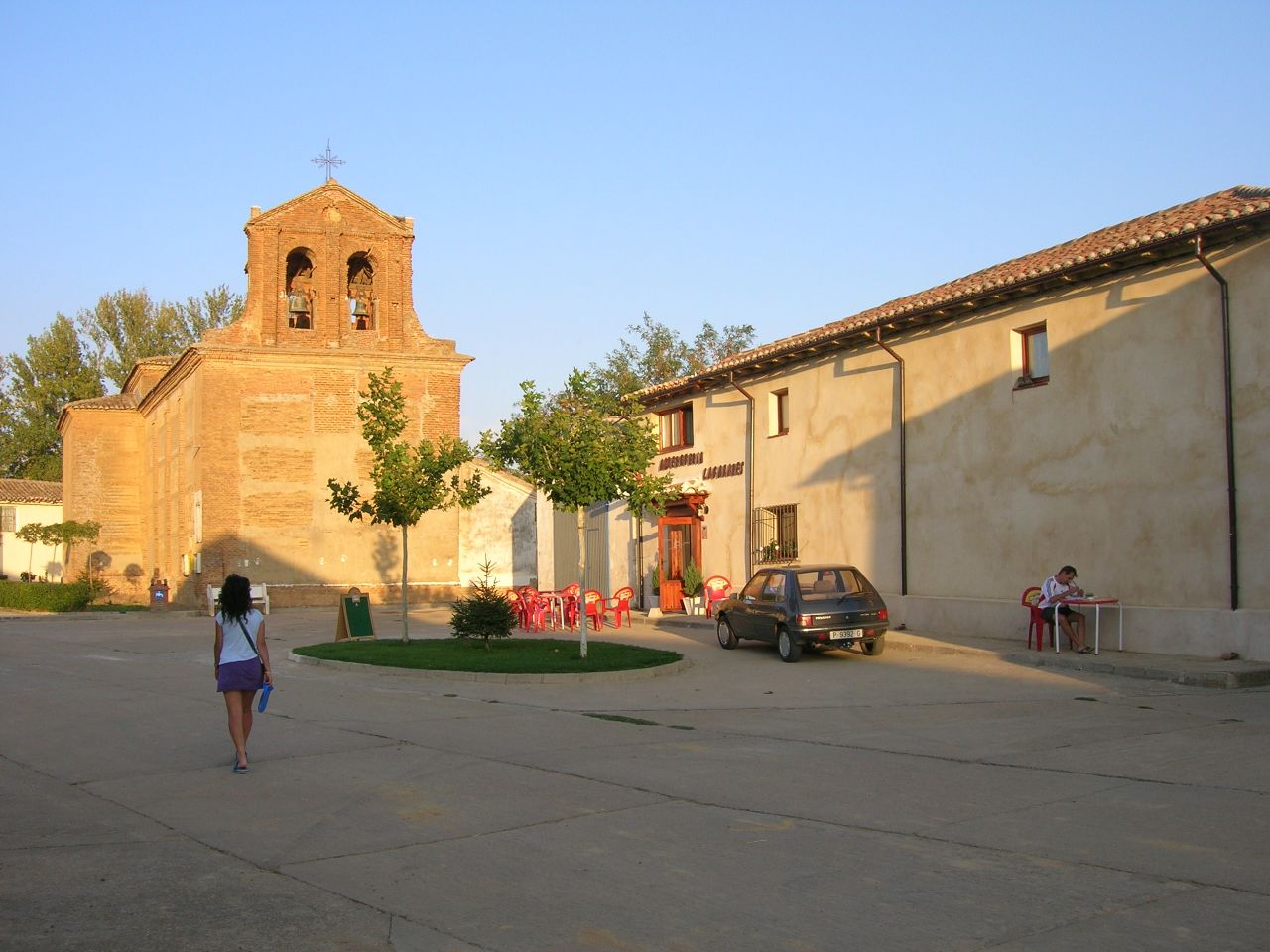
- Interactive map of Moratinos
- Country: Spain
- Autonomous community: Castile and León
- Province: Palencia
- Municipality: Moratinos

Area
  - Total: 29.4 km^{2} (11.4 sq mi)
- Elevation: 857 m (2,812 ft)

Population (2025-01-01)
  - Total: 55
  - Density: 1.9/km^{2} (4.8/sq mi)
- Time zone: UTC+1 (CET)
  - Summer (DST): UTC+2 (CEST)
- Website: Official website

Moratinos, is a town in Palencia, Spain which is located about 67 kilometers northwest of the capital of the province. It is best known to outsiders for "el castillo de Moratinos" (a.k.a. "Hobbiton"), an ages-old hill in the town center studded with family owned wine-storage caves.

As of 2002, Moratinos' population was listed at 78 people, but most registered residents live in cities and commute to Moratinos for weekends or festivals. In January 2015, 18 people lived in the town year-round. Most are farmers. Three are foreign-born immigrants who discovered Moratinos while walking the Camino de Santiago pilgrimage trail, which passes through the heart of the town.

Moratinos is notable in Palencia for its sudden growth in businesses. In 2010 a carpenter was the only businessman in town; in 2015 Moratinos was home to a hostel, a pilgrim's albergue, and a bar-restaurant. Weekly Mass is served at La Iglesia de Santo Tomas Apostol (18th century); the annual homecoming fiesta is held the third weekend of August.

Moratinos is home to historian Modesto Celada Vaquero and journalist Rebekah Scott.

Other villages in the municipality include San Nicolás del Real Camino
