= Stephanie Alfonso of Castile =

- Born: 1139 or 1148
- Died: 1 July 1180
- Burial: Basilica of San Isidoro
- Spouse: Fernando Rodríguez de Castro
- Issue: Pedro Fernández de Castro
- House: Castilian House of Ivrea
- Father: Alfonso VII of León and Castile
- Mother: Urraca Fernández de Castro

Stephanie Alfonso of Castile (Spanish: Estefanía Alfonso de Castilla) (1139/1148 – 1 July 1180) was an illegitimate daughter of Alfonso VII of León and Castile and Urraca Fernández de Castro, widow of Count Rodrigo Martínez, who was Urraca's cousin or uncle. Her murder by her husband, Fernando Rodríguez de Castro, earned her the sobriquet Stephanie the Unfortunate (Estefanía la Desdichada).

== Birth and Family ==
The wealthy and powerful Pedro Ansúrez's wife, Elyo Alfonso, was a relative of the sisters, Tegridia and Sancha Fernandez, the wife of the powerful Martín Flaínez. Another powerful nobleman, Fernando García de Hita had been married to either Tegridia Fernandez or Sancha and Martín's daughter Tegridia Martínez. Fernando García was the son of García II of Galicia, the son of Ferdinand II and Sancha of León. Tegridia died bearing her husband two sons, and Fernando then married Pedro Ansúrez's daughter María Pérez's daughter with Ermengol V, Count of Urgell, Stephanie of Urgell. Their daughter was Urraca Fernandez.

Urraca was married to Martín and Sancha's son (her uncle or cousin), Rodrigo Martínez, but he died. She then began a relationship with Alfonso VII, the son of Urraca of León, who in turn was the daughter of Alfonso VI of León, García II's brother, making Urraca and Alfonso VII second cousins.

Stephanie's date of birth must have occurred between 1139, when the relationship between Alfonso and her mother began, and 1148, the year in which Alfonso confers privileges in favor of Urraca and his daughter.

== Marriage ==
In 1157, Stephanie's father died while returning from an expedition and his kingdoms were partitioned between her legitimate half-brothers, Sancho III of Castile and Fernando II of León. Stephanie would marry Fernando Rodríguez de Castro, head of the House of Castro. Fernando's father was Urraca's half-brother (son of Fernando and Tegridia), Rodrigo Fernández de Castro. Nicknamed "the Lion" in his native Castile, he was exiled as a consequence of his family's struggles with the Lara family and joined the service of Ferdinand II in León, where he was dubbed "the Castilian". Ferdinand would name him governor, at different times, of Cuéllar, Dueñas, Valladolid, Toro and Asturias, and he eventually became Ferdinand's Mayordomo mayor. He had divorced his first wife, Constanza Osorio, daughter of Count Osorio Martinez, who was killed fighting Castro at the Battle of Lobregal in 1160. For his services, King Ferdinand rewarded him with Stephanie's hand, also granting them the infantazgo of León. She bore her husband a son, Pedro Fernández de Castro.

Don Fernando Ruiz de Castro
(Opening stanzas from a poem in El Drama Universal by Ramón de Campoamor, with translation.)

Mi esposa Estefanía, que está en gloria,
fue del Séptimo Alfonso hija querida;
desde hoy sabréis, al escuchar su historia,
que hay desgracias sin fin en nuestra vida.

Yo la maté celoso; y si, remiso,
no me maté también la noche aquella,
fue por matar después, si era preciso,
a todo el que, cual yo, dudase de ella.

My wife Estefanía, who is in glory, / was of Alfonso VII a dear daughter; / after today you will know, upon listening to this story, / that there are disgraces without end in our life. // Jealous, I killed her; and if, reluctant, / I did not kill myself also that night, / it was to kill later, if it was necessary, / all who, like me, doubted her.

== Death ==
On 1 July 1180, Stephanie was murdered by her husband, Fernando, who according to some sources listed, while others have left no record of the event, it is assumed that his wife had been unfaithful and murdered. When Fernando first heard about his wife's affair with an unknown man, he watched the lovers. He then later stabbed the man to death. Later, he entered the chambers of his wife and stabbed her to death. When Fernando realized what the situation had turned to, he begged for forgiveness from his brother-in-law the King. The King did not punish his brother-in-law for the murder.

Stephanie was buried in the basilica of San Isidoro de León. She left two young children.
