= Pedro Manrique de Lara =

Castilian nobleman and military leader (died 1202)

Pedro Manrique de Lara (died January 1202), commonly called Pedro de Molina or Peter of Lara, (Note: He is usually known in French sources as Pierre de Lara.) was a Castilian nobleman and military leader of the House of Lara. Although he spent most of his career in the service of Alfonso VIII of Castile, he also served briefly Ferdinand II of León (1185–86) and was Viscount of Narbonne by hereditary right after 1192. He was one of the most powerful Castilian magnates of his time, and defended the Kingdom of Toledo and the Extremadura against the Almohads. He also fought the Reconquista in Cuenca, and was a "second founder" of the monasteries of Huerta and Arandilla.

Pedro was married three times. By his first marriage, to a Navarrese princess, he forged a connection with the lineage of the folk hero El Cid, and scholars have suggested that Lara patronage lies behind the epic Poema de mio Cid. Pedro's second wife was a relative of Henry II of England. Pedro's trans-Pyrenean connexions explain his adoption of seals for authenticating documents; he is the first Spanish aristocrat from whom an examples survives. He also adopted the style "by the grace of God" to indicate his independence in ruling the lordship of Molina, which he inherited from his father.

== Inheritance ==
Pedro was the eldest son and heir of Manrique Pérez de Lara and Ermessinde, daughter of Aimery II of Narbonne. He regularly called himself "de Lara", a toponymic surname first employed by his grandfather and namesake Pedro González. Pedro's descendants adopted his own patronymic, Manrique, as part of their surname. Pedro's patrimony was extensive, but he is well known among historians for how much of it he mortgaged or sold for a small profit. This had led to the accusation that he was a poor administrator. He owned land at Cogolludo.

Pedro first appears in a public document on 18 December 1157. Pedro's father died at the Battle of Huete in the summer of 1164 and his semi-independent lordship of Molina was inherited by his widow, who promptly invested half of it in her eldest son. By November 1164 Pedro was governing the eastern fief of Atienza, which his father had held before his death. Dating to 1 March 1165 is the only document that cites Pedro as actually ruling Lara, from which his family took its name.

== First marriage ==
Pedro's first wife was the infanta Sancha Garcés, a daughter of King García Ramírez of Navarre and his second wife, Urraca, illegitimate daughter of Alfonso VII of León and Castile and his mistress Gontrodo Pérez. This was thus a highly auspicious match for the young nobleman. She first appears as his wife in a donation to the Praemonstratensian foundation at La Vid dated to 1165. This presents problems, however, as her first husband, Gaston V of Béarn, did not die until 1170. In May 1172, Pedro and his brother Manrique donated half of the saltworks (salinas) of Tercegüela to the abbey of Santa María de Huerta and Abbot Martín de Finojosa. In February 1173 Manrique along with Sancha donated the remaining half in exchange for a horse. This charter reads was "made in the month of February in the era 1211 in the year when King Sancho of Navarre gave his sister to count Pedro son of Manrique" (facta ... mense febrero in era M.CC.XI in anno quando rex Sancius Navarre dedit sororem suam comiti Petro filio comitis Almarica). This indicates that the marriage must have occurred sometime after February 1172, and as Sancha does not appear with her husband in the donation of May 1172, probably after that date as well.

Sancha and Pedro had three sons: García, Aimerico, and Nuño. Nuño, known as Nuño Pérez II to distinguish him from his great uncle, Nuño Pérez I, was still alive in 1228. He had received the tenencia of Bertabillo. Nuño Pérez I and Pedro Manrique shared the guardianship of the young Alfonso VIII before he attained his majority in 1169. British historian Richard A. Fletcher believed that Manrique, the Bishop of León from 1181 to 1205, was a son of Pedro and Sancha, although it is more likely that he was Pedro's brother.

Sancha was a great-granddaughter of Rodrigo Díaz de Vivar, called the Cid. It has been argued that the author of the Poema de mio Cid, perhaps Per Abbat, was patronised by the Lara family and that the Poema can be read as a work of escarnho e mal dizer ("shaming and cursing") against the Laras' enemies, the Castros (represented in the epic by the Infantes de Carrión). The town of San Esteban de Gormaz, nearby where the daughters of the Cid were beaten and abandoned, was also the site where the Laras, led by Pedro's father, hid the young Alfonso VIII in 1163; and the favourable light shone on Avengalvón, the last Muslim ruler of Molina (which fell to the Christians shortly before 1138), may reflect his relationship with the later Lara rulers of the same.

== Military governor of the southern frontier ==
By 1 September 1166 Pedro was a count (comes in Latin), the highest dignity to which a Castilian nobleman of his time could be appointed by the king. He regularly titled himself Dei gratia, "by the grace of God", a rare usage for a nobleman in twelfth-century Spain, perhaps borrowed from his Occitan or Catalan cousins. There is also an example of his use of the phrase munere divino ("by divine mercy"). In 1168 he was sent to govern the tenencias of Osma and San Esteban de Gormaz in eastern Castile. On 4 October that year he made a donation to the parish church of Molina.

Pedro was a regular patron of the military order of the Knights of Calatrava. He made his first donatio to them on 8 May 1169. In 1169 Pedro intervened to arbitrate a dispute between the settlers of Molina and the Abbey of Huerta concerning the boundaries of the village of Arandilla.

In June 1170 Pedro was the governor (or tenant, tenens) of the militarily important frontier zone of Extremadura. On 5 November 1172 he was cited as governing Cabezón. By 3 April 1173 Pedro was governing the Kingdom of Toledo, the region centred on the populous city of Toledo and bordering al-Andalus to the south. That year, when Alfonso VIII invaded Navarre as far as Pamplona, Pedro acted as a mediator between his sovereign and the king of Navarre, Sancho VI, his brother-in-law. The war ended in a treaty in October.

In 1177, Pedro took part in the conquest of Cuenca. On 19 August, during the siege, Cerebruno, Archbishop of Toledo, purchased Pedro's lands at Añover and Barcilés for 100 maravedíes. The size and sophistication of Pedro Manrique's own court and mesnada (private army) is indicated by his employment of a majordomo (maiordomus) of his own, Pedro Vidas, in 1177.

== Use of seals ==
The earliest surviving aristocratic wax seal from Spain is found hanging from a document of Pedro's dated 22 January 1179. Since this practice was already current in France, it is probable that it entered Spain through the Laras' connexions with Narbonne and was certainly influenced by Occitan and Catalan designs. It may have been made from a matrix cast as early as 1164, when Pedro succeeded his father in Molina. This is the only surviving example of Pedro's seal and, although heavily worn, its image is describable:

It depicts a knight, protected by a conical helmet and a long kite-shaped shield, mounted upon a galloping charger and brandishing a lance. This, without any shadow of a doubt, was how Count Pedro wished to present himself to the world: warlike, puissant, unstoppable; a warrior aristocrat indeed.

The seal is double-sided, both sides bearing equestrian depictions of Pedro. The obverse bears the barely discernible legend "seal of count Pedro", and the reverse and indiscernible legend that appears to be a sentence or motto. This would be the earliest of only three examples of personal seals from medieval Spain bearing mottoes. The charter to which it was attached put the village of Torralba de Ribota, which belonged to the mother church at Calatayud of the Canons of the Holy Sepulchre in Spain, under the protection of Pedro Dei gratia comes, "by the grace of God count". It was confirmed in the city of Calatayud on Saint Vincent's Day in the year 1217 of the Spanish era. The identification with Pedro Manrique is secure, since there was neither another count named Pedro in Castile at the time nor any other count using the style Dei gratia. Pedro was at Torralba in March 1179. On 20 March Pedro assisted Alfonso VIII in laying the foundation stone of the Abbey of Huerta.

== Relations with religious houses ==
On 11 February 1172 Pedro received half the vill of Beteta from Cathedral of Santa María in Sigüenza in exchange for the monastery of Santa María de Molina. On 2 May Pedro made a donation to the Cistercian monastery at Sacramenia. On 17 May he made another donation to a Cistercian house, this time the Abbey of Huerta. Although he made donations to the Praemonstratensians and the Benedictines (the monastery of Arlanza on an unknown date), the Cistercians were his preferred monastic order. The Cistercian historian Ángel Manrique in his Annales Cistercienses (II, 429) considers Pedro and his descendants, the Manriques de Lara, as the "second founders" of Huerta because of their numerous benefactions.

On 26 June 1176 Pedro made a donation to the regular clergy of Alcalech. In October 1176 he made an apparently pious donation to the cathedral of Sigüenza, for this time he received nothing in return. On 16 January 1178 he made his second donation to the parish of Molina.

On 1 January 1181 Pedro and his sister María granted the vill of Carabanchel, on the outskirts of Madrid, to a certain Gonzalo Díaz and his wife Melisenda. The vill had been mortgaged for 100 maravedíes by Ermessinde of Narbonne. Later that year (28 June) Pedro pledged 2,000 maravedíes for the construction of a monastery at Arandilla, which had lain in his jurisdiction since at least 1169. Besides the money, not only did Pedro offer land for the building of an abbey, he also granted the monks of Huerta (who were to build it) some four hundred sheep, forty cows, and ten mares. Pedro also instructed that he was to be buried at Arandilla if work on the monastery had not been finished by the time of his death, and that his successor was to donate a further 3,000 maravedíes. As early as 14 March 1167 Pedro's mother had attempted to establish a monastery there. She gave the usufruct of her estates at Arandilla to the monks of Huerta for two years on that date, and also promised them some properties at Molina. Ermessinde further pledged 200 gold pieces per annum for the erection of a monastery at Arandilla, offering even to pay the salary of the master builder who would supervise its construction. No monastery was every built at Arandilla, nor was Pedro buried there. It is not clear why the project failed.

On 11 March 1183, Pedro and his eldest son, García, made a donation to the Order of Calatrava for the good of the soul of his first wife, the latter's mother, the infanta Sancha. Pedro, with his sister María, made another donation to Calatrava that same month, letting go the castle of Alcozar. On 23 April he made a further pious donation (of two houses) to the Cathedral of Santa María in Burgos. Some time in 1183 Pedro and María mortgaged their joint property of the vill and castle of Los Ausines to the monastery of La Vid for 1,000 maravedíes.

== Member of the Leonese court and second marriage ==
Pedro is last seen ruling Toledo in May 1179. On 8 May 1181 Pedro was governing Hita. On 28 June that year he made a donation to Huerta, his third. Also in June 1179 Pedro rewarded one of his loyal followers, García de Alberit, and the latter's daughter Toda and brother Pascasio with land at Valtablado.

Pedro took as his second wife Margaret (Margarita, Margerina). The couple first appears as married in a charter redacted at Angers and preserved in the cartulary of Llanthony Secunda, recording the gift of bridewealth to a certain Margaret, relative of Henry II of England, by her husband, Petrus Dei gratia comes de Lara. The properties granted were Molmera (perhaps Molina), Andaluz, Agusino, Eles, and Polvoranca. It is dated "the tenth kalends of February of the Era 1221" (x kal′ februarii Era(t) m cc xxi), that is, 23 January 1183 according to Evans, but Church says of it, "Dated 23 January, it must have been granted in either 1184, 1185 or 1186." This charter is the only evidence to hint at Margaret's origin. (Note: There are several hypotheses regarding her parentage. Evans, 187–91, based on the attested kinship to Henry and the association with Llanthony Segunda, a foundation of the English Gloucester family, proposed she was Margaret of Huntingdon, a member of the royal house of Scotland, and from late 1181 the widow of Humphrey III de Bohun, heir to the Gloucesters. However, she was recorded as a widow in the Rotuli dominabus in 1185/6 (Everard and Jones, 94). Sánchez de Mora, 328–29, suggests she may have been either Margaret de Bohun, sister of Humphrey III, or Margaret, daughter of Hamelin de Warenne, Earl of Surrey, king Henry's half-brother, though most scholars do not assign him such a daughter.) They made another donation to the Order of Calatrava in which she was cited as "countess (comitissa) Margaret" on 30 December 1187 (or perhaps 1186). (Note: The document contains conflicting dating: "Era M.CC.XXV. III. KL Januarii" in the Spanish Era, "anno quo rex Aldefonsus Coanca coepit". Since Cuenca was taken in 1177, Lara family historian Luis de Salazar y Castro dated this charter to 30 December 1177 (Salazar y Castro, 15), but Sánchez de Mora, 328–29, notes: El documento lleva la fecha de 1187, aunque está datado "anno quo rex Aldefonsus Coanca coepit", de ahí que Salazar lo sitúe en 1177. No obstante, la lista de testigos parece indicar que fue redactado en los años ochenta, quizás en 1186, pues el cambio de año se producia el 25 de diciembre. (The document bears the date of 1187, although it is dated anno quo Aldefonsus rex Coanca coepit, which is why Salazar places it in 1177. However, the list of witnesses seems to indicate that it was written in the 1180s, maybe in 1186, since the year changed on December 25.)) The couple was still married on 17 November 1189 when they made another donation to Calatrava. She gave him no known children.

On 27 January 1185 Pedro witnessed his first charter as a member of the court of Ferdinand II of León. By 11 February he had been appointed mayordomo mayor del rey (majordomo), the highest-ranking official at court. This appointment could not have lasted much more than a week, for Ferdinand had returned the former official, Rodrigo López, to the office by 16 February. By that time, however, Pedro had been appointed to a post away from court: the large and important, if quiet, tenencia of Asturias de Oviedo. His tenencias steadily increased throughout the year. By 22 February he was governing the "towers of León", that is, the royal citadel that controlled the capital city; by 6 July he held Salamanca and Toro, the latter only briefly; and by 26 September he was holding Ciudad Rodrigo, an important city in the south of the kingdom. On 4 March 1186 Pedro was styled a "vassal of king Ferdinand" (uassallo regis Fernandi). There is an isolated reference to his governing Babia on 16 March and Luna on 31 March–1 April. He continued to govern Asturias de Oviedo, Ciudad Rodrigo, and Salamanca until at least 5 May that year. He held onto León a short while longer, for he was still in charge of the fortress there on 21 May.

On 29 January 1187 Pedro made a second donation to Alcalech (his first had been in 1176). From 1188 until 1200 Pedro was ruling the region of Cuenca. After 1190 Pedro no longer held Atienza. Beginning in that year he ruled Huete, where his father had been killed in battle. His rule there lasted until at least 21 March 1198. On 13 June 1195 Pedro made a second donation to the cathedral of Sigüenza.

== Viscount of Narbonne ==
Pedro seems to have been second in line to the viscounty of Narbonne, since his aunt, the viscountess Ermengarde, was childless. Pedro's brother Aimerico Manrique de Lara was invited to co-rule with Ermengarde, but on his death in 1177 the viscountess again ruled alone, at least until 1184. In that year the abbot of Fontfroide, the abbey where Aimerico was buried, donated the hamlet of Terrail to the Archbishop of Narbonne, Bernard Gaucelin. The archbishop solicited a confirmation of this acquisition of territory within the viscounty from "Ermengarde, viscountess of Narbonne, and from you, Count Pedro, and from your successors," which suggests the presence of Pedro Manrique north of the Pyrenees and that his aunt had recognised him as her heir. The confirmation was duly received from Ermengarde, "by the grace of God, viscountess of Narbonne, and my relative Pedro, by the same grace count." This demonstrates that on the other side of the Pyrenees Pedro continued to style himself and be styled as a count, as in "Count Pedro, Viscount of Narbonne".

In 1192 on the abdication of his aunt (died 1197), Pedro succeeded in the viscounty of Narbonne. On 28 April 1194 he, "in consideration of the good", named his second son, Aimerico, as his heir there, and may have invested him with the viscounty. Aimerico remained behind in it, for he did not return to Castile until after Pedro's death in 1202. Besides the viscounty, Pedro also inherited suzerainty over the viscounts of Béziers, which he included in his cession to his son of 1194. Excepted was the castle of Montpesat, which Pedro retained under his control.

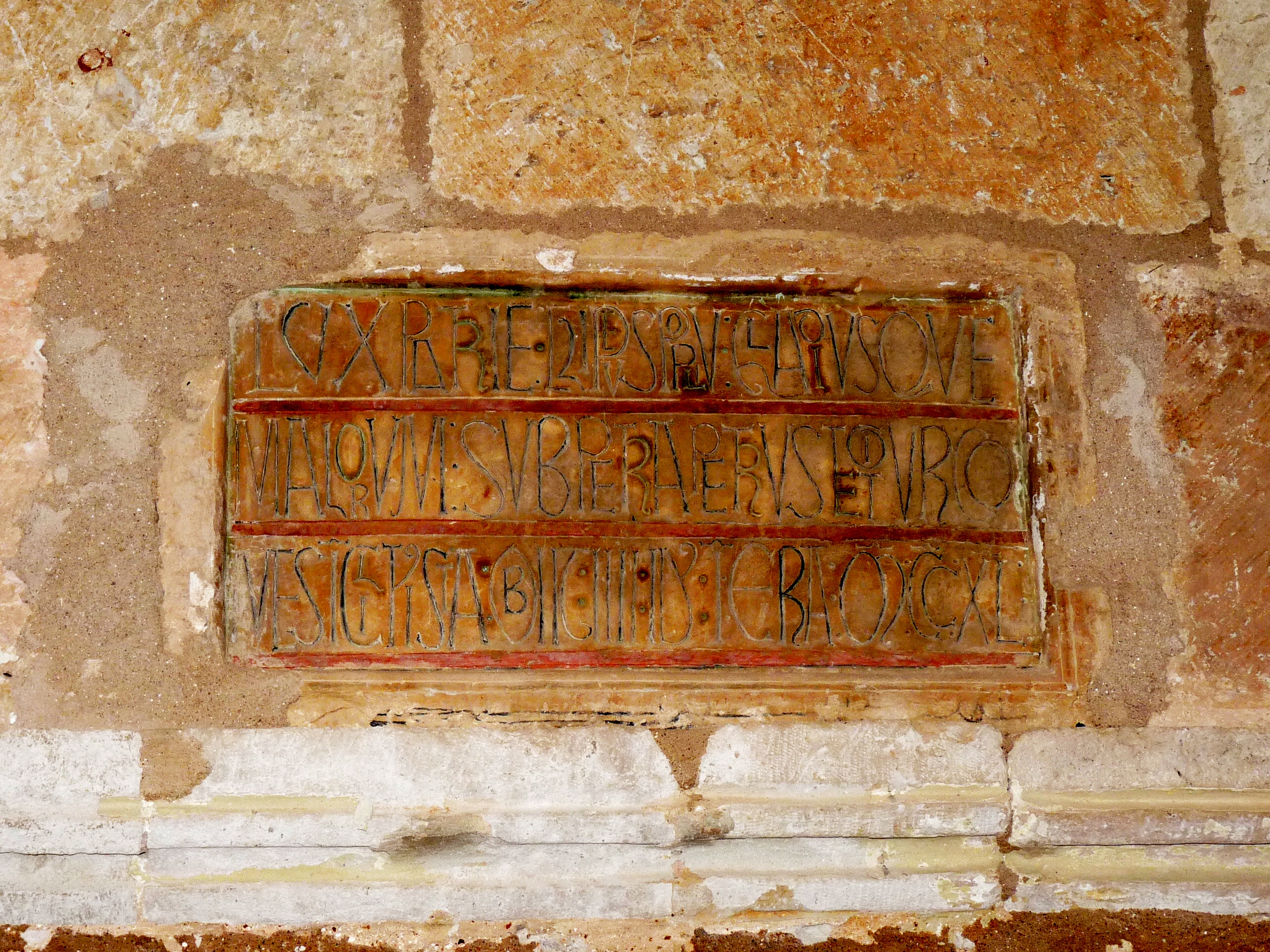
Inscription on the wall of the Pantheon of the Counts of Molina at the cloister of the Monastery of Santa María de Huerta

== Death and legacy ==
In April 1199 Pedro was present at Huerta when it was visited by Alfonso VIII, the occasion for which the Poem de mio Cid may have first been publicly recited. On 30 October 1199 he made his second donation to La Vid. In September 1200 he may have been present at Ariza when Peter II of Aragon received the local castle from his mother, Sancha.

Pedro's last appearance at court was on 11 December 1201. He died early in 1202 and was buried in the abbey of Huerta, next to his first wife under the first stone archway of the cloister, on 14 January, according to the Anales toledanos primeros. On 29 July 1203 the Cistercian monastery at Piedra received properties promised it in Pedro's will.

Although there is no further mention of Pedro's second wife, Margaret, after their joint donation to Calatrava on 17 November 1189, his third and final wife (and widow), Mafalda, is not mentioned until after his death, on 3 February 1202, when she and her eldest son by Pedro, Gonzalo, sold their estate at Tragacete to the city council of Cuenca for 4,000 maravedíes. She also had by Pedro a son named Rodrigo or Ruy, who in the 1190s joined his father at the royal court and became merino mayor. He also became the lord of Montpesat.

== Bibliography ==
- Simon Barton. The Aristocracy in Twelfth-century León and Castile. Cambridge: Cambridge University Press, 1997.
- José María Canal Sánchez-Pagín. "Casamientos de los condes de Urgel en Castilla". Anuario de estudios medievales, 19 (1989), 119–35.
- Fredric L. Cheyette. Ermengard of Narbonne and the World of the Troubadours. Ithaca: Cornell University Press, 2001.
- Stephen Church. King John and the Road to Magna Carta. New York: Basic Books, 2015.
- José María de Corral. "Santa María de Rocamador y la milagrosa salvación de una Infanta de Navarra en el siglo XII". Hispania, 7:29 (1947), 554–610.
- Simon R. Doubleday. The Lara Family: Crown and Nobility in Medieval Spain. Cambridge, Massachusetts: Harvard University Press, 2001.
- Joseph J. Duggan. The Cantar de Mio Cid: Poetic Creation in Its Economic and Social Contexts. Cambridge: Cambridge University Press, 1989.
- Charles Evans. "Margaret of Scotland, Duchess of Brittany." Mélanges offerts à Szalbocs de Vajay à l'occasion de son cinquantième anniversaire, edd. Le comte de'Adhémar de Panat, Xavier de Ghellinck Vaernewyck and Pierre Brière. Braga: 1971.
- Judith Everard and Michael Jones, eds. The Charters of Duchess Constance of Brittany and her Family, 1171–1221. London: Boydell and Brewer, 1999.
- Richard A. Fletcher. The Episcopate in the Kingdom of León in the Twelfth Century. Oxford: Oxford University Press, 1978.
- Julio González. "Repoblación de las tierras de Cuenca". Anuario de estudios medievales, 12 (1982), 183–204.
- Elaine Graham-Leigh. The Southern French Nobility and the Albigensian Crusade. Woodbridge: The Boydell Press, 2005.
- Hilda Grassotti. "El sitio de Cuenca en la mecánica vasallático-señorial de Castilla". Anuario de estudios medievales, 12 (1982), 33–40. Originally published in Cuadernos de Historia de España, 63–64 (1980), 112–19.
- María Eugenia Lacarra. El Poema de mio Cid: realidad histórica e ideología. Madrid: Ediciones José Porrúa Turanzas, 1980.
- Faustino Menéndez Pidal de Navascués. "Los sellos de los señores de Molina". Anuario de estudios medievales, 14 (1984), 101–119.
- Derek E. T. Nicholson. The Poems of the Troubadour Peire Rogier. Manchester: Manchester University Press, 1976.
- Luis de Salazar y Castro. Pruebas de la historia de la Casa de Lara. Madrid: Imprenta Real, 1694.
- Antonio Sánchez de Mora. La nobleza castellana en la plena Edad Media: el linaje de Lara (SS. XI–XIII). Doctoral Thesis, University of Seville, 2003.
- Colin Smith. The Making of the Poema de mio Cid. Cambridge: Cambridge University Press, 1983.
