= Fernando Rodríguez de Castro =

Castilian nobleman (1125–1185)

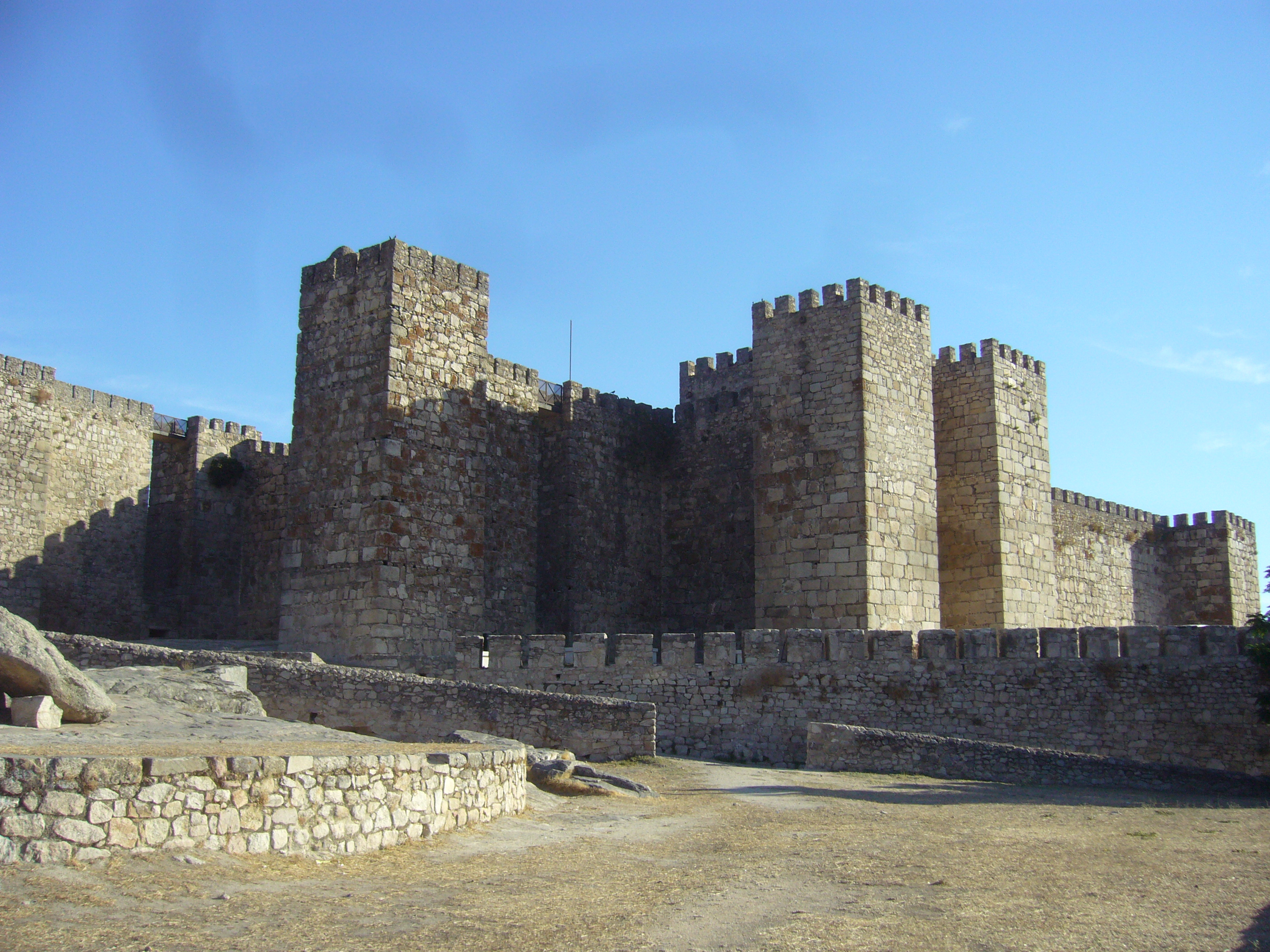
Castle at Trujillo, which Fernando conquered from Portugal and made the centre of his lordship

Fernando Rodríguez (Note: His first name may also be given as Fernán and his patronymic as Ruiz. In Latin his name is Ferdinandus Roderici.) de Castro (1125–1185) was a Castilian nobleman, statesman and military leader who made his career in León. He was the leader of the House of Castro during the civil wars that followed the death of Sancho III of Castile and the succession of the infant Alfonso VIII. He was nicknamed el Castellano ("the Castilian") in León and el Leonés ("the Leonese") in Castile.

== Life ==
Fernando was the eldest son of Rodrigo Fernández de Castro and his wife, Eilo Álvarez. He led the Castro family in their dispute with the House of Lara over the custody and regency of the young Alfonso VIII after Sancho III's death in August 1158. Early in 1160 the Laras managed to exile him to the court of Ferdinand II of León. He returned to Castile in March with an army and defeated the Laras at the Battle of Lobregal, where his erstwhile father-in-law, Osorio Martínez, was killed fighting alongside his enemies, and Nuño Pérez de Lara was captured. Nonetheless, he was unable to reestablish himself in his homeland. Shortly after 1160, with a mixed force of Christians and Muslims, Fernando besieged the recently founded city of Ciudad Rodrigo. Ferdinand II, with the militias of Salamanca and Zamora, came to its relief. Fernando was soon reconciled to the king of León, who appointed him governor first of Cuéllar, Dueñas, Salamanca, Toro, Valladolid, and Zamora, and later of Asturias and Benavente. He served Ferdinand II as mayordomo mayor del rey (majordomo), the highest court official in power, on two occasions: between 15 August 1162 and 6 September 1164 and between 19 October 1165 and 15 May 1166. In 1162 Ferdinand II conquered Toledo from Castile and placed it in the hands of Fernando Rodríguez as governor. Toledo remained a Leonese possession until 1166. In 1164 Fernando returned to Castile a second time with an army and killed Manrique Pérez de Lara in the Battle of Huete (June/July). In 1168 he was appointed alcalde in the city of León, and controlled the city's fortifications (tenente turris Legionis, "held the towers of León") until 1182.

In the early summer of 1169, the Portuguese freebooter Gerald the Fearless took the city of Badajoz after a long siege, but the garrison took refuge in the alcazaba, the siege of which continued. Seeing an opportunity to add to his domains the chief city of the region at the expense of both his Muslim and Christian enemies, Afonso I of Portugal came with an army to Badajoz to relieve Gerald. This provoked the opposition of Ferdinand of León, who claimed Badajoz as his own and came south with an army at the request of the Almohad caliph Abu Yaqub Yusuf, who had already sent a contingent of 500 cavalry to assist the garrison. Fernando Rodríguez, then majordomo, was one of the Leonese leaders on this expedition. The besieging Portuguese were themselves besieged by the Leonese and fighting broke out in the streets. While trying to flee, Afonso was caught on the hinge of a gate and flung from his horse, breaking his leg. He was captured by Ferdinand's men, while Fernando captured Gerald. After the mêlée the Leonese had control of the town and the alcazaba, which they soon relinquished to their Muslim allies. Several of Gerald's conquests were ceded to purchase his freedom. Ferdinand retained Cáceres, but Trujillo, Montánchez, Santa Cruz de la Sierra, and Monfragüe he gave to Fernando Ruiz. Fernando thus established a semi-independent lordship between the Tagus and Guadiana rivers, with his seat at Trujillo. In 1171 he was granted the infantaticum of León. Between 1172 and 1175 Fernando held Mayorga and Melgar de Arriba from the Crown, both had been fiefs of Osorio Martínez. He was for the remainder of his career a frequent attendee at both the Leonese and Castilian courts. The Annales compostellani record Fernando's death in the year 1185, sometime after August 16.

== Marriages ==
Fernando's first wife was Constance (Constanza) Osorio, daughter of count Osorio Martínez killed at Lobregal. The couple had probably separated before the Battle of Lobregal. In February 1165 Constance married Pedro Arias de Limia as his second wife. In 1168 Fernando married his cousin Estefanía Alfonso la Desdichada ("Stephanie the Unfortunate", born 1148), an illegitimate daughter of Alfonso VII and his mistress Urraca Fernández. They had a son, Pedro. On 1 July 1180 Fernando murdered her out of jealousy. She was buried in the monastery of San Isidoro de León. Her murder is the subject of a poem, "Don Fernando Ruiz de Castro", in El Drama Universal by Ramón de Campoamor, the opening stanzas of which are:

Mi esposa Estefanía, que está en gloria,
fue del Séptimo Alfonso hija querida;
desde hoy sabréis, al escuchar su historia,
que hay desgracias sin fin en nuestra vida.

Yo la maté celoso; y si, remiso,
no me maté también la noche aquella,
fue por matar después, si era preciso,
a todo el que, cual yo, dudase de ella.

Translation:

My wife Estefanía, who is in glory,
was of Alfonso VII a dear daughter;
after today you will know, upon listening to this story,
that there are misfortunes without end in our life.

Jealous, I killed her; and if, reluctant,
I did not kill myself also that night,
it was to kill later, if it was necessary,
all who, even I, doubted her.

Fernando also had an illegitimate son, Martín, by a woman named María Íñiguez, who is named in a document of Martín's son Pedro dated 1241.
