= Aimery III of Narbonne =

Viscount of Narbonne (died 1239)

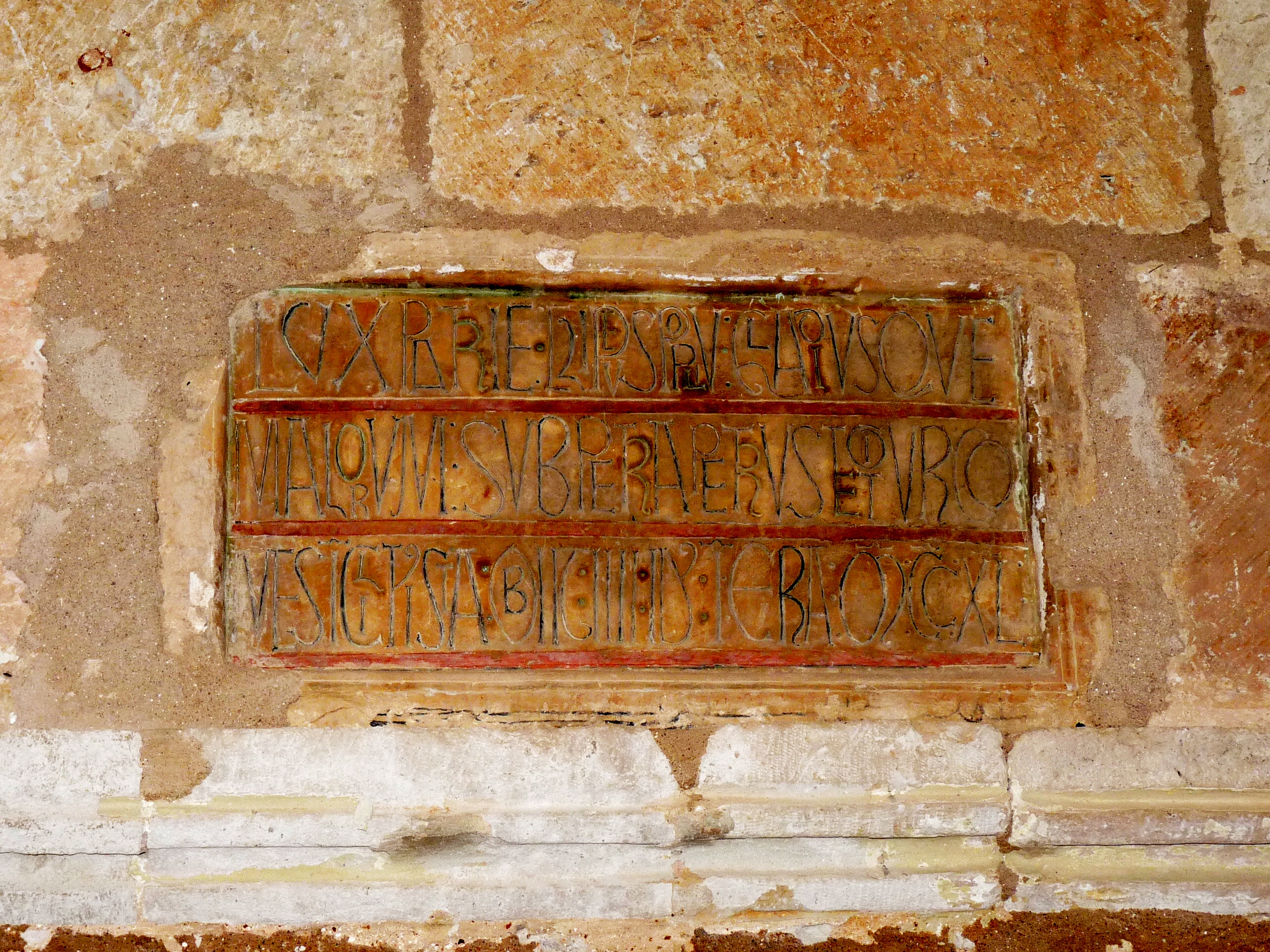
Inscription in the abbey of Huerta praising its founder, Pedro Manrique, and recording his death in 1202. Aimery visited the monastery that year to confirm his father's grants to it. The inscription may have been set up during his visit.

Aimery (or Aimeric) III (died February 1239), known in Spanish as Aimerico Pérez de Lara, was the Viscount of Narbonne from 1194 until his own death. He was a member of the House of Lara. Throughout his reign he had to navigate competing claims of suzerainty over him and until 1223 his reign was dominated by the Occitan War. He participated unenthusiastically on the side of the crusaders, but retained his viscounty, which he passed on to his son.

== Aimery and his father ==
On the abdication of Viscountess Ermengard in 1192, her nephew and heir, Pedro Manrique de Lara, a nobleman from Castile, travelled to Narbonne to receive the viscounty and then bestow it on his second son, Aimery, along with the suzerainty over the Viscount of Béziers (1194). Only the castle of Montpesat and its vicinity was reserved for Pedro as a foothold north of the Pyrenees. Aimery immediately recognised the suzerainty of Count Raymond V of Toulouse and received the homage of his own vassals.

In 1202, shortly after the death of his father, Aimery visited the Abbey of Huerta, which Pedro had founded, in Castile. There he confirmed all the gifts and concessions made by his father and decreed that if he were to die south of the Pyrenees he wished to be buried at Huerta. In the charter he had drawn up to confirm the abbey's possessions he styled himself a "son of the lord count Pedro and the lady infanta Sancha, by the grace of God viscount of Narbonne." The title infanta used of his mother connected Aimery to royalty by identifying his mother as a royal princess, the daughter of King García Ramírez of Navarre. The formula "by the grace of God" indicated his claim of a divine right to rule and its use was initiated in his family by his father.

Upon his return to France, Aimery swore fealty to Raymond V for all the lands of Narbonne, including Montpesat, which he had inherited, and all the other lands which Pedro had given to the count and received back as fiefs. This act by Pedro had probably ensured Toulousain acceptance of his son's accession.

== Crusades in southern France and Spain ==
In 1209 the Albigensian Crusade (“Occitan War”) visited the south of France. Pressured by Odo III, Duke of Burgundy, and Hervé, Count of Nevers, the viscount of Narbonne bowed to a Papal command and assisted the crusaders with money, supplies and castles. Aimery was present at Béziers when Agnes, widow of the last viscount, Raymond Roger Trencavel, handed the viscounty of Béziers over to Simon de Montfort IV. The next year (1210), Aimery assisted Simon in the siege of Minerve, but he refused, on account of the wishes of his subjects, to participate in the siege of Castelnaudary.

Aimery may have taken part in the Battle of Las Navas de Tolosa in 1212, where the united armies of Spain, led by Alfonso VIII of Castile, Aimery's homeland, routed the Almohads. It is known that Arnaud Amalric, the Archbishop of Narbonne, took part. Pope Innocent III, organiser of the Albigensian Crusade, had granted the title Duke of Narbonne, which had been held by Aimery's uncle and namesake Aimerico Manrique until 1177, to the archbishop. Arnaud was thus Aimery's suzerain by 1212.

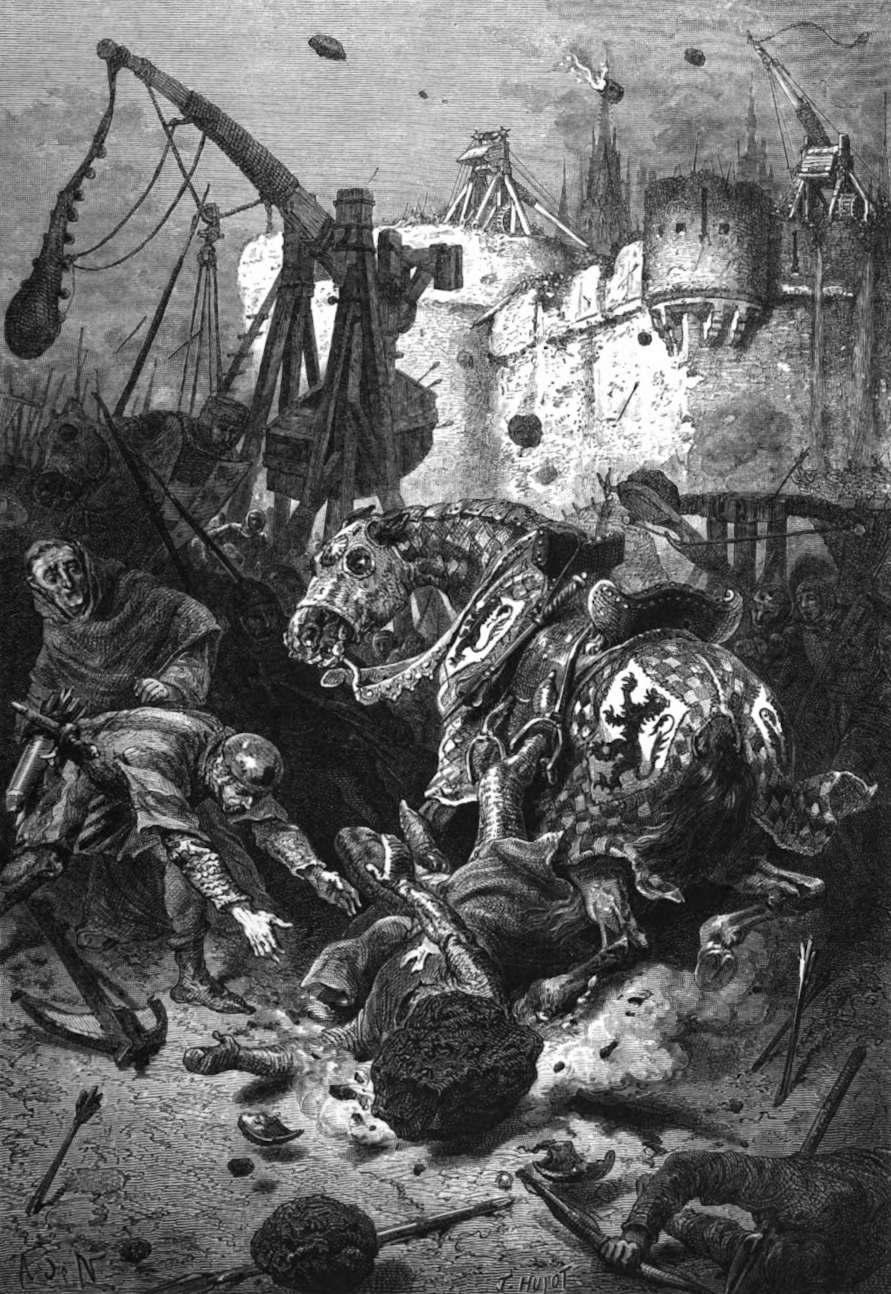
Modern artist's impression of the Siege of Toulouse, at which Aimery was present.

After the Battle of Muret in 1213, Aimery refused entry in Narbonne to Simon de Montfort, who proceeded to besiege the place. Aimery led an effective sally that split the attacking troops and forced them to retreat, lifting the siege. The next year (1214), Aimery was one of those who intervened with Pope Innocent and forced him to order Simon to do homage to King James I of Aragon for his lands in southern France. When Simon hesitated to obey, Aimery prepared for war, but the intervention of Cardinal Peter of Benevento, the Papal legate for Provence, prevented open hostilities. A settlement was reached in April 1214 to which Aimery and the citizens of Narbonne were party.

In 1215 Louis the Lion, the son of the king of France, Philip Augustus, entered the territory of the duchy of Narbonne with an army. Philip had recognised Simon as Duke of Narbonne and now Louis, acting on his father's behalf, ordered the destruction of Narbonne's walls, to prevent any resistance to the royal will from being exercised later. Later that year the Fourth Council of the Lateran opened. Upon his return from the council in 1216, Arnaud Amalric tried to convince Aimery and the citizens of Narbonne to renounce their submission to Simon, but the duke of Narbonne was at the height of his power and the viscount and citizens renewed their submission and were put under Simon's protection.

== Restoration of peace ==
In May 1217, Simon de Montfort was forced to besiege Toulouse after it had fallen into the hands of the deposed Count Raymond VI. Aimery participated in the siege and received the Papal letters defending Simon's actions and excoriating James of Aragon for supporting Raymond. After Simon's death during the siege (1218) and five more years of warfare, Raymond submitted and was appointed Duke of Narbonne in 1223. Aimery did him homage for his viscounty.

Although Aimery's final years were externally peaceful, he had many internal disputes to contend with. He died in February 1239, leaving Narbonne to his eldest son, Amalric I. Aimery's first wife, in 1202, was a Catalan noblewoman, Guillema of Castellvell, separated wife of Guillaume Raymond de Montcada and mother of Guillem II de Montcada, viscount of Bearn. They separated before August 1208.

Aimery's second marriage was to Marguerite de Marly, a Frenchwoman. All of his five children were borne by her.
