= Pedro Fernández de Castro (died 1214) =

Castilian nobleman

Coat of arms of the House of Castro

Pedro Fernández de Castro "the Castilian" (c. 1160 – 18 August, 1214, Morocco) was a Castilian nobleman, son of Fernando Rodríguez de Castro and Estefanía Alfonso la Desdichada (Stephanie "The Unfortunate"). He inherited the Infantazgo of León from his parents and was Mayordomo mayor of Fernando II and his son Alfonso IX of León.

== Family Origins ==
Born around 1160, (Note: In 1174, Fernando and his son Pedro promised to give the Order of Malta, after their respective deaths, all their properties in Ciudad Rodrigo, Ledesma, and their surrounding areas, including the village of Valdespino. At the same time, the prior of the order gave them, to enjoy during their lifetime, the Order's properties in Ciudad Rodrigo and Ledesma and the village of Paradinas de San Juan.) Pedro Fernández de Castro was the son of Fernando Rodríguez de Castro "the Castilian", a member of the House of Castro, son of Rodrigo Fernández de Castro and his wife Elo Álvarez, daughter of Álvar Fáñez and Mayor Pérez. His mother, Stephanie "the Unfortunate", was an illegitimate daughter of King Alfonso VII of León and his mistress Urraca Fernández de Castro. As such, he was the nephew of Ferdinand II of León and Sancho III of Castile, and first cousin of Alfonso VIII of Castile and Alfonso IX of León.

== Paternal inheritance and early years ==
In 1180, his mother, Stephanie Alfonso "The Unfortunate", was murdered by his father, Fernando Rodríguez de Castro, who believed his wife was being unfaithful with another man. After murdering his wife, he realized that he had been wrong and asked King Fernando II, his wife's half-brother, for forgiveness.

After his father died in 1185, Fernández de Castro inherited parental property, including the lordship of Trujillo comprising numerous fortresses and towns in Extremadura and the Infantazgo of León which King Fernando II had given his parents in 1170. He also declared himself a vassal of his cousin King Alfonso VIII of Castile to whom he gave the lordship of Trujillo which the king then gave to the Order of Santiago in 1187, together with half of his income so that the order could populate the territories between the Tajo and the Guadiana. A year later, in 1187, he stipulated in his will that if he died without heirs, all his castles located in Extremadura and León would become the property of the Order of Santiago. (Note: "The donation was made in ipso pacto quod habeo cum domino rege Aldefonso, which implied that those castles could never be used to fight against the king of Castile".) In 1187, he donated Peña Falcón castle to the Order of Alcántara, in favor of his uncle, Fernando Díaz, while the Order of Santiago was given the castles of La Solana and Santa Cruz de los Cáñamos located in the present province of Ciudad Real.

He was entrusted by the king with the government of several fiefs, including Lemos and Sarria in Galicia, plus others in Extremadura and Trasierra, as well as Asturias and the city of León.

Between the years 1185 and 1188, Fernandez de Castro remained a loyal vassal to his cousin Alfonso VIII, but in 1189, he had a falling out with the king and left the kingdom of Castile. He went to serve his cousin Alfonso IX of León, father of Ferdinand III of Castile. Following in the footsteps of his father, he began to ally with the Almohads at different times in detriment of the interests of his cousin, the king of Castile.

His attitude in the remaining years of the twelfth century depended on the evolution of relations between the kingdoms of Castile and León that were under the progressive influence of the papacy and military orders. When King Alfonso IX of León married Teresa of Portugal, daughter of King Sancho I, with the ostensible purpose of an alliance against Castile, several fortresses controlled by Pedro Fernández de Castro were assigned to the Portuguese since he was known to be an enemy of his cousin Alfonso VIII.

In 1191, the kingdoms of Navarre, Portugal, León and Aragon, formed the so-called League of Huesca, whose purpose was to combat the Kingdom of Castile. Meanwhile, Pope Celestine III threatened Alfonso IX of León with excommunication, after marrying his second cousin Berenguela of Castile. Between 1192 and 1193, Fernández de Castro was often in Castile. When he was near Seville, he suffered from a serious illness that doctors could not remedy and he asked to be taken to the Church of San Isidoro en Seville where the Christians of Seville would go often since the remains of Isidore had been buried there before being transferred to the Basilica of Saint Isidore in León. After fulfilling a promise he had made to the saint, he regained his health. Although the year that this took place is not known, it must have been around 1193, before the Battle of Alarcos.

In 1194, Fernandez de Castro tried to sabotage the signing of the Treaty of Tordehumos that was to put an end to the conflict between Alfonso IX of León and Alfonso VIII of Castile. He decided to leave the peninsular Christian kingdoms for Al-Andalus. He entered into an agreement with the Almohads and fought on their side at the Battle of Alarcos, in which Alfonso VIII's troops were defeated by the Muslims.

After the battle, he acted as the mediator in the negotiations between King Alfonso VIII of Castile and King Alfonso IX of León in the city of Toledo. After the failed meeting between the two sovereigns, Fernandez de Castro stayed in León fighting against the kingdom of Castile while his cousin, the king of León, once again named him his Mayordomo mayor.

During the war between Castile and León, and in order to help Castile, Pope Celestine III excommunicated King Alfonso IX, Pedro Fernández de Castro and the other nobles who had helped the Saracens in their fight against Castile. The Pope also released the Leonese King's vassals from their pledge of loyalty to their king.

Nevertheless, the hostilities between both kingdoms ceased in 1197 after the marriage of Alfonso IX of León and Berengaria of Castile since Berengaria's dowry included several castles that her husband had claimed from Castile.

== Marriage and descent ==
He married Jimena Gómez de Manzanedo, daughter of Count Gómez González de Manzanedo and Milia Pérez de Lara, with whom he appears in several charters. They were the parents of:

- Álvaro Pérez de Castro "the Castilian" (died 1240).
- Elo Pérez de Castro (died after 1243). Her first husband, whom she divorced, was Martim Sanches, an illegitimate son of King Sancho I of Portugal and Maria Aires de Fornelos. Divorced from her first husband, in 1205 she married Guerau IV de Cabrera Viscount of Àger, son of Ponce de Cabrera and Marquesa (Miracle) de Urgel. Elo and her husband were the parents of, among others, Ponce I of Urgell. She was buried in the Monastery of Santa María de Valbuena.
- Stephanie Perez de Castro to whom her sister, countess Elo, in 1221 assigned 5,000 maravedíes of income in the Kingdom of Aragón. (Note: Archivo de la Corona de Aragón, published in "Documentos lingüistícos de España" by Ramón Menéndez Pidal.)

== Final years ==
In 1204, Fernandez de Castro again served as Alfonso IX of León's mayordomo mayor and, in the same year, with his wife Jimena and their children Álvaro and Elo and became a familiares of the Order of Calatrava.

A year later, he donated to the Order of Salvatierra and its master, Martín Martínez, the hospital of Santa Olalla, the villa of Ranconada, half of the vineyards that he owned in Aldovea, Cortes, Santa Olaya and the surrounding areas to the south under the condition that the income from these properties were for supporting the hospital in Santa Olalla. In 1204 his cousin Alfonso VIII of Castile restored all the properties that had been previously confiscated by the Leonese Crown.

In 1213, Fernández de Castro donated to the Monastery of Santa María de Sobrado, all his properties in Mayorga and surrounding areas. The charter was confirmed by his brother Martín Fernández a year later.

Pedro Fernandez de Castro died on August 18, 1214, while he was exiled in the kingdom of Morocco. His body was taken to the Iberian Peninsula, and subsequently taken to the kingdom of Castile, where his remains were buried in the Monastery of Santa María de Valbuena. At the same monastery were subsequently buried two of his children, Álvaro and Elo Pérez de Castro.

== Bibliography ==
- Aniz Iriarte, Cándido O.P.; Callejo de Paz, Rufino O.P. (1994). Real monasterio de San Pedro Mártir de Mayorga (in Spanish). Salamanca: San Esteban. ISBN 84-87557-75-9.
- Arco y Garay, Ricardo del (1954). Sepulcros de la Casa Real de Castilla (in Spanish). Madrid: Instituto Jerónimo Zurita. Consejo Superior de Investigaciones Científicas. OCLC 11366237.
- Ayala Martínez, Carlos de; Baresi, Pascal; Josserand, Philippe (2001). Identidad y representación de la frontera en la España medieval (siglos XI-XIV) (in Spanish). Madrid: Universidad Autónoma de Madrid. Casa de Velázquez. ISBN 84-95555-21-2.
- Barquero Goñi, Carlos (1994). "Los hospitalarios y la nobleza castellano-leonesa (siglos XII-XIII)". Historia, instituciones, documentos (in Spanish). No. 21. Seville: Publicaciones de la Universidad de Sevilla. pp. 13–40. ISSN 0210-7716.
- Barton, Simon (2002a). The Aristocracy in Twelfth-Century León and Castile. Cambridge: Cambridge University Press. ISBN 0521-49727-2.
- Barton, Simon (2002b). "Traitors to the Faith? Christian Mercenaries in al-Andalus and the Maghreb, c.1100-1300". In Roger Collins and Anthony Goodman (ed.). Medieval Spain: Culture, Conflict and Coexistence. Basingstoke and New York: Palgrave-Macmillan. pp. 23–45. ISBN 978-0333793879.
- Fernández-Xesta y Vázquez, Ernesto (2001). Relaciones del condado de Urgel con Castilla y León (in Spanish). E&P Libros Antiguos, S.L. ISBN 84-87860-37-0.
- García Fitz, Francisco (2002). Relaciones políticas y guerra. La experiencia castellano-leonesa frente al Islam. Siglos XI-XIII (in Spanish). Seville: Universidad de Sevilla. Servicio de Publicaciones. ISBN 84-472-0708-0.
- García Sanjuán, Alejandro (2004). "Declive y extinción de la minoría cristiana en la Sevilla andalusí (ss. XI-XII)". Historia, instituciones, documentos (in Spanish). No. 31. Seville: Universidad de Sevilla: Departamento de Historia Medieval y Ciencias y Técnicas Historiográficas. pp. 269–286. ISSN 0210-7716.
- Izquierdo Benito, Ricardo; Ruiz Gómez, Francisco (1996). Alarcos, 1195: Actas del Congreso Internacional Conmemorativo del VII Centenario de la Batalla de Alarcos (in Spanish). Ciudad Real: Universidad de Castilla la Mancha. Servicio de Publicaciones. ISBN 84-89492-34-4.
- Madrid y Medina, Ángela (2004). "Un señorío de la orden de Santiago en la Edad Media: el campo de Montiel". Cuaderno de Estudios Manchegos (in Spanish). No. 28. Toledo: Instituto de Estudios Manchegos. pp. 145–176. ISSN 0526-2623.
- Maíllo Salgado, Felipe (2009). "Relaciones de los reinos hispánicos del occidente peninsular y el Magreb en la edad media". El perfume de la amistad: correspondencia diplomática árabe en archivos españoles (siglos XIII-XVII) (PDF) (in Spanish). Madrid: Subdirección General de los Archivos Estatales. pp. 1–16. ISBN 9788481814347. Archived from the original (PDF) on 2014-12-19.
- Mañueco Villalobos, Manuel (1917). Documentos de la Iglesia Colegial de Santa María la Mayor de Valladolid. Siglos XI y XII (in Spanish). Valladolid: Sociedad de Estudios Históricos Castellanos. Imprenta Castellana. OCLC 491652152.
- Martin, Therese; Harries, Julie A. (2005). Church, State, Vellum, and Stone:Essays on Medieval Spain in Honor of John Williams. Brill Academic Publishers. ISBN 9004147055.
- Pascua Echegaray, Esther (2002–2003). "De Reyes, Señores y Tratados en la Península Ibérica del siglo XII". Studia histórica. Historia medieval (in Spanish). No. 20–21. Salamanca: Universidad de Salamanca: Departamento de de Historia Medieval, Moderna y Contemporánea. Ediciones Universidad de Salamanca. pp. 165–187. ISSN 0213-2060.
- Pérez Llamazares, Julio (1954). "Príncipe leonés, héroe de leyenda oriental: el Castellano". Hidalguía: la revista de genealogía, nobleza y armas (in Spanish). No. 6. Madrid: Ediciones Hidalguía.
- Rodríguez-Picavea Matilla, Enrique (1999). "Documentos para el estudio de la Orden de Calatrava en la meseta meridional castellana (1102-1302)" (PDF). Cuadernos de Historia Medieval (in Spanish). Madrid: Universidad Autónoma de Madrid. ISSN 1139-756X. Archived from the original (PDF) on 2010-04-01.
- Riaño Rodríguez, Timoteo; Gutiérrez Aja, Mª del Carmen (1998). Cantar del Mío Cid. 2, Fecha del cantar, autor del Cantar, el códice y fecha del manuscrito (PDF) (in Spanish). Burgos: Diputación de Burgos. ISBN 848684164X.
- Soria, Valentín (1969). "Fortalezas, castillos y torres de Extremadura Medieval". Gladius (in Spanish). Vol. 8. pp. 71–77. doi:10.3989/gladius.1969.177. ISSN 0436-029X.
- Torres Sevilla-Quiñones de León, Margarita Cecilia (1999). Linajes nobiliarios de León y Castilla: Siglos IX-XIII (in Spanish). Salamanca: Junta de Castilla y León, Consejería de educación y cultura. ISBN 84-7846-781-5.
