= Battle of Lobregal =

Coordinates: 41°50′N 5°07′W

The Battle of Lobregal took place in March 1160 between the House of Lara and its allies and the forces of the House of Castro under Fernando Rodríguez de Castro. The result was a victory for the House of Castro.

== Background ==
The battle was the high point of a series of struggles for power between the Lara and Castro families following the death of Sancho III of Castile in August 1158 and the accession of his young son, Alfonso VIII. Initially, a regency under was established under Gutierre Fernández de Castro, Fernando's uncle. In 1159 the Lara had seized the regency and, early in 1160, Fernando had been forced into exile at the court of Ferdinand II of León.

According to Rodrigo Jiménez de Rada, writing in the early thirteenth century, he returned shortly with an army and inflicted a major defeat on his enemies, led by Nuño Pérez de Lara, brother of the young Alfonso's regent, Manrique, at Lobregal in the Tierra de Campos, near Villabrágima. The Anales toledanos primeros, under the year 1160, note an arrancada led by Nuño Pérez in the Tierra de Campos. An arrancada could refer to "as much to a violent incursion, in the style of a chevauchée, as to a military action that ends in serious defeat." Nuño's brothers Manrique and Álvaro may have been present at the battle also.

== Battle ==
In the battle, Fernando's father-in-law, Osorio Martínez, died fighting alongside the Lara. Fernando also captured Nuño Pérez and Rodrigo Gutiérrez. Rodrigo's brother, Álvaro Gutiérrez, died on the field. The captive Lara leaders were released within a few days after swearing an oath to Fernando that they would return after burying Álvaro. Once free Rodrigo promptly placed Álvaro in a sarcophagus, but delayed his burial, believing this exempted him from returning to captivity. Nuño met Fernando at Dueñas with a following of six hundred knights. Under such circumstances Fernando did not dare attempt to take him captive again, and Nuño claimed he had upheld his end of the agreement. The Crónica General de 1344 records that Manrique, who in fact died at Huete four years later, had died on the field of Lobregal and that it was Nuño who received his freedom from captivity for the purpose of burying his brother. This confusion is shared by several other late sources.

== Aftermath ==
Their victory did not allow the Castro to wrest control of Alfonso VIII from the Lara, but it did strengthen their position at the court of Ferdinand II of León, to which they had fled. On 13 March both Fernando and his brother Álvaro confirmed a Leonese charter. They were also able to return to Castile by 11 July, when the confirmed a charter of Alfonso VIII alongside the three Lara brothers and their uncle, Gutierre Fernández, indicating a peace accord by that date. The Castro brothers had returned to the Leonese court by at least September, but they did not confirm Ferdinand II's only charter issued in November that year. It appears that a general peace followed the Battle of Lobregal. There is no record of further armed conflict in 1160, but in 1162 Ferdinand II took Toledo from the Castilians and in 1164 the Castro defeated the Lara again at the Battle of Huete.
