= Ferdinand II of Spain =

Ferdinand II of Spain may refer to:

- Ferdinand II of Leon, (21 August 1157 – 22 January 1188)
- Ferdinand II of Aragon, (20 January 1479 – 23 January 1516), also King of Castile and Léon as Ferdinand V (15 January 1475 – 26 November 1504)
