= Álvaro Pérez de Lara =

Álvaro Pérez de Lara (died 15 September 1172) was a nobleman of the Lara family. He was the youngest son of Pedro González de Lara. His mother was Eva, who may have been a daughter of Pedro Froilaz de Traba, or perhaps a Frenchwoman. She was originally married to García Ordóñez, but was married to Pedro by November 1127 at the latest. Álvaro is mentioned in documents between 8 February 1141 and 10 May 1172. He held the tenencia of Aguilar de Campóo for a long time early in his career (1146–65). He also patronised the Praemonstratensian monastery there. On 15 February 1149 he called himself filius comitis ("the count's son") in a document, perhaps to indicate his aspiration for a comital title. He is first recorded as a count (Latin comes), the highest title granted in the kingdom, on 19 November 1166.

Early in 1160 he and his brothers Manrique and Nuño were defeated at the Battle of Lobregal by the rival Castro family in one of the most violent aristocratic feuds of twelfth-century Spain. He was also present with his brothers at the Battle of Huete in the summer of 1164, where the Laras were defeated by the Castros a second time and Manrique was killed. During the latter part of his career, Álvaro ruled Asturias de Santillana (1156–70) and briefly held the tenencia of Burgos (1168), the top military post in the capital of Castile. He also briefly held the tenencias of Grajal (1162) and Viesgo (1155).
