= Siege of Cáceres =

Siege of Cáceres may refer to:

- Siege of Cáceres (1184) – Almohad city unsuccessfully besieged by León
- Siege of Cáceres (1218) – Almohad city unsuccessfully besieged by León
