= Brazacorta =

Coordinates: 41°43′N 3°22′W

- Municipality and town
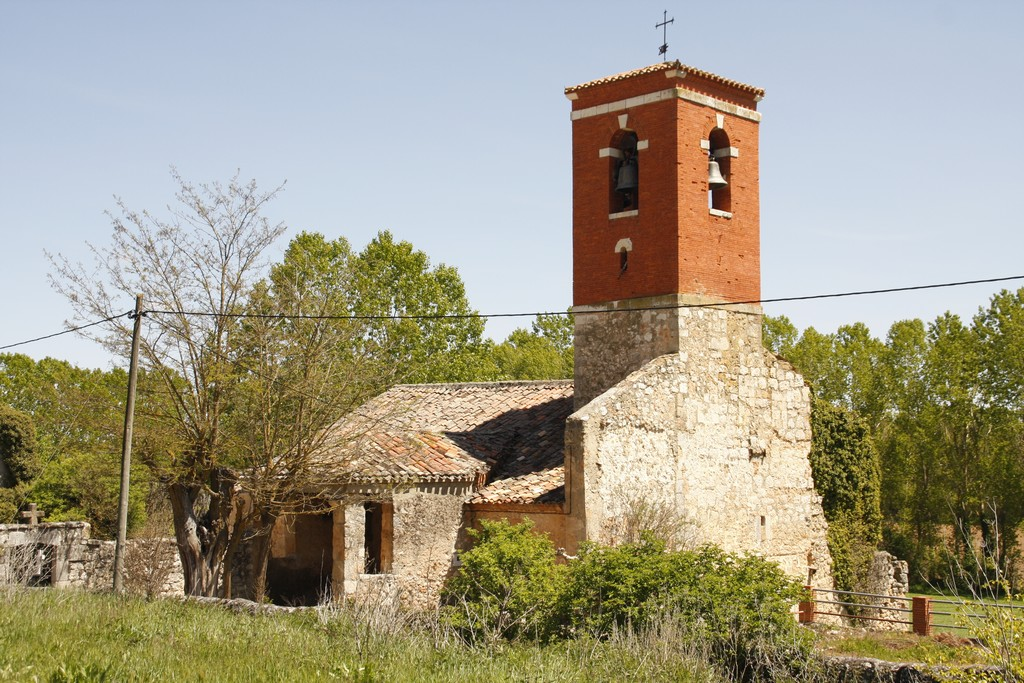
- Nuestra Señora de la Asunción church (13th-14th century)

- Flag Coat of arms
- Interactive map of Brazacorta
- Country: Spain
- Autonomous community: Castile and León
- Province: Burgos
- Comarca: Ribera del Duero

Area
  - Total: 21.08 km^{2} (8.14 sq mi)
- Elevation: 899 m (2,949 ft)

Population (2025-01-01)
  - Total: 43
  - Density: 2.0/km^{2} (5.3/sq mi)
- Time zone: UTC+1 (CET)
  - Summer (DST): UTC+2 (CEST)
- Postal code: 09490
- Website: http://www.brazacorta.es/

Brazacorta is a municipality and town located in the province of Burgos, Castile and León, Region of Ribera, Spain. According to the 2007 census (INE), the municipality had a population of 75 inhabitants.

== History ==
There was a nuns monastery, founded by the Countess Ermesanda, the widow of Manrique Pérez de Lara. It is a villa recognized as a "pueblo solo" of the region of Aranda de Duero. Jurisdiction of the lordship made by the Coruña Count, who elected the mayor.

When the Antiguo Régimen ended, it was considered as a constitutional town with the same name, Aranda which belonged to the region of The Old Castile. had 112 inhabitants at that moment.

== Monuments ==
- Hermitage Cristo Humilladero
- Assumption church (S.XIII)
- Old laundries.

== Events ==
- 20 January (Saint Sebastian)
- 24 June (Saint John the Baptist)
- 15 August (Nuestra Señora de la Asunción) This one is the most popular party.
