= Manrique Pérez de Lara =

Spanish noble, first Lord of Molina (died 1164)

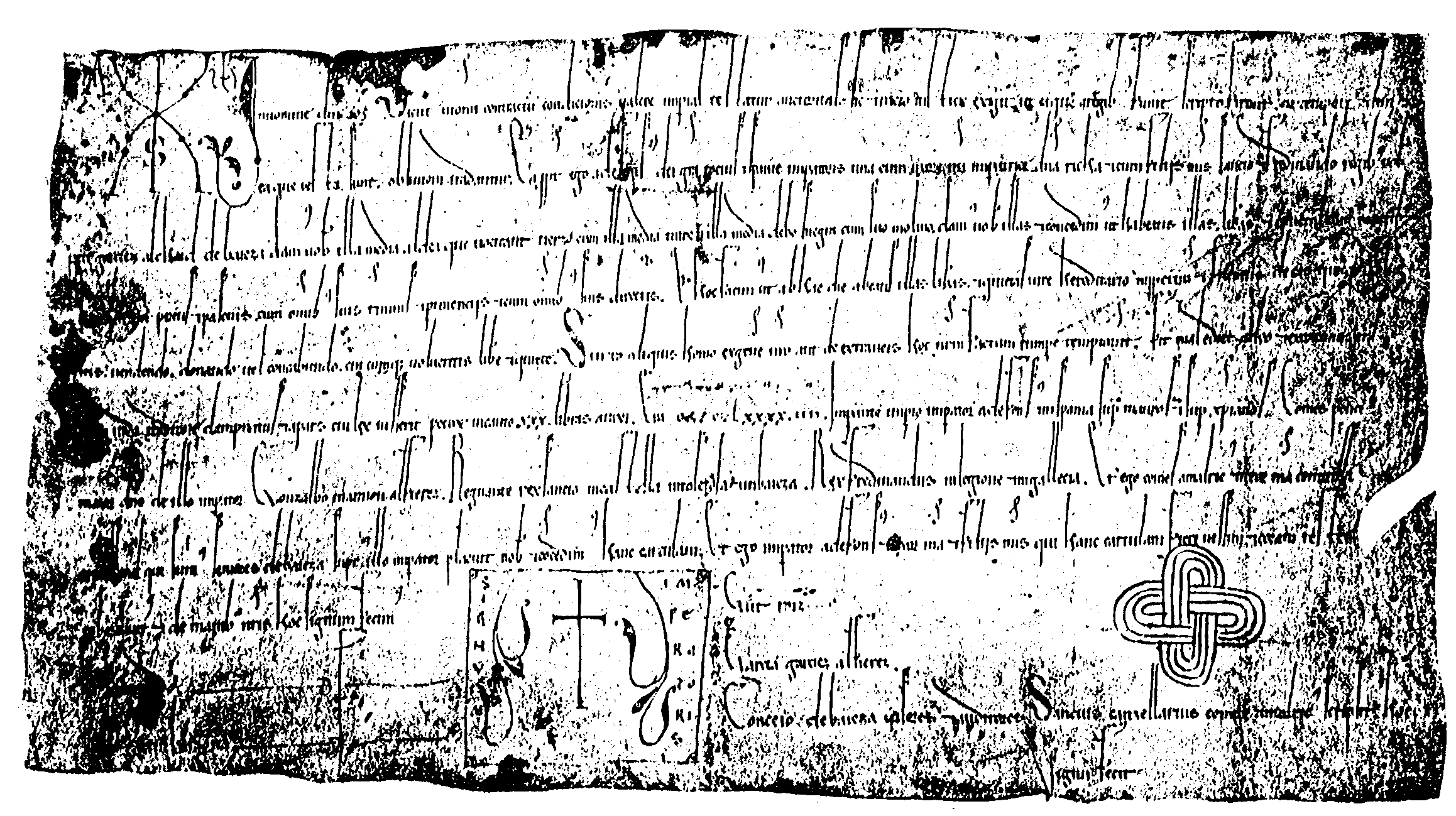
Royal charter issued by Manrique under exceptional circumstances in 1156. Note the imperial signum in the bottom centre.

Manrique Pérez de Lara (died 1164) was a magnate of the Kingdom of Castile and its regent from 1158 until his death. He was a leading figure of the House of Lara and one of the most important counsellors and generals of three successive Castilian monarchs: Alfonso VII (1126–57), Sancho III (1157–58) and Alfonso VIII (1158–1214).

== Parentage ==
Manrique's father was Pedro González de Lara (died 1130). Of Pedro's rule and Manrique's succession to his position of honour and leadership in the Reconquista, a contemporary writes:

He took after his father in everything that he did. His father was Count Pedro of Lara, who ruled his own land for many years. The son also follows in all his father's footsteps. Still in the flower of youth, but enriched with honour and respected by the Emperor as is his nature, he was the upholder of the law, the worst scourge of the Moors.

Manrique's mother Eva is of unknown parentage, but had previously been married to count García Ordóñez. Older historians speculated that she was daughter of Pedro Fróilaz de Traba and his wife Mayor de Urgell, in part to explain his political interests associated with the county of Urgell, but this is untenable. Her own non-Iberian name and that of her son Manrique seem to point to an origin north of the Pyrenees. Several theories have been put forward, including making her a daughter of Aimeric V, viscount of Rochechouart, one of the French barons who had joined the Siege of Tudela in 1087, or of Hugh II, Count of Empúries, and his wife Sancha de Urgell. The first mention of Manrique's parents' marriage dates from November 1127, and must have occurred after 1108, when García Ordóñez was killed. Manrique had three full brothers: Álvaro, Nuño and Rodrigo. He also had three half-siblings, Elvira and Fernando, children of his father's liaison with Queen Urraca, and count García Garcés de Aza, son of his mother's first marriage. Count Pedro had two documented daughters, Milia, wife of Gómez González de Manzanedo, and María. Their maternity is not explicitly documented, but at least Milia was probably a full sister of Manrique.

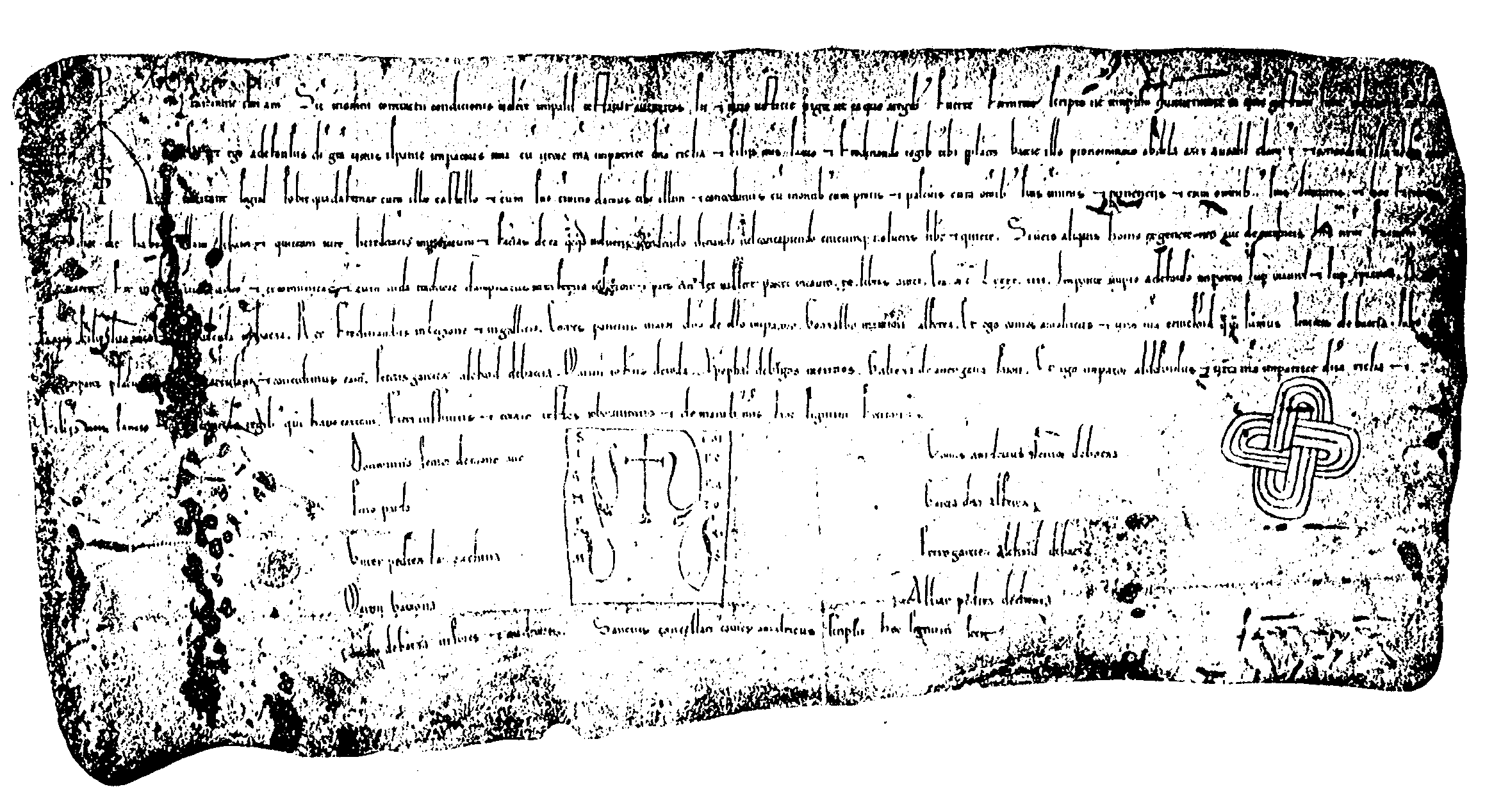
Another royal charter issued by Manrique under exceptional circumstances in 1156. Note the imperial signum in the bottom centre.

== Count and tenente (1145–1158) ==
Between 26 December 1134 and 2 June 1137 Manrique served as alférez, that is, head of the military household, of Alfonso VII. This post was usually reserved for young noblemen with promising career prospects. In 1143 Manrique was granted the tenencia (or honor, a fief governed on behalf of the crown) of Atienza, and in 1144 he received those of Ávila, Madrid and Toledo. Madrid he only governed until the next year (1145) and Ávila until 1150. On 21 August 1145 Manrique was made a count, the highest rank in the kingdom, by Alfonso VII in the ancient capital city of León. A charter survives that reads: "Manrique the same day this charter was made was made a count". Although it was common for aristocratic sons to accede to the titles of their fathers on the latters' deaths, Manrique had to wait fifteen years to receive the comital title from the king. While he continued to rule Atienza and Toledo, he also received the tenencias of Medinaceli in 1146. That year Alfonso sent him, Ponce Giraldo de Cabrera, Ermengol VI of Urgell, and Martín Fernández de Hita to help the king's Muslim ally Sayf al-Dawla regain the cities of Baeza, Jaén and Úbeda. This they succeeded in doing, but they soon quarrelled with Sayf al-Dawla, was defeated in the battle of Albacete and killed. In January 1147 Manrique played a key rôle in the capture of Calatrava, a fact the king acknowledged in a charter drawn up on 9 January. In August Manrique took part in the reconquest of Almería and its hinterland, which included the taking of Baeza, which he immediately received from the king as a tenencia. He is highly praised by the anonymous author of the Poema de Almería, who cites his splendour and generosity ahead of his wisdom and valour:

Count Manrique, a sincere friend of Christ, valiant in warfare, is placed in charge of all these towns [Andújar, Baños, Bayona and Baeza]. He was liked by all, just as he was liked by the Emperor, so that he shone among the Saracens and Christians alike. Illustrious in reputation and beloved by all, bountiful and generous, he was niggardly to no man. He was skilled in arms, he possessed the mind of a sage, he delighted in battle and was a master of the science of war.

This emphasis was typical in the period, when generosity, munificence and prodigality were considered signs of greatness, and the rewarding of followers was essential to maintaining one's power. In Baeza, Manrique's rule can be traced for a decade, until 1157. In 1148 he received the tenencia of Segovia. In November 1148 Manrique and others of his family donated some houses in Toledo, which he ruled at the time, to Gonzalo de Marañón. It is a sign of the diversity of his interests that he owned urban properties in the most important city in the kingdom.

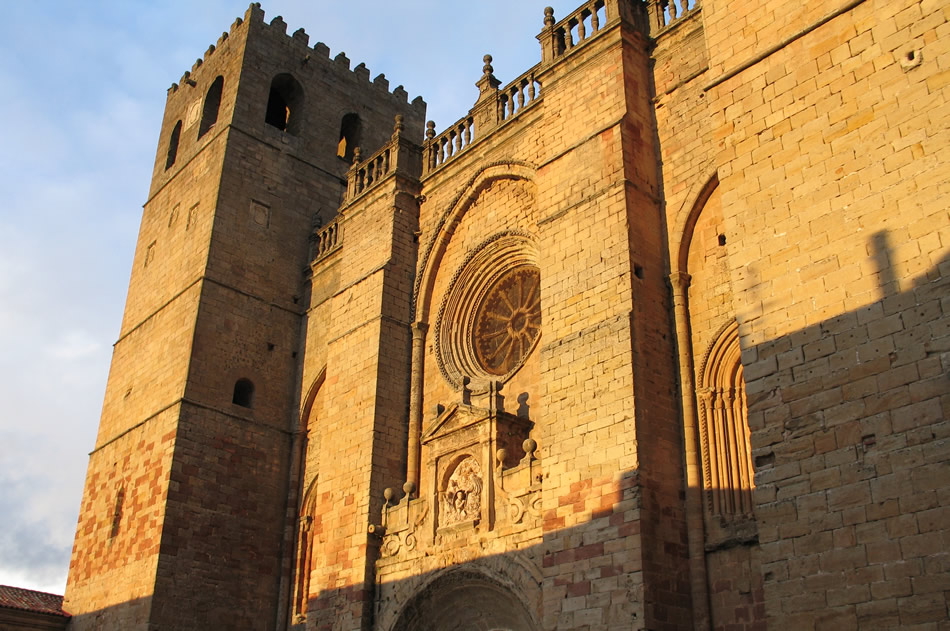
The fortress-like Romanesque cathedral of Sigüenza enjoyed the patronage of Manrique Pérez

In 1149 Manrique was entrusted with the tutorship of the king's eldest son and heir, the future Sancho III, who was raised in his household. Some indication of the size of Manrique's household—court is perhaps the better word—is given by the fact that he employed at least two individuals, Gonzalo Peláez and García Díaz, in the post of alférez in 1153 and 1156 respectively. Manrique is also known to have employed a chaplain (capellanus). In 1153 this office was filled by a certain Sebastian, who was also acting as Manrique's scribe when needed. By November 1155 he had hired a clerk named Sancho who signed his documents as "chancellor".

In February 1152 Manrique encouraged the settlement of Balaguera and Cedillo in the Extremadura by dividing his property there amongst some settlers. Sometime before December 1153, Manrique married Ermessinde, daughter of Aimeric II of Narbonne and a cousin of Raymond Berengar IV of Barcelona. They had children: Aimerico, Ermengarda, Guillermo (William), María, Pedro and Sancha. On 5 December 1153, in their first recorded action as husband and wife, Manrique and Ermessinde gave the village of Cobeta to the Benedictine monasteries of Arlanza, San Salvador de Oña and Santo Domingo de Silos, and the cathedral of Santa María in Sigüenza, at the time under construction according to a Benedictine plan. The charter of this donation was drawn up by Sebastian. It survives with tags which once attached a seal, now lost. Manrique may have been the first member of the Castilian nobility to employ a seal to authenticate documents. The royal chancery had only been employing them from 1146, though episcopal chanceries had already adopted them under French influence (1140). Manrique's marital connexion with the rulers of Narbonne may have influenced his decision, and his seal was probably based on the type used in Languedoc at the time. In 1163, when the chancery of the young Alfonso VIII adopted a seal, it was probably based on Manrique's. The earliest surviving aristocratic seal from Castile is one of Manrique's son Pedro, from document of 1179 drawn up at Calatayud. A look at the earliest seals of Alfonso VIII and Pedro Manrique suggests that Manrique's own seal showed an armed, stylised, equestrian figure patterned after Anglo-French designs, but left-facing in the Mediterranean fashion.

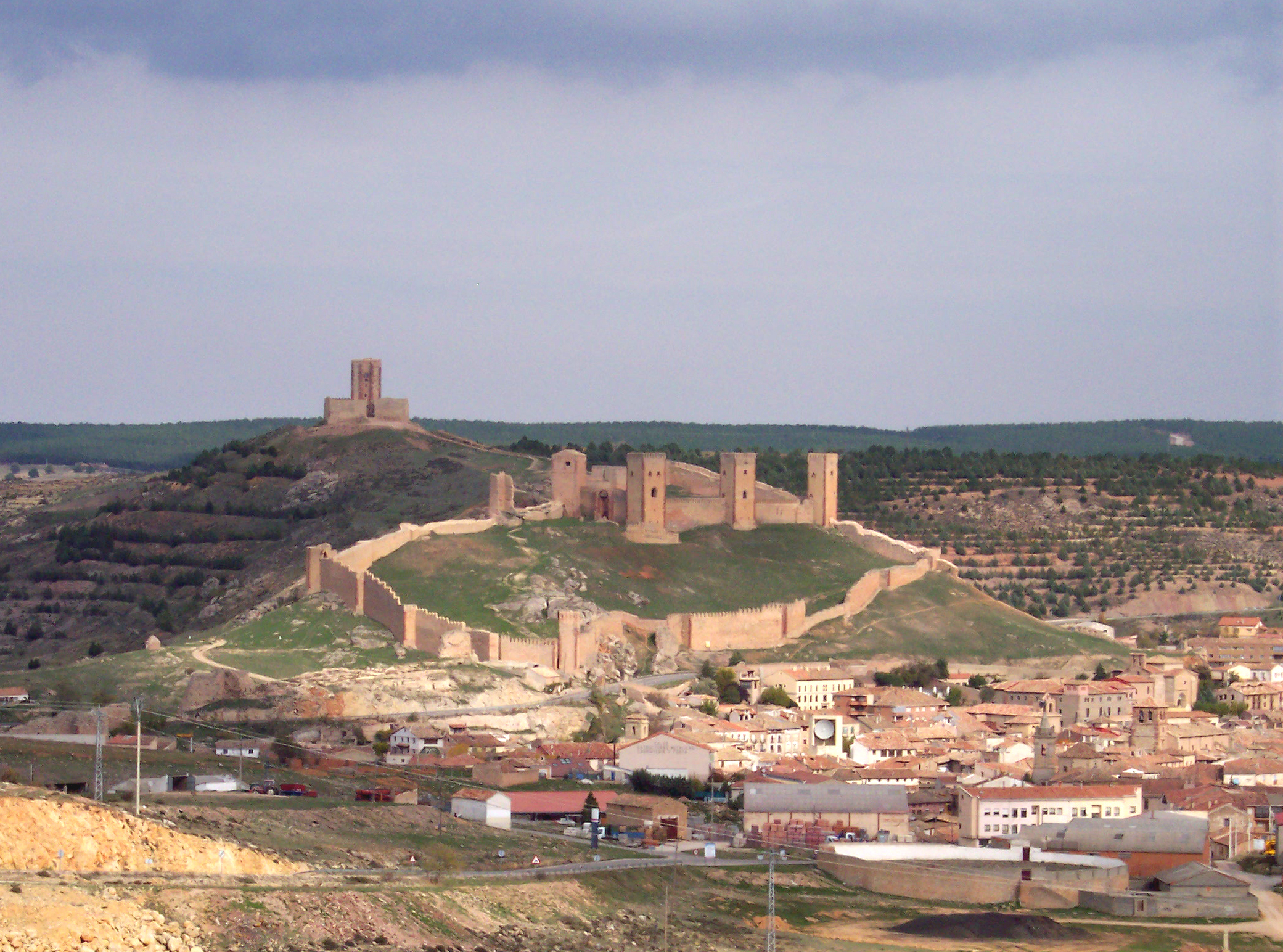
The extensive fortifications of Molina, Manrique's semi-independent fief, to which he granted a fuero in 1154.

On 21 April 1154 Manrique and Ermessinde issued a sweeping fuero to the town of Molina de Aragón. The document survives only in a thirteenth-century copy, and it may have been amended in light of later twelfth-century fueros, although much of its material has precedents in the early twelfth century. It lists the privileges of the inhabitants, the rents owed to Manrique, a list of officials who would serve on the municipal council and an extensive legal code. A large portion of the law deals with the formation of the local militia. Knights (caballeros) who lived in the town with their families for a certain period of the year were exempted from taxes. A fifth of the booty taken by the local militia in war was to go to Manrique, and those who skipped out on their military obligations were fined. Unprecedentedly (and perhaps suspiciously), a maintenance was paid to those who captured Muslim leaders in battle and had to temporarily support them before they were handed over to the king. The fuero also mandated watchtower duty, a medical allowance for wounds received in war, the use of battle standards, and standards of military equipment for both cavalry and infantry. Also without precedent is a law requiring all those with a certain amount of wealth to purchase a horse and serve in the militia as a knight. If the thirteenth-century copy is accurate to the original, the fuero of Molina marks a transition in the customary law martial law of the peninsula, especially of Castile and Aragon. The semi-independent nature of the rule of Manrique and his successors at Molina has been likened to the rule of Rodrigo Díaz de Vivar at Valencia two generations earlier and to the contemporary rule of Pedro Ruiz de Azagra in Albarracín. Manrique even used the formula Dei gratia comes ("count by the grace of God"), implying that his power did not derive from the king. When the lordship passed to the crown through the marriage of María de Molina and Sancho IV, Molina was retained as a subsidiary title until the time of Isabel II.

In November 1155 Manrique bought the vill of Alcolea from García Garcés de Aza for 1,000 maravedís, a sign of his wealth. It is a sign of his power influence that in 1156 he, as governor (tenente) of Baeza and its entire district, was, under exceptional circumstances, conceded by the king the right to make three grants of reconquered (and thus royal) land to his supporters in the region, as part of the programme of repopulation. The charters, which did not require the confirmation of any members of the royal court, were drawn up by Manrique's scribe and authenticated with Manrique's seal. It is probable that the exceptional circumstances which led Alfonso to leave the function of the royal chancery in the hands of Manrique and his household staff was the pressing need to secure the region against the threatening Almohads.

That same year (1156), Manrique was entrusted with the tenencia of Burgo de Osma, which he subinfeudated to his vassal Diego Pérez as alcalde. Manrique was also governing the Mediterranean port city of Almería (near Alcolea) in January 1157. Later that year both Almería and Baeza were lost to the Almohads. In August that year, Alfonso VII died. According to the De rebus Hispaniae, written by a Navarrese cleric, Rodrigo Jiménez de Rada, a century later, the division of Alfonso VII's empire between his heirs was a result of the evil counsel of Manrique Pérez de Lara and Fernando Pérez de Traba, who together "aimed to sow the seed of discord". Alfonso's elder son, Sancho, succeeded in Castile and Toledo, while his second son, Ferdinand II, succeeded in León and Galicia. Sancho died on 31 August 1158 and Manrique became regent and guardian of the child king Alfonso VIII. At least one later account with a pro-Leonese bias, the Chronicon mundi of Lucas de Tuy, asserts that Ferdinand II became regent and protector of Alfonso VIII, but this is a fabrication.

== Regency of Castile (1158–1164) ==
In the dispute over Alfonso VIII's regency that followed Sancho's death, the Lara family forced the Castro family into exile, igniting a civil war. Rodrigo Jiménez, perhaps relying on a popular legend, states that Manrique had the body of Gutierre Fernández de Castro disinterred and held as a ransom. In January 1160 he took over the government of the Extremadura on behalf of the crown, all the while continuing to hold Atienza and Toledo. In March 1160 the exiled Castro leader, Fernando Rodríguez, returned to confront the Laras and their allies in the Battle of Lobregal. The Castros were victorious, and Manrique's brother Nuño was captured, but the Laras were not displaced. By March 1161 the guardianship of the young Alfonso, initially held by Gutierre Fernández, followed by García Garcés de Aza, was being exercised by Manrique, who was styled nutritius regis ("nurturer of the king") and manente super negotia regni ("manager over the affairs of the kingdom"). In 1162 Manrique lost the tenencias of Atienza and Toledo and was placed in San Esteban de Gormaz.

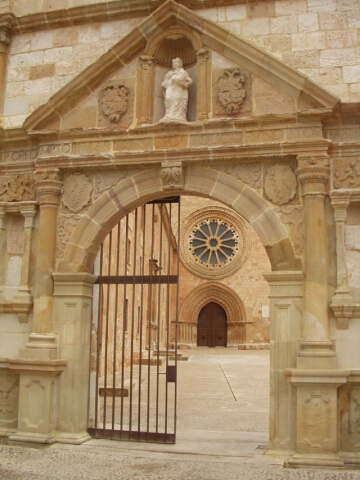
Abbey of Huerta, where Manrique was buried.

Manrique was killed by Fernando Rodríguez at the Battle of Huete, a repeat of the disaster of Lobregal, in 1164, but the day of this battle is uncertain. The Anales toledanos primeros date it to 9 July and note Manrique's death: "They killed Count Manrique on the ninth day of the month of July in the Era 1202 [AD 1164]." There is a charter dated 21 June 1164, an earlier source than the Anales, that places the battle on 3 June:

. . .in the year this charter was written when Fernando Rodríguez with those of Toledo and of Huete fought with the count Don Manrique and this same count Don Manrique was killed, and many other Castilians [with him]. . . This charter was made on the fifth day of the week, the eleventh kalends of July [Thursday, 21 June]. Under the Era 1202 [AD 1164]. Fifteen and three days before this charter was made [3 June] Count Don Manrique and his knights were killed.

Manrique was buried in the Cistercian abbey of Santa María de Huerta, founded by Alfonso VII in 1147 and destined to be heavily patronised by the Lara family. His widow, Ermessinde, was still alive as late as 1175, when she donated property in Molina de Aragón to her grandson García Pérez and to the Order of Calatrava. She also made many donations to Santa María de Huerta and to the Praemonstratensian monastery of Santa María de La Vid. Besides Calatrava, she patronised the Knights Hospitaller. She founded a Praemonstratensian convent at Brazacorta.

Preceded by Ramiro Fróilaz	Alférez del rey 1134–1137	Succeeded by Diego Fróilaz

== Bibliography ==
- Simon Barton. The Aristocracy in Twelfth-century León and Castile. Cambridge: Cambridge University Press, 1997.
- Simon Barton and Richard A. Fletcher, edd. The World of El Cid: Chronicles of the Spanish Reconquest. Manchester: Manchester University Press, 2000.
- José María Canal Sánchez-Pagín, "El conde García Ordóñez, rival del Cid Campeador: su familia, sus servicios a Alfonso VI." Anuario de Estudios Medievales, 27:749–73 (1997).
- Simon R. Doubleday. The Lara Family: Crown and Nobility in Medieval Spain. Cambridge, Massachusetts: Harvard University Press, 2001.
- Joseph J. Duggan. The Cantar de Mio Cid: Poetic Creation in Its Economic and Social Contexts. Cambridge: Cambridge University Press, 1989.
- Nancy Joe Dyer. "Alfonsine Historiography: The Literary Narrative". Emperor of Culture: Alfonso X the Learned of Castile and His Thirteenth-Century Renaissance. Robert I. Burns, ed. Philadelphia: University of Pennsylvania Press, 1990, 141–158.
- Richard A. Fletcher. The Episcopate in the Kingdom of León in the Twelfth Century. Oxford: Oxford University Press, 1978.
- Enrique Flórez. España Sagrada, XXIII. Madrid: 1767.
- Glenn Edward Lipskey. The Chronicle of Alfonso the Emperor: A Translation of the Chronica Adefonsi imperatoris. PhD dissertation, Northwestern University. 1972.
- Faustino Menéndez Pidal de Navascués. "Los sellos de los señores de Molina". Anuario de estudios medievales, 14(1984), 101–119.
- James F. Powers. A Society Organized for War: The Iberian Municipal Militias in the Central Middle Ages, 1000–1284. Berkeley: University of California Press, 1987.
- Luis Sánchez Belda. "Notas de diplomática: En torno a tres diplomas de Alfonso VII". Hispania, 11(1951):42, 47–61.
- Antonio Sánchez de Mora, La nobleza castellana en la plena Edad Media: el linaje de Lara (SS. XI–XIII), Doctoral Thesis (University of Seville, 2003).
