= Battle of Huete =

Coordinates: 40°8′51″N 2°41′20″W

The Battle of Huete took place in 1164 between the Lara family and its allies, and the Castro family and its supporters. It was part of the civil war which engulfed the Kingdom of Castile following the death of Sancho III (1158), wherein competing factions sought control of his minor son and successor, Alfonso VIII. In 1162 the same two factions had met at the Battle of Lobregal. At Huete the Lara leaders were the three brothers Manrique, Nuño, and Álvaro Pérez de Lara. The Castro were led by Fernando Rodríguez de Castro, who had been in exile at the court of Ferdinand II of León since 1160.

Fernando was with the court of León at least as late as 16 April, but by early summer he was in the castle of Huete in Toledo amassing forces for an invasion of Castile. According to the mid-thirteenth-century Crónica de la población de Ávila the town of Ávila joined with the king and "his other vassals", obviously the Lara and their allies, and "went to besiege Toledo", where Fernando was. It explains how the Castilians "chased Fernando from place to place" and forced him to abandon the kingdom, that is, the kingdom of Toledo, which Ferdinand of León had conquered in 1162. It is probable that Fernando fled to Huete at this time. Manrique, bringing the child Alfonso VIII along with him, led a force against Fernando at Huete. In the words of the Chronica latina regum castellae, "at that time Count Manrique fought against Fernando Rodríguez, who had with him the people of Huete. The Count had with him the child [king]". Fernando's troops were drawn from Toledo and the Transierra, especially the towns of Huete, Toledo, and Zorita. According to the late Crónica de Veinte Reyes Manrique demanded that Fernando turn over the castle of Huete, but the latter refused, citing Sancho III's command that tenants should continue to hold their royal fiefs until Alfonso VIII came of age. Manrique then ordered his brother Nuño to guard the young king and take him to Zorita if he was in any danger.

Battle was joined in front of Huete and, as at Lobregal, the Castro were the victors. This time Manrique was killed in the field by Fernando. Nevertheless, the young Alfonso remained in the control of the Lara and Fernando was forced to return to León. After Manrique's death, his brothers led the retreat to Zorita with the king and from there to Ávila, where the prelates with them negotiated their reception and afterwards a cessation to hostilities. The date of this battle is uncertain. The Anales toledanos primeros date it to 9 July and note Manrique's death: "They killed Count Manrique on the ninth day of the month of July in the Era 1202 [AD 1164]." There is a charter in the Becerro mayor de Aguilar de Campoo (the main cartulary of the monastery of Santa María la Real de Aguilar) dated 21 June 1164, an earlier source than the Anales, that places the battle on 3 June:

. . .in the year this charter was written when Fernando Rodríguez with those of Toledo and of Huete fought with the count Don Manrique and this same count Don Manrique was killed, and many other Castilians [with him]. . . This charter was made on the fifth day of the week, the eleventh kalends of July [Thursday, 21 June]. Under the Era 1202 [AD 1164]. Fifteen and three days before this charter was made [3 June] Count Don Manrique and his knights were killed.

The cartulary copy of this charter is much later than 1164 and it is not improbable that its dating clause is in error.

== Bibliography ==
- Simon Barton. The Aristocracy in Twelfth-century León and Castile. Cambridge: Cambridge University Press, 1997.
- Enrique Flórez. España Sagrada, XXIII. Madrid: 1767.
- Antonio Sánchez de Mora. La nobleza castellana en la plena Edad Media: el linaje de Lara (SS. XI–XIII). Doctoral Thesis, University of Seville, 2003. Available as a .pdf here.
