= Siege of Cáceres (1184) =

King Ferdinand II of León unsuccessfully besieged the walled city of Cáceres in the Almohad Empire from January to May 1184.

The siege of Cáceres was a product of the Treaty of Fresno-Lavandera between Ferdinand and Alfonso VIII of Castile of June 1183. This treaty obligated each king to make war on the Almohads. It became public at Christmastime, perhaps because Ferdinand's truce with the Almohads dating to 1178 was set to expire then. Otherwise, Ferdinand must have broken the truce. His choice to target Cáceres on the eastern end of his short frontier with the Almohads may have been designed to prevent any Castilian encroachments from further limiting Leonese expansion.

Ferdinand was aided in the siege by the Order of Santiago, the Knights Templar and the Knights Hospitaller. The grand master of Santiago was present. By 26 May, a large Almohad army had mustered at Seville. When Ferdinand learned of it, he chose to lift the lengthy siege rather than risk his fatigued force in battle. In the event, the Almohad army laid siege to Santarem in Portugal.
