= Grajal de Campos =

Grajal de Campos Grayal de Campos
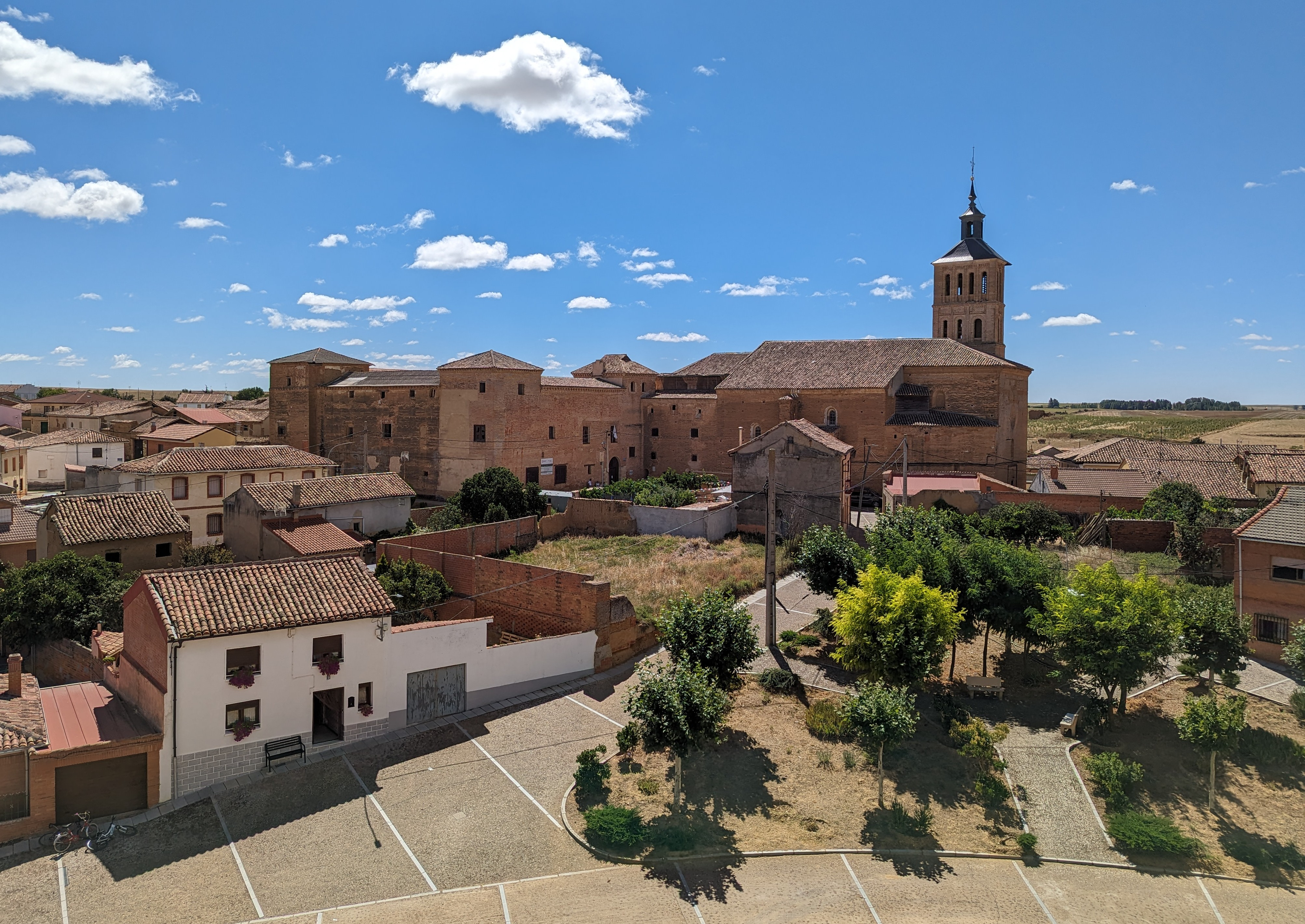

- Coat of arms

- Location within Spain
- Coordinates: 42°19′15″N 5°1′14″W
- Country: Spain
- Autonomous community: Castile and León
- Province: León
- Municipality: Grajal de Campos

Government
  - Mayor: Támara Alonso Martínez (PP)

Area
  - Total: 25.37 km^{2} (9.80 sq mi)
- Elevation: 794 m (2,605 ft)

Population (2025-01-01)
  - Total: 200
  - Density: 7.9/km^{2} (20/sq mi)
- Demonym: graliarense
- Time zone: UTC+1 (CET)
  - Summer (DST): UTC+2 (CEST)
- Postal Code: 24340
- Telephone prefix: 987
- Climate: Cfb

Grajal de Campos (Spanish pronunciation: [ɡɾaˈxal de ˈkampos]), Grayal de Campos in Leonese language, is a municipality located in the province of León, Castile and León, Spain. According to the 2010 census (INE), the municipality has a population of 246 inhabitants. There is a historical castle in the town.

== See also ==
- Tierra de Campos
