= Aimerico Manrique de Lara =

Aimerico Manrique de Lara or Aimeric (Note: His name can be spelled Aymeric, and is sometimes Gallicised as Aimery, but he is not usually numbered among the others of this name who ruled Narbonne.) (c. 1152 – 14 October 1177) was the co-ruler of the Viscounty of Narbonne from 1167 and self-styled Duke of Narbonne from 1172. He was the nephew and heir of the Viscountess Ermengarda. He appears briefly to have ruled Narbonne in his own name from 1176 until his death.

== Origins ==
Aimeric is first mentioned in a royal charter for Segovia Cathedral (March 1161) and later in the concession of the village of Madrigal to Burgos Cathedral (August 1164). He was either the eldest or second eldest son of Manrique Pérez, head of the Lara family and count of Molina, and Ermessende, daughter of Aimeric II of Narbonne and sister of Ermengarda. The seventeenth-century historian of the Lara family, Luis de Salazar y Castro, reasoned that Aimeric was the eldest son because he inherited Narbonne and was listed before his brother Pedro Manrique in the document of 1164. He was listed second, however, in that of 1161, and as Pedro inherited Molina, which was regarded as more important by the Laras, it is more likely that Aimeric was a second son, according to Antonio Sánchez de Mora. Derek Nicholson also held that Aimeric was the eldest son, since Pedro later followed their aunt in Narbonne, which has the appearance of following a line of succession. Karl Appel, following Joseph Vaissète, thought Aimeric was the eldest son and placed his birth towards 1152, when his parents were married, because of the number of children they had after him.

== First trip to Narbonne (1167–71) ==
Perhaps because she had no descendants or being a woman required a man beside her to consolidate her authority, Ermengarda invited her nephew Aimeric to share power with her in Narbonne, and designated him her heir. He is first recorded north of Pyrnees with his aunt in 1167, when the two witnessed their overlord, Count Raymond V of Toulouse, confer certain fiefs on Count Roger Bernard I of Foix, thus forming an alliance against the increasing power of King Alfonso II of Aragon. In 1169 Ermengarda and Aimeric gained a new vassal of their own by granting Peyrac in fief to Raymond de Triavilla.

In 1171 Ermengarda witnessed the sealing of an alliance between the count of Toulouse and Roger II Trencavel, who held several viscounties neighbouring Narbonne and was a former ally of the king of Aragon. Aimeric was absent from the region at this time, and he can be seen with his family at Molina in 1172. A rupture between the count of Toulouse and the viscount of Narbonne can be seen to date from this period, when Raymond emphasises his suzerainty over Narbonne by titling himself Duke of Narbonne in his act of alliance with the Trencavel, and Aimeric began using the same title, implying a rejection of Toulousain suzerainty, while he was in Spain. The break of Ermengarda and Aimeric with Raymond may have had to do with the latter's submission and oath of vassalage to Henry II of England and his son Richard, Duke of Aquitaine, on 25 February 1173, for Ermengarda wrote at that time to Louis VII of France seeking his protection against the count of Toulouse.

== Final stay in Narbonne (1174–77) ==
By 1174 Aimeric had returned north of the Pyrenees, and was present to receive the homage of several of the vassals of Narbonne and to renew the alliance of 1164 with the Republic of Pisa, represented by its ambassador Ildebrandino Sismondi. He was also in on the confirmation of the village of Terrail to the Archbishop of Narbonne in 1176, which Ermengarda had apparently ceded some years before. In 1176 Ermengarda intervened in a pact between the count of Toulouse and the king of Aragon, but it was soon broken. Roger Trencavel led several of his neighbours into an alliance with Aragon in 1177, and agreed to defend the rights of the viscounts of Narbonne, recognising the rights of Aimeric at the same time. In early 1176, Ermengarda to retired to the monastery of Fontfroide, leaving the reins of government in Narbonne in Aimeric's hands.

Aimeric died on 14 October 1177. Raymond V recovered his rights in Narbonne and his ducal title. Peire Rogier, a troubadour who frequented Ermengarda's court, addressed a poem to the viscountess and Aimeric. It is one of Peire's few datable works, coming between the years of Aimeric's arrival and death, although Appel was prepared to place it in 1177 precisely:

Bastart, tu vay [Bastard, go]
e porta.m lay [and carry there]
mon sonet a mon Tort-n'avetz; [my song to my You-Are-Wrong]
e di.m a n'Aimeric lo tos [and give it to your Lord Aimeric]
membre.lh dont es e sia pros. [that he remember what he is and be brave]

This, the seventh and final stanza, is called a tornada and it is addressed to one, usually a joglar, this time called Bastart ("bastard"), who will go perform the song to the intended recipients, in this case Ermengarda and Aimeric. The phrase Tort-n'avetz ("you are wrong") is a senhal ("signal"), a disguised reference, usually to the poet's lady, in this case Ermengarda. Nicholson writes that "[f]rom the contents of the tornada ... in which Peire reminds [Aimeric] of the duties attached to his position and of the family to which he belongs, it is reasonable to assume that the poem was written during the period when Aimeric was sharing the responsibilities of the government of Narbonne."

== Bibliography ==
- Simon F. Barton. The Aristocracy in Twelfth-century León and Castile. Cambridge: Cambridge University Press, 1997.
- Silvia Orvietani Busch. Medieval Mediterranean Ports: The Catalan and Tuscan Coasts, 1100 to 1235. Leiden: Brill, 2001.
- Derek E. T. Nicholson, ed. The Poems of the Troubadour Peire Rogier. Manchester: Manchester University Press, 1976.
- Antonio Sánchez de Mora. La nobleza castellana en la plena Edad Media: el linaje de Lara (SS. XI–XIII). Doctoral Thesis, University of Seville, 2003.
