= Ferdinand II of León =

King of León and Galicia from 1157 to 1188

Ferdinand II
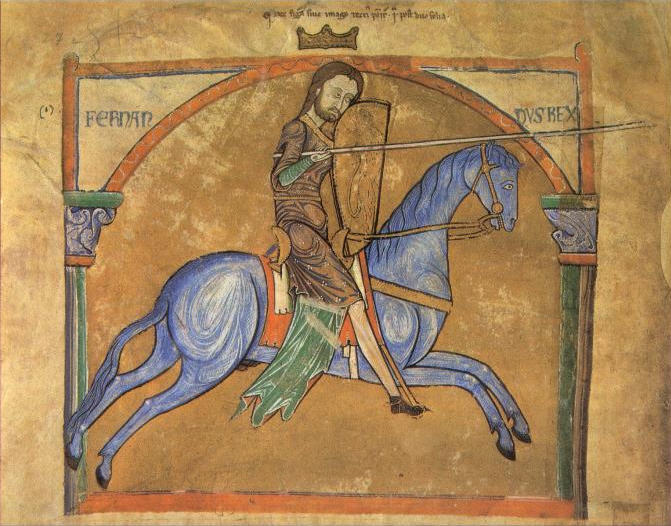
- Ferdinand II in miniature of the Tumbo A of Santiago de Compostela Cathedral

King of León and Galicia
- Reign: 21 August 1157 – 22 January 1188
- Predecessor: Alfonso VII
- Successor: Alfonso IX
- Born: c. 1137
- Died: 22 January 1188 (aged 50–51); Benavente
- Burial: Cathedral of Santiago de Compostela
- Spouses: Urraca of Portugal (m. 1165; ann. 1175): Teresa Fernández de Traba (m. 1177/78; died 1180); Urraca López de Haro (m. 1187)
- Issue among others...: Alfonso IX
- House: Castilian House of Ivrea
- Father: Alfonso VII of León and Castile
- Mother: Berenguela of Barcelona

Ferdinand II (c. 1137 – 22 January 1188), was a member of the Castilian cadet branch of the House of Ivrea and King of León and Galicia (Note: The complete title was Rex Legionensis et Gallecie or Rex Legionensis et Galleciae (King of León and Galicia). He also used the titles of Regis Legionis (King of León), Rex Hispaniae (King of Spain), Rex Hispanorum (King of the Spanish) or Rex Hispaniarum (King of Spain).) from 1157 until his death.

== Life ==
=== Family ===
Born in Toledo, Castile, Ferdinand was the third but second surviving son of King Alfonso VII of León and Castile and Berenguela of Barcelona. His paternal grandparents were Count Raymond of Burgundy and Queen Urraca of León and his maternal grandparents were Ramon Berenguer III, Count of Barcelona, and Douce I, Countess of Provence. He had seven full-siblings, of whom only three survived infancy: the later King Sancho III of Castile, Constance (wife of King Louis VII of France) and Sancha (wife of King Sancho VI of Navarre), and two half-siblings from his father's second marriage with Richeza of Poland, of whom only survive Sancha (wife of King Alfonso II of Aragon).

=== Childhood and early years ===
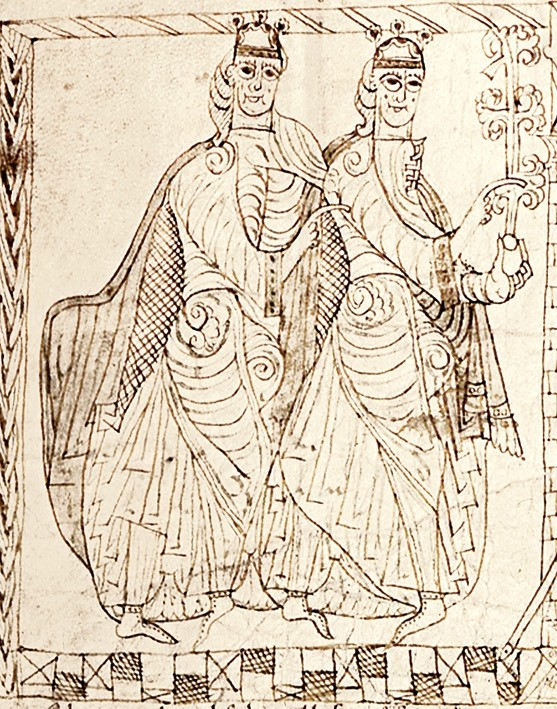
Sancho III of Castile and Ferdinand II of León and Galicia, from a Privilegium Imperatoris of Alfonso VII of León and Castile

Ferdinand's education was entrusted to a Galician magnate, Count Fernando Pérez de Traba, member of the same lineage as the former knights of his grandmother, Queen Urraca, and of the tutors and defenders of his father, King Alfonso VII. Soon he was initiated into the tasks of government. From 1151 he is associated with the throne by his father, along with his older brother Infante Sancho, so in documents from León and Galicia his confirmation with the title of King, or King of Galicia, is common. (Note: "Tenente Gallicie rex Fernandus", 1152 (Colección diplomática de San Martín de Jubia (977–1199). Santiago, 1935); "Adefonsus Ymperator, una cum coniuge sua dona Riga dominante regnante in tota Yspania. Sancius rex in Castella. Fredenandus rex in Galicia. Urraka regina in Asturias", (Colección diplomática del monasterio de Villanueva de Oscos. Oviedo, 1981. doc. 5); "Imperatoris Adefonsus, regis Fernandi imperat Galletia.", 1155, ibid, doc. 6; "Adefonsus dei gratia hispaniarum imperator laudat et confirmat. Sanctius filius eius rex Castelle laudat et confirmat. Fernandus filius eius rex Galletie laudat et confirmat", 1155 (Documentos de la Catedral de Lugo).) He was surrounded from the beginning by the Leonese and Galician magnates, such as the Counts Ponce de Minerva, Ramiro Froilaz, Pedro Alfonso and the aforementioned Fernando Pérez de Traba.

In a council begun in Valladolid in the year 1155, were agreed the terms of the division of the domains of the still-living King Alfonso VII. There the Kingdoms of León and Galicia were assigned under Ferdinand's sovereignty, excluding Tierra de Campos, Sahagún and Asturias de Santillana. Ferdinand earned the reputation of a good knight and hard fighter, but did not display political talent or organising ability.

=== Beginning of reign and first marriage with Urraca of Portugal ===
In 1157 his father, King Alfonso VII died, and according of his will and the previous dispositions of the council of Valladolid of 1155, his second son inherited the Kingdoms of León and Galicia under the name of Ferdinand II; during the early months of his reign, the new monarch had to resolve his disputes with the powerful local nobles and an invasion by his brother Sancho III of Castile. In 1158 Ferdinand II signed the Treaty of Sahagún with his brother Sancho III, under which they agreed to jointly wage war against the Muslims, to divide up the conquered territories, the provision that in case one of the two brothers died without issue, the survivor would inherit the domains of the deceased brother, and the partition of the Kingdom of Portugal. The death of his brother Sancho III in the same year and the succession of his infant son Alfonso VIII, annulled the clauses of the Treaty of Sahagún.

During the minority of age of his nephew Alfonso VIII, in the Kingdom of Castile began the dispute between the Houses of Lara and Castro to exercise the regency on behalf of the child king. Taking advantage of the anarchic state in which the kingdom of his late brother was found, Ferdinand II invaded Castile at the head of an army, and demanded, in order to restore order, that the Lara surrender him to his nephew Alfonso VIII, whose education he wished to take charge of.

In March 1160 Fernando Rodríguez de Castro, commanding the forces of the House of Castro, defeated the Lara supporters in the Battle of Lobregal, in which his father-in-law Count Osorio Martínez lost his life, and Nuño Pérez de Lara was captured. That same year, Ferdinand II was cured of a serious illness supposedly through the intercession of Saints Martin of Tours and Eufemia of Orense. In 1162 Fernando Rodríguez de Castro was appointed Majordomo mayor of Ferdinand II, a position he held twice: firstly from 15 August 1162 until his dismissal on 6 September 1164 and secondly from 19 October 1165 until 15 May 1166.

The boundary troubles with Castile restarted in 1164: he then met at Soria with the Lara family, who represented Alfonso VIII, and a truce was established, allowing him to move against the Muslim Almohads who still held much of southern Spain, and to capture the cities of Alcántara and Alburquerque. In the same year, Ferdinand II defeated King Afonso I of Portugal, who, in 1163, had occupied Salamanca in retaliation for the repopulation of the area ordered by the King of León.

In May/June 1165 Ferdinand II married with Infanta Urraca of Portugal, daughter of King Afonso I, as a gesture of reconciliation and alliance between the Kingdoms of León and Portugal. At that time, he restored and repopulated the cities of Ledesma and Ciudad Rodrigo, and this caused the inhabitants of Salamanca who, apparently, had bought the city of Ledesma, took up arms against the king and the magistrates of Ledesma; when Ferdinand II learned of it, he marched with his army against the rebels and forced them to return to their city.

=== The war against the Kingdom of Castile (1162–1166) ===
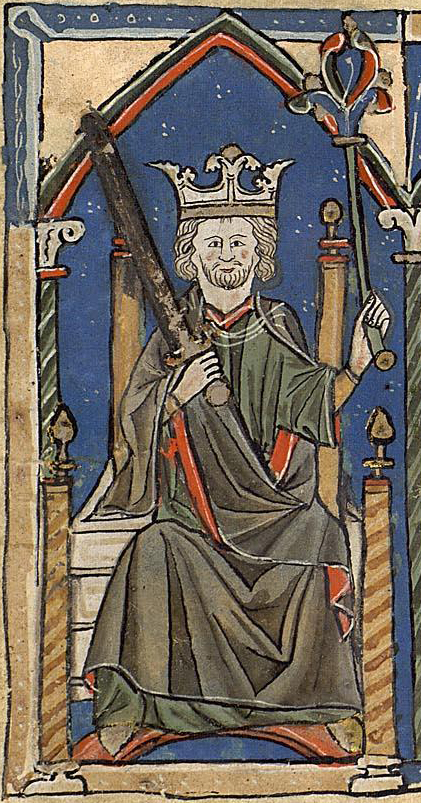
Ferdinand II in miniature of the Tombo de Toxos Outos

In 1162, Ferdinand II conquered the city of Toledo, snatching it from the Castilians, and subsequently naming Fernando Rodríguez de Castro as Governor of the city. The city of Toledo remained in the power of the Kingdom of León until 1166, when it was recovered by the Castilians. On 27 September 1162, Ferdinand II signed an agreement, known as the Treaty of Ágreda, with Alfonso II of Aragon.

In 1164 Fernando Rodríguez de Castro entered the Kingdom of Castile for the second time with an army and defeated Count Manrique Pérez de Lara at the Battle of Huete, fought in June or July of that year. Four years later he was appointed Mayor of León, being his duty to control and be in command of the existing fortresses in the city, until the year 1182, when he left the office.

Ferdinand II and the members of the House of Lara met in Soria and agreed that, to defend the city of Toledo from the Saracens, they would hand over to the Knights Templar the city of Uclés, located in the current Province of Cuenca, and which would later become the headquarters of the Order of Santiago. The King of León, fearful that the members of the House of Lara would break the agreed peace, allied himself with King Sancho VI of Navarre to intimidate them and, in this way, be able to direct his troops against the Almohads, from whom he snatched the cities of Alcántara and Albuquerque.

=== Conquest of Badajoz and war with the Kingdom of Portugal ===
Despite Ferdinand II's marriage to Infanta Urraca of Portugal, the disputes with the Lusitan kingdom continued. Between 1166 and 1168 King Afonso I of Portugal seized cities belonging to the Leonese kingdom. Ferdinand II then repopulated Ciudad Rodrigo, and the Portuguese monarch, suspecting that his son-in-law was fortifying it with the purpose of attacking him in the future, sent an army commanded by his son and heir, Infante Sancho of Portugal, against that city. The King of León came to the aid of the besieged Ciudad Rodrigo and, in a meeting he had with the Portuguese troops, put them to flight, capturing many prisoners. Afonso I then invaded Galicia, occupying Tui and the territory of Xinzo de Limia (former fiefs of his mother), and in 1169 attacked the city of Cáceres. However, as his troops were also besieging the city of Badajoz, which was in the power of the Saracens, Ferdinand II was able to push the Portuguese out of Galicia and to rush to Badajoz. When Afonso I saw the Leonese arrive he tried to flee, but he was disabled by a broken leg caused by a fall from his horse, and made prisoner at one of the city's gates. Afonso I was obliged to surrender as his ransom almost all the conquests he had made in Galicia in the previous year. In the peace signed at Pontevedra the following year, Ferdinand II got back twenty-five castles, and the cities of Cáceres, Badajoz, Trujillo, Santa Cruz de la Sierra and Montánchez, previously lost by León. When in the same years the Almohads laid siege to the Portuguese city of Santarém, Ferdinand II came to help his father-in-law, and helped to free the city from the menace.

At the beginning of the summer of 1169, Geraldo Geraldes Sem Pavor ("without fear"), of the kingdom of Portugal, took the city of Badajoz after a long siege, but the governor of the city took refuge in the Alcazaba of Badajoz, and the siege had to continue. Seeing the opportunity presented to him to add the main city of the region to his dominions at the expense of his Christian and Muslim enemies, Afonso I of Portugal an army to Badajoz in order to replace Gerardo Sem Pavor as conductor of the siege.

Rota of Ferdinand II

The city of Trujillo became the head of the domains assembled by Fernando Rodríguez de Castro. This provoked the opposition of Ferdinand II, who argued that Badajoz belonged to him. The King of León then headed south at the head of an army, at the request of the Almohad caliph Abu Yaqub Yusuf, who had already sent a contingent of 5,000 knights to help his besieged governor. Fernando Rodríguez de Castro, as the monarch's Majordomo, was one of the Leonese leaders of the expedition. The Portuguese who besieged the Alcazaba of Badajoz, were then besieged by the Leonese, fighting broke out in the streets of the city. While trying to escape, Afonso I of Portugal was captured by the men of Ferdinand II, after breaking his leg. At the same time, Leonese monarch captured Gerardo Sem Pavor. After the capture of the city and the Alcazaba of Badajoz by the Leonese, the latter left the city in the hands of their Muslim allies. Gerardo Sem Pavor had to surrender several of the towns he had conquered to the Kingdom of León, in exchange for his freedom. Ferdinand II kept the city of Cáceres, but the towns of Trujillo, Montánchez, Santa Cruz de la Sierra and Monfragüe became the property of Fernando Rodríguez de Castro. (Note: The chronicler Ibn Ṣāḥib al-Ṣalā said that three years after this conquest, between 17 October 1167 and 4 October 1168, Gerardo Sem Pavor was forced to cede Trujillo to a certain Ferdinand, brother-in-law of Ferdinand "the Slimy" (referring to Ferdinand II of León), who was the brother-in-law of Fernando "the Castilian" (the nickname of Fernando Rodríguez de Castro), since the latter had married Stephanie Alfonso "the Unfortunate", half-sister of the King of León. The donation of the cities to Fernando Rodríguez de Castro is also recorded in various Christian sources, such as the Chronica latina regum castellae. The approximate date given by Ibn Ṣāḥib is in disagreement with that of 1169 or 1170, indicated by other sources.) After this donation, Fernando Rodríguez de Castro became the lord of a semi-independent principality located between the Tagus and Guadiana rivers, whose headquarters were in the city of Trujillo. Alfonso VIII realized the strategic importance of the fortresses granted to the Castilian, with a view to a future repopulation, since the fortresses were in the area that according to the Treaty of Sahagún of 1158 belonged to the area of influence of the Kingdom of Castile. (Note: «Alfonso VIII carefully observed the events of Badajoz and especially the delivery to "the Castilian" of the castles of Montánchez, Santa Cruz, Albalat and Zuferola.») Defeated by Afonso I of Portugal, the Muslims attacked the Kingdom of León in 1173, trying to seize Ciudad Rodrigo; but Ferdinand II, who had knowledge of his purposes, entrenched himself in the city of Salamanca with the troops he was able to gather in León, in Zamora, in various places in Galicia and in other parts of the kingdom, at the same time giving order to the rest of his army to meet him asap. The Muslims were defeated and only those who fled could keep their freedom.

In 1170, Ferdinand II created the military-religious Order of Santiago de Compostela, with the task to protect the city of Cáceres. Like the Order of Alcántara, it initially began as a knightly confraternity and took the name "Santiago" (St. James) after St. James the apostle, with the purpose to protect the pilgrims who visited the tomb of the Apostle Santiago.

=== Second marriage with Teresa Fernández de Traba ===
In 1175, Pope Alexander III annulled the marriage of Ferdinand II and Urraca of Portugal because they were related in the prohibited third degree of consanguinity as being second cousins (their grandmothers, Queen Urraca of León and Countess Teresa of Portugal were half-sisters), despite the fact that the Queen gave birth a son and heir, Infante Alfonso, in 1171. The gold of Castile and England countered the one that Leon offered to Rome to obtain the Papal dispensation for the marriage, since its validity supposed de facto the alliance of Portugal and León, which did not interest neither Castile nor to England, who had family ties to each other after Alfonso VIII was married to Eleanor, daughter of King Henry II of England.

After August 1177 and certainly before 7 October 1178, Ferdinand II married with Teresa Fernández de Traba, the illegitimate daughter of Count Fernando Pérez de Traba (the king's former tutor) and Countess Teresa of Portugal, and widow of Count Nuño Pérez de Lara; with this marriage, the king cemented his alliance with the powerful Houses of Lara and Traba —although just like his first marriage, Ferdinand II was also closely related with his new wife in not only a prohibited degree of consanguinity but also of affinity (they were not only 1st cousins once removed but also Teresa Fernández de Traba was aunt of Urraca of Portugal), apparently there wasn't any questioning or impediment for this new wedding of the Leonese monarch.

=== War with the Kingdom of Castile and conference of Tordesillas (1178–1180) ===
In 1178 Ferdinand II invaded the Kingdom of Castile. He seized the municipalities of Castrojeriz and Dueñas (both formerly lands of Teresa Fernández de Traba's first husband) before Alfonso VIII could have put these fortresses on alert, while the Castilian sovereign allied himself with Afonso I of Portugal, who sent his son, Infante Sancho, to fight against the King of León.

In 1180 the Kings of León and Castile met in the town of Tordesillas, where they agreed to put an end to their differences, sealing a peace agreement. On 6 February of that year, Ferdinand II's second wife Teresa Fernández de Traba died giving birth to their second son, who died at the same time as his mother and was buried together with her in the Royal Pantheon of the Kings of San Isidoro of León.

=== Ordination of the territory ===
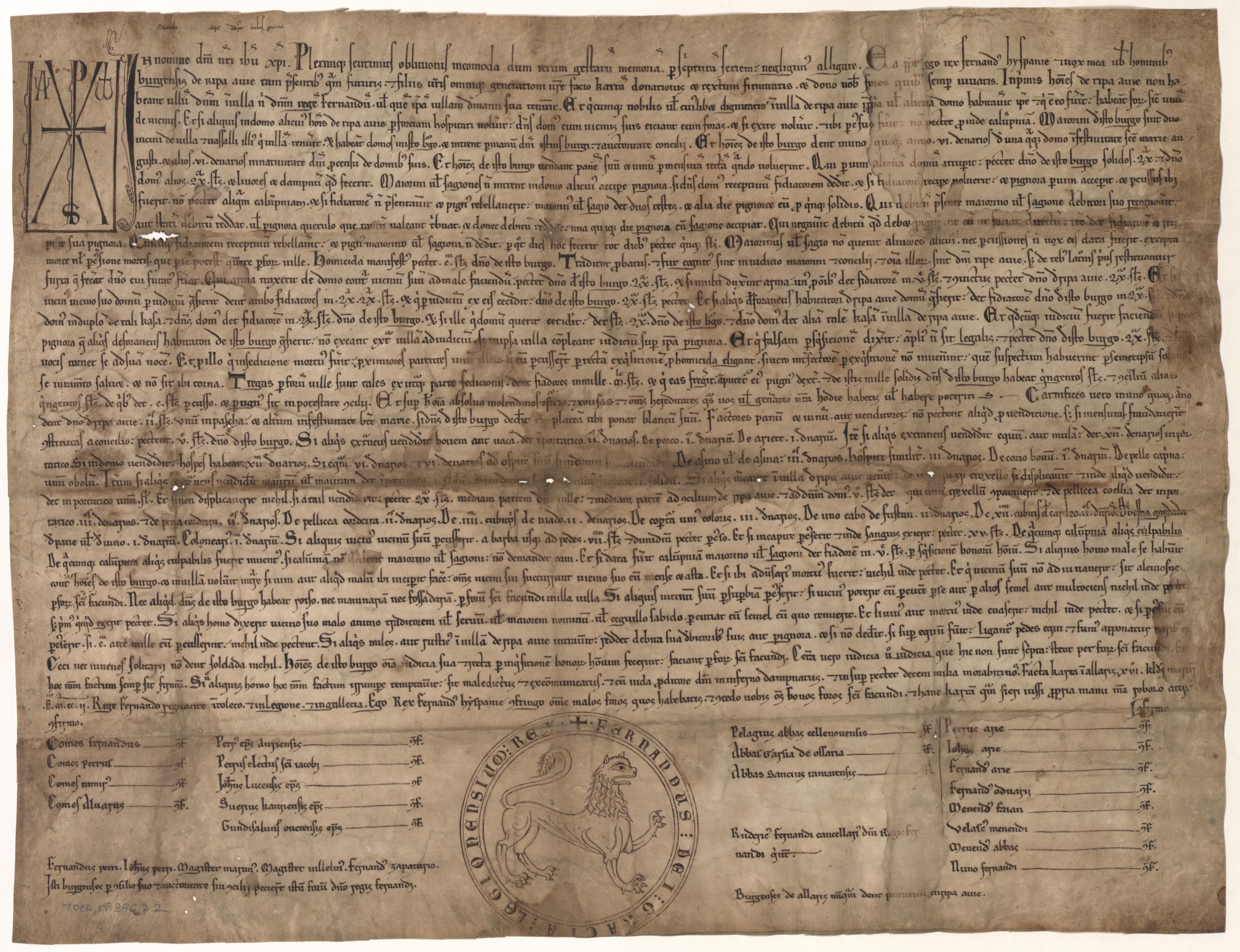
Fuero of Ribadavia

Ferdinand II granted cartas forales to numerous cities and towns; in 1164, to Padrón and Ribadavia; in 1168, to Noia; in 1169 to Castro Caldelas and to the city of Pontevedra; in 1170 to Tui and in 1177 to Lugo. It also favored numerous monasteries, such as those of Sobrado, Melón, Armenteira, Moraime and San Martín de Xubia. It also benefited the Santiago de Compostela Cathedral, granting a life pension to Master Mateo. During his reign the Order of Santiago was founded and Pope Alexander III granted the grace of the Jacobean jubilee holy year (Bula Regis Aeterni, 1181). This privilege granted to the Santiago de Compostela Cathedral favored the heyday of pilgrimages, while promoting the economic, cultural and artistic development of the territories crossed by the Camino de Santiago.

=== Last years – third marriage with Urraca López de Haro ===
In 1184, after a series of failed attempts, the Almohad caliph Abu Yaqub Yusuf invaded Portugal with an army recruited in Northern Africa and, in May, besieged Afonso I in Santarém; the Portuguese were helped by the arrival of the armies sent by the archbishop of Santiago de Compostela, in June, and by Ferdinand II in July.

In May 1187 Ferdinand II married with Urraca López de Haro, daughter of Lope Díaz I de Haro, Lord of Biscay, and widow of Nuño Menéndez, Lord of Ceón and Riaño, who had been his mistress from at least May 1180. On occasion of the wedding, the king granted his new wife the Lordships of Aguilar and Monteagudo. The new queen, who was aware that the end of her husband's life was approaching, wanted to elevate her only surviving son, Infante Sancho, to the throne of León, in detriment of the Infante Alfonso, Ferdinand II's first-born son. To achieve her purpose, Urraca López de Haro maintained that the birth of Infante Alfonso was illegitimate, since the marriage of his parents had been annulled due to the existing blood ties between both spouses. Ferdinand II then banished Infante Alfonso, which was a triumph for his stepmother, who made an effort to ensure that her son inherited the throne upon the death of his father.

=== Death and burial ===
Ferdinand II died at Benavente on 22 January 1188 aged 51, while returning from a pilgrimage to Santiago de Compostela, and was succeeded to the throne by his eldest son, Alfonso IX of León. (Note: «Ferdinand II died in Benavente, on 22 January 1188; on 26 according to the ancient calendar of the church of León.») The Primera Crónica General describes the death of the King of León as follows:

And this King Ferdinand of León, son of the Emperor and brother of King Sancho de Castile, finished already with good progress in the XXI year of his reign in his kingdom, near the town of Benavente: and they buried him in the church of Sant Yague de Gallizia [Basilica of San Isidoro], near his grandfather Count Raymund who lies and, near the Empress Berengaria his mother...This was made by the heir of Leon Infante Alfonso, son of King Ferdinand and Queen Urraca, daughter of King Afonso of Portugal.

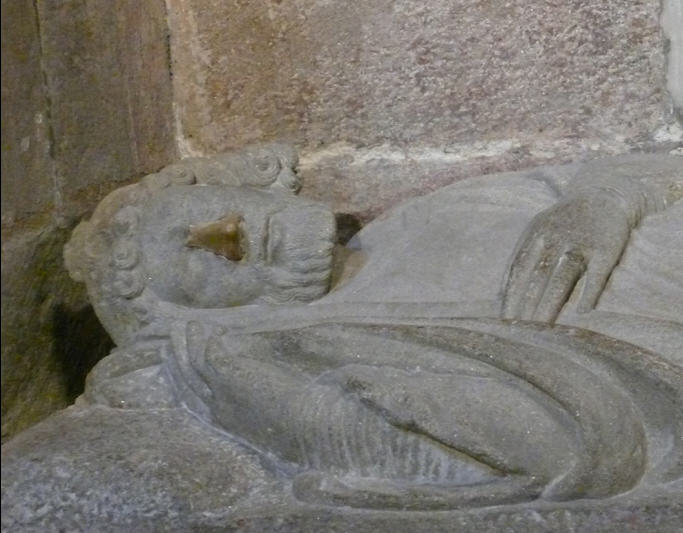
Sepulcher of Ferdinand II in the Chapel of the Relics at Santiago de Compostela Cathedral

Contravening his wishes to be buried at Santiago de Compostela Cathedral, Ferdinand II was buried somewhere, possibly in the Royal Pantheon of the Kings of San Isidoro of León, since his widow, Queen Urraca, did not want to transfer the mortal remains to Santiago of Compostela, since its Archbishop, Pedro Suárez de Deza, was a supporter of King Alfonso IX.

Later, his remains were transferred by order of his son Alfonso IX to Santiago de Compostela Cathedral, in which Ferdinand II had stated that he wanted to be buried, since there where buried his mother Queen Berengaria of Barcelona and his grandfather Count Raymond of Burgundy, and, therefore, in a document granted in the city of Benavente on 26 July 1180, confirmed to Santiago de Compostela Cathedral the donations that the sovereign had granted him previously, and that concerned the chaplaincy and the royal tombs of the cathedral, also ordering in said document that no one can build any castle in that territory.

The transfer of the remains of Ferdinand II is mentioned in a diploma granted in Zamora by Alfonso IX dated 4 May 1188, which certifies that the royal remains were transferred to Santiago de Compostela Cathedral by order of his son, who wished to fulfill the last wishes of his father, and buried next to the remains of the Apostle Santiago with royal honors, while confirming in said document the privileges and exemptions granted to the cathedral by the soul of his deceased father, and his own.

The tomb of Ferdinand II is located in the Chapel of the Relics of Santiago de Compostela Cathedral, where the Royal Pantheon is located. On a smooth stone sepulcher is placed the recumbent statue that represents the late king, who appears dressed in a tunic and mantle, his forehead girded with a royal crown, and his head is represented with curly hair and a beard, with the right arm of the sovereign raised and placed at the height of his head, while his left hand rests on his chest. The recumbent statue representing Ferdinand II has been dated to the first half of the 13th century. It was carried out after the death of the king, who died in 1188, which has led to the conclusion that it should have been commissioned by the king's heir, Alfonso IX of León. (Note: «It is a work after the date of the king's death (1188). Surely his son Alfonso IX commissioned it around the year 1200, when he was in his early thirties.»)

== Issue ==
Ferdinand II and his first wife, Urraca of Portugal, had one son:

- Alfonso IX (15 August 1171 – 23/24 September 1230), who eventually succeeded him as King of León and Galicia

Ferdinand II and his second wife, Teresa Fernández de Traba, had two sons:

- Ferdinand (1178–1187), who died in infancy and was buried in the Royal Pantheon of the Kings of San Isidoro of León
- Sancho (born and died 6 February 1180), whose birth led to the death of his mother and also buried in the Royal Pantheon of the Kings of San Isidoro of León

Ferdinand II and his third wife, Urraca López de Haro, had three sons:

- García Fernández (1182–1184), died before the marriage of his parents, buried in the Royal Pantheon of the Kings of San Isidoro of León
- Alfonso Fernández (1184–1188), legitimized through the subsequent marriage of his parents, died before his father and was also buried in the Royal Pantheon of the Kings of San Isidoro of León
- Sancho Fernández (1186 – 25 August 1220), legitimized through the subsequent marriage of his parents, Lord of Monteagudo and Aguilar in succession to his mother, alférez mayor of his half-brother King Alfonso IX on 10 June 1213, and from 8 December 1213 to 16 July 1218, governor of Montenegro and Sarría during 1210–1219

== Notes ==
Ferdinand II of León Castilian House of Ivrea Cadet branch of the House of Ivrea Born: circa 1137 Died: 22 January 1188
Regnal titles
Preceded by Alfonso VII	King of León and Galicia; 1157–1188	Succeeded by Alfonso IX
