= Montpezat, Gers =

Montpezat
- Commune
- Coat of arms
- Location of Montpezat
- Location within France Location within Occitanie
- Coordinates: 43°23′44″N 0°58′07″E
- Country: France
- Region: Occitania
- Department: Gers
- Arrondissement: Auch
- Canton: Val de Save
- Intercommunality: Savès

Government
  - Mayor (2020–2026): Guy Larée
- Area^{1}: 15.64 km^{2} (6.04 sq mi)
- Elevation: 320 m (1,050 ft)
- Highest elevation: 346 m (1,135 ft)
- Lowest elevation: 198 m (650 ft)
- Population (2023): 237
  - Density: 15.2/km^{2} (39.2/sq mi)
- Time zone: UTC+01:00 (CET)
  - Summer (DST): UTC+02:00 (CEST)
- INSEE/Postal code: 32289 /32220
- ^{1} French Land Register data, which excludes lakes, ponds, glaciers > 1 km^{2} (0.386 sq mi or 247 acres) and river estuaries.

Montpezat (before 2023: Montpézat; Occitan: Montpesat) is a commune in the Gers department in southwestern France.

== Geography ==
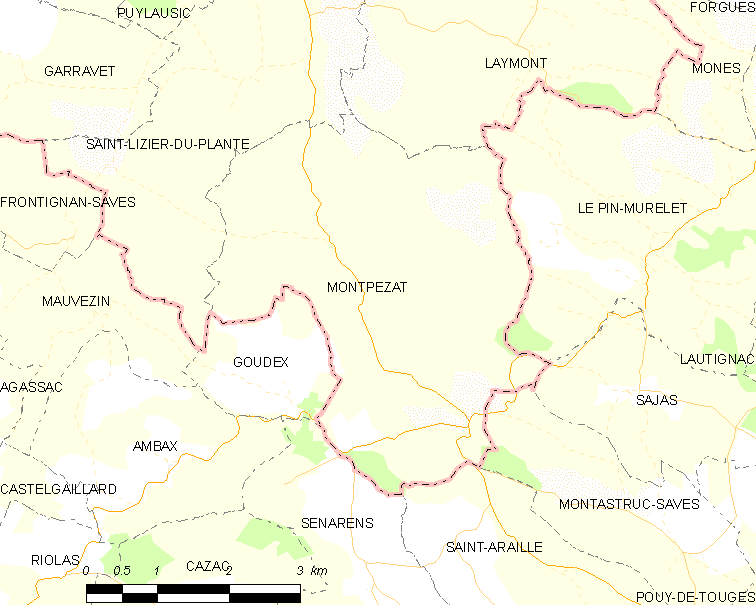
Montpezat and its surrounding communes

== Population ==
Historical population
Year	Pop.	±% p.a.
1968	280	—
1975	217	−3.58%
1982	236	+1.21%
1990	214	−1.22%
1999	194	−1.08%
2007	239	+2.64%
2012	240	+0.08%
2017	242	+0.17%
2023	237	−0.35%
Source: INSEE

== See also ==
- Communes of the Gers department
- Savès
