= Dueñas, Palencia =

Coordinates: 41°53′N 4°33′W

Dueñas
- Municipality
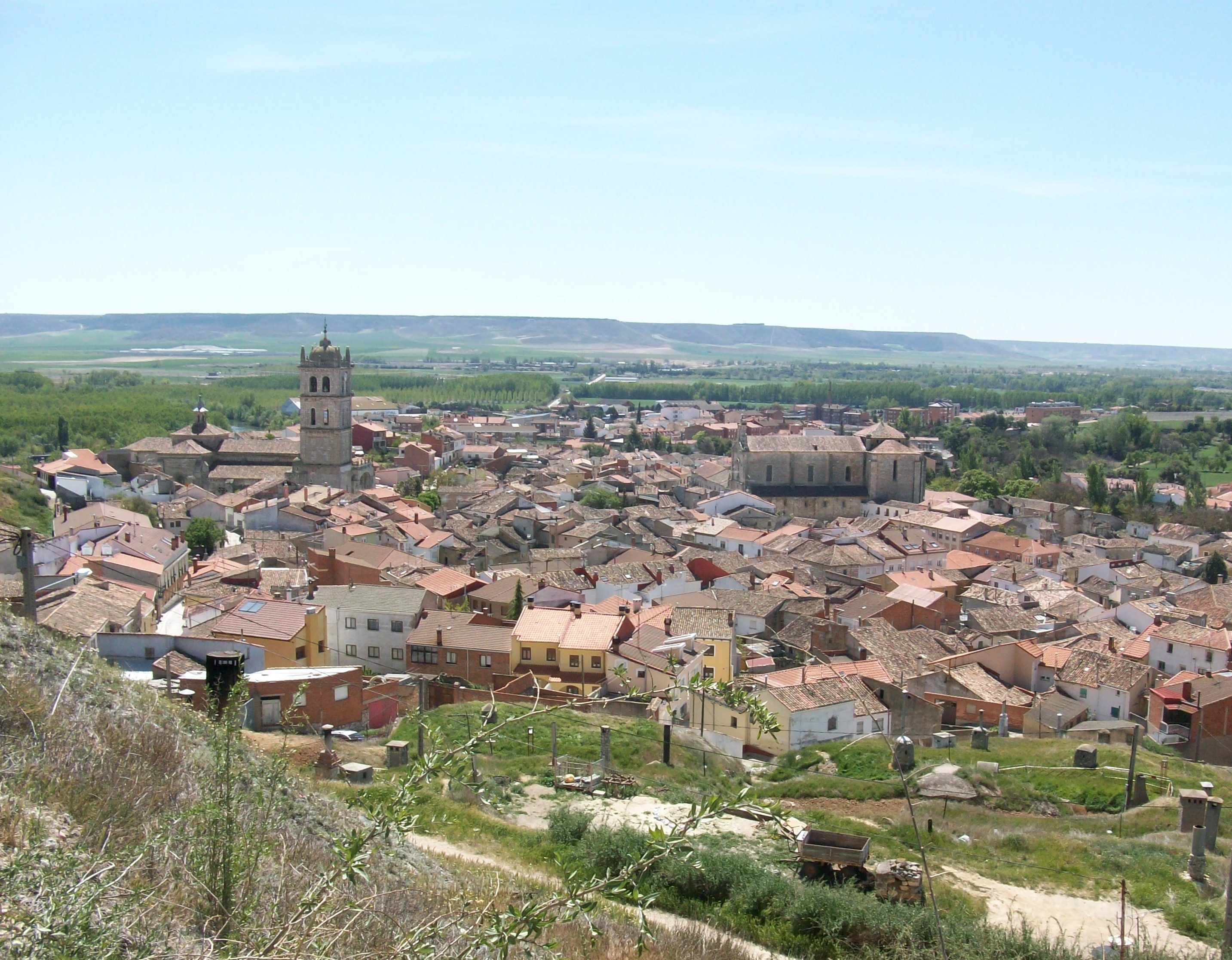

- Coat of arms
- Interactive map of Dueñas
- Country: Spain
- Autonomous community: Castile and León
- Province: Palencia
- Municipality: Dueñas

Area
  - Total: 124.35 km^{2} (48.01 sq mi)

Population (2025-01-01)
  - Total: 2,605
  - Density: 20.95/km^{2} (54.26/sq mi)
- Time zone: UTC+1 (CET)
  - Summer (DST): UTC+2 (CEST)
- Website: Official website

Dueñas is a municipality in the province of Palencia, Castile and León, Spain.
