= House of Castro =

Iberian noble family

- Noble family
- Current region: Spain; Portugal; Italy; France
- Founder: Fernando García de Hita
- Titles: Count of Lemos; Marquess of Sarria; Count of Andrade; Count of Villalba; Count of Castro; Grandee of Spain; Duke of Taurisano

The House of Castro is a Spanish noble lineage, originally from the Kingdom of Castile. Its origin likely comes from the village of Castrojeriz in Burgos.

== History ==
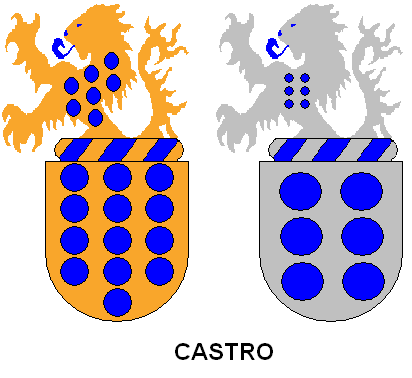
The arms of Portuguese and Galician branches of the House of Castro

The first clearly identified member of the family was early-12th century count Fernando García de Hita, a kinsman and vassal of Urraca of León and Castile. This kinship, along with his patronymic, have led to his being considered an illegitimate son of Urraca's uncle García II of Galicia. More recently, it has been suggested that he was the son of count García Ordóñez by the infanta Urraca Garcés of Navarre, and perhaps scion of the Banu Gómez clan.

During the reign of Alfonso VIII, the Castro family, under Gutierrez Fernandez, rivaled another major Castilian family, the House of Lara, for power in the kingdom of Castile.

The lack of heirs in the senior line resulted in the rise of a cadet branch seated in Galicia. This branch became the most powerful of the Galician nobility, and one of the most powerful in Spain. Traditionally linked to the county of Lemos, the most illustrious representatives were the "Great Count of Lemos" and his uncle, Cardinal Rodrigo de Castro Osorio. Another scion, Pedro Antonio Fernández de Castro is still well remembered in Peru.

The House of Castro became one of the most powerful families of the Spanish and Portuguese nobility. The House of Castro went into decline because of their lack of offspring, with the county of Lemos passing to the House of Alba. The coat of the Galician branch of the House of Castro were six blue roundels on a silver field. The Portuguese branch used a variant that included thirteen roundels on gold.
