= Osorio Martínez =

Osorio Martínez (Latin: Osorius Martini) (bef. 1108 – March 1160) was a magnate from the Province of León in the Empire of Alfonso VII. He served as the emperor militarily throughout his long career, which peaked in 1138–41. Besides the documentary sources, which are somewhat meagre at times after his fall from royal favour, he is mentioned in two episodes in the Chronica Adefonsi imperatoris. He supported Ferdinand II of León after Alfonso's death (1157), but he died in a Castilian civil war in 1160.

== Early military career (1124–1138) ==
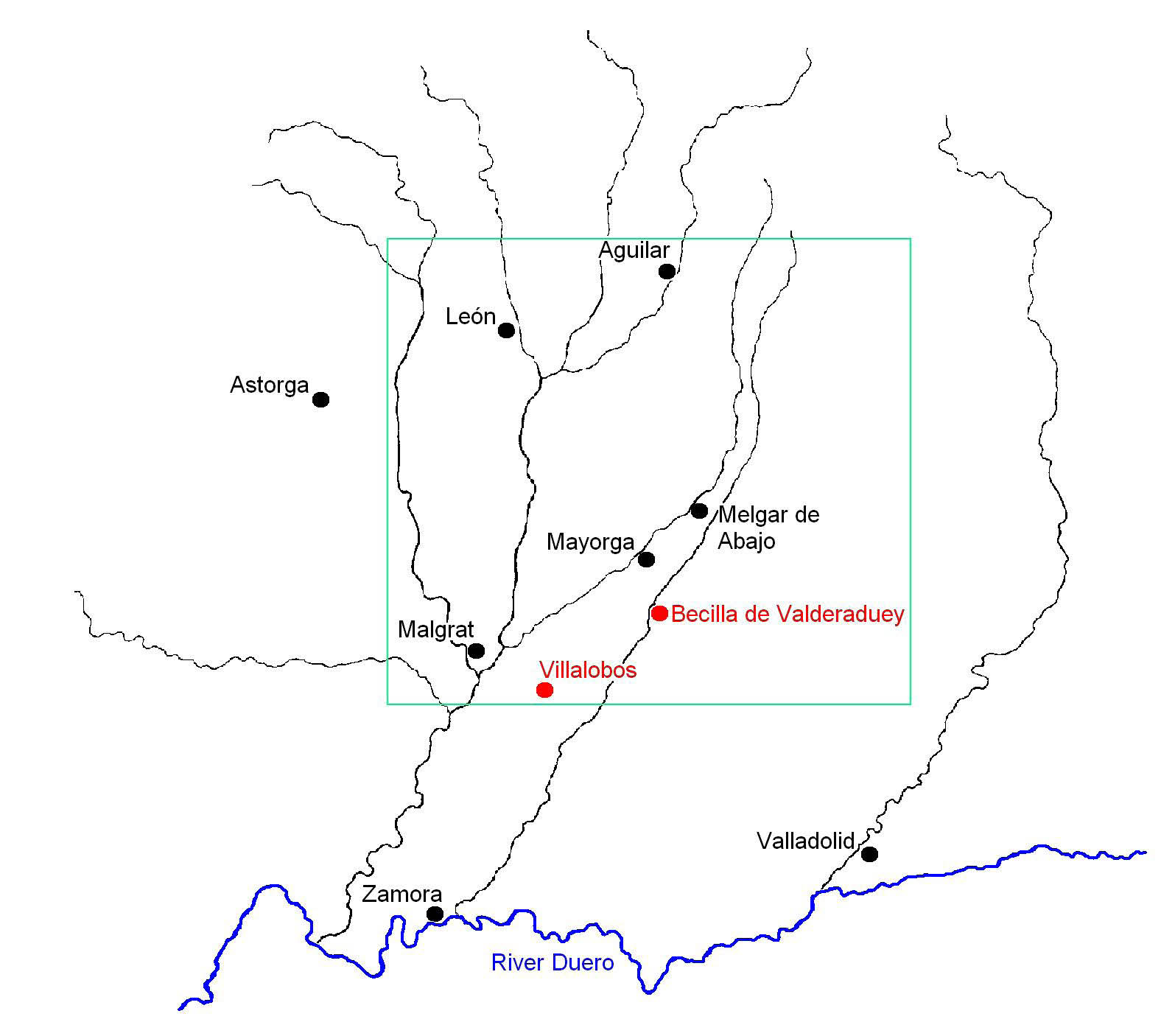
Osorio's tenencias were concentrated around the city of León (green box), although by c.1150 he was left holding only a few small tenencias (red) in the south of the province, towards the river Duero and the city of Zamora, which he may have held briefly.

Osorio was the second son of Martín Flaínez of the Flagínez family and Sancha Fernández. In 1124 Osorio was granted the tenencia of Melgar de Abajo. In 1126 he joined the other noblemen of the Leonese province in swearing an oath of fealty to the new king Alfonso VII at the capital city of León. Five years later (1129) he received Malgrat. The next year (1130) he received the tenencias of Riba Cetera and Villamayor, later also that of Ribera, but these he lost sometime between 1135 and 1137. As early as 1131 he was governing Mayorga and by 1135 the Liébana as well. In 1130 he and his brother Rodrigo were dispatched to besiege the rebel Pedro Díaz in a place called Valle. The Chronica Adefonsi records the campaign:

The King of León ordered Count Rodrigo Martinez and his brother Osorio to go to León. They were to attack Pedro Díaz who was rebelling in Valle. Díaz had with him a large number of knights and soldiers. Rodrigo and Osorio arrived there and encircled the castle. Those inside continued to shout insults at Rodrigo and his brother because they were unable to counterattack them successfully. When this was reported to Alfonso VII, he hurried to the town of Valle. He commanded that mantlets and numerous other war machines be constructed around the castle. The King's forces commenced to hurl rocks and arrows at those inside. Subsequently, the castle walls were completely destroyed.

== Rise and fall (1138–1147) ==
In July 1138 Rodrigo died at the Siege of Coria and the king immediately appointed Osorio count (comes) in his place and granted his tenencias of León, Aguilar, Campos, and perhaps Zamora. Osorio and his brother's erstwhile vassals carried Rodrigo's body to the city of León for burial in the family mausoleum beside his parents. There they buried him in a church next to the Cathedral of Santa María, possibly the monastery of San Pedro de los Huertos, which his parents had received by a royal grant of Urraca of Zamora and Elvira of Toro in 1099. Osorio held numerous property interests in the city of León. Osorio's succession to his brother and the burial of Rodrigo are recorded in the Chronica Adefonsi:

Alfonso gathered all of his advisors, and in their presence, he appointed Osorio, Rodrigo's brother, to be consul in his place. . . . Count Osorio, the new consul, took the body of his brother to León. He was accompanied by his own military force and by that of his brother. The mourning over the death of Rodrigo Martínez increased in every city. In León they buried him with honors in his father's tomb near the Basilica of Saint Mary. The tomb is located very near the episcopal throne.

Sometime before 28 January 1141, Osorio married Teresa, daughter of Fernando Fernández de Carrión and Elvira, a daughter of Alfonso VI of León. They had five daughters and three sons: Aldonza, Constanza, Elvira, Fernando, Gonzalo, Jimena (second wife of Rodrigo Gutiérrez Girón), Rodrigo, and Sancha. (Calderón Medina and Ferreira suggest an additional child, Portuguese nobleman Monio Osores of Cabreira and Ribeira.) From January 1139 to the summer of 1141 Osorio was regularly at court. On 22 February 1140 he was at Carrión de los Condes to witness the treaty between Alfonso VII and Raymond Berengar IV of Barcelona. But in the summer of 1141 he fell from favour and his tenencias were confiscated (Melgar, Malgrat, Mayorga, Liébana, León, Aguilar, Campos, Zamora). Among the few tenencias he was left with were Peñafiel (1146), Villafrechós (1147–59), Villalobos (1147–59), Becilla de Valderaduey (1151–57), Cotanes (1155), and Arales (1157). After June 1142 Osorio rarely visited the royal court. In May 1146 he visited the court of Alfonso I of Portugal, perhaps as an exile.

== Later life (1147–1160) ==
By 1147 Osorio was back in favour. He granted fueros to the villages of Benafarces and Villalonso with the approval of the king. The villages in turn were required to make an annual payment in kind of half a sheep, ten loaves of bread, some barley, and some must. Later that year he accompanied Alfonso VII on expeditions to Calatrava and Almería. On 22 October 1148 he granted the village of Mansilla Mayor to Juan Juliánez and his wife Sol in recognition of their faithful service to him. That same year Osorio and his wife made a donation to the monastery of Gradefes and received in return a greyhound.

In 1159 Osorio and Teresa granted a third of the tithes of the churches of Villalonso, Benafarces, Carvajosa, Grallarejos and Pozoantiguo, which they claimed to own by hereditary right, to the Cathedral of Zamora. They also patronised the Benedictine monasteries at Aguilar (1141) and Sahagún (1123) and the monastery of Vega, which belonged to the Order of Fontevraud (1147).

Osorio died at the hands of his son-in-law, Fernando Rodríguez de Castro, husband of his daughter Constanza, at the Battle of Lobregal in March 1160, fighting on the side of the House of Lara in the civil war for control of the regency of the young Alfonso VIII. Osorio's widow continued to rule Villalobos, at least until 3 November 1167. She also made property grants to the Hospitallers in 1161 and 1163.
