= Fuero =

Spanish legal term and concept

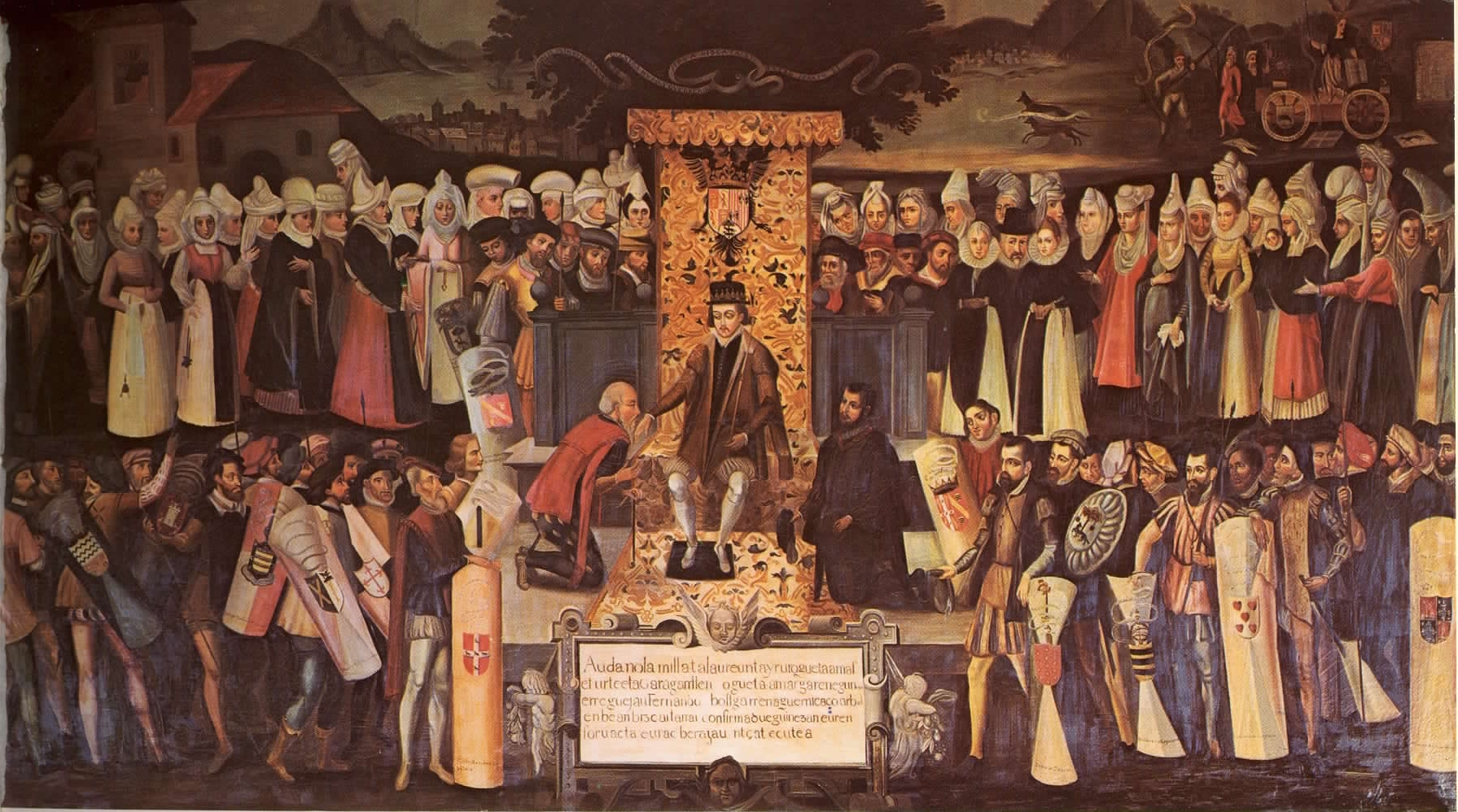
Ferdinand the Catholic confirming the fueros of Biscay at Guernica in 1476

Fuero (Spanish: [ˈfweɾo]), Fur (Catalan: [ˈfuɾ]), Foro (Galician: [ˈfɔɾʊ]), Foru (Basque: [foɾu]) or Fueru (Asturian: ['fwerʊ]) is a Spanish legal term and concept. The word comes from Latin forum, an open space used as a market, tribunal and meeting place. The same Latin root is the origin of the French terms for and foire, and the Portuguese terms foro and foral; all of these words have related, but somewhat different meanings.

The Spanish term fuero has a wide range of meanings, depending upon its context. It has meant a compilation of laws, especially a local or regional one; a set of laws specific to an identified class or estate (for example fuero militar, comparable to a military code of justice, or fuero eclesiástico, specific to the Roman Catholic Church).

In the 20th century, Francisco Franco's regime used the term fueros for several of the fundamental laws. The term implied these were not constitutions subject to debate and change by a sovereign people, but orders from the only legitimate source of authority, as in feudal times.

== Characteristics ==
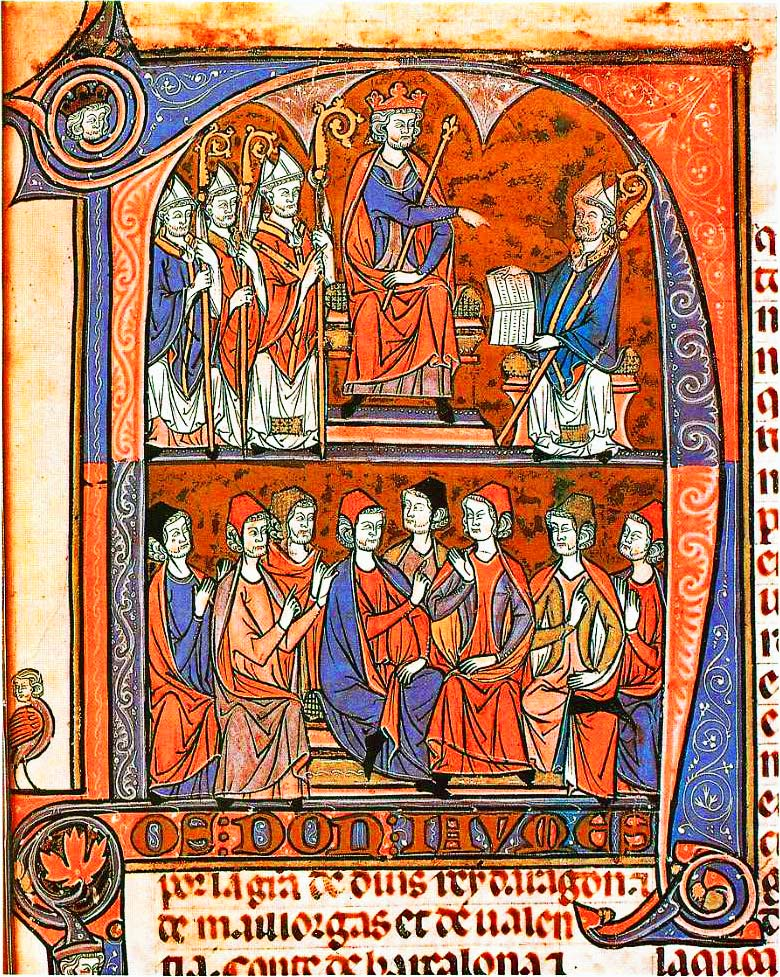
King James I of Aragon receives from Vidal de Canyelles, Bishop of Huesca, the first compilation of the Furs d'Aragó (the "Fueros of Aragon"), 1247

Fuero dates back to the medieval period: the lord could concede or acknowledge a fuero to certain groups or communities, most notably the Roman Catholic Church, the military, and certain regions that fell under the same monarchy as Castile or, later, Spain, but were not fully integrated into those countries.

The relations among fueros, other bodies of law (including the role of precedent), and sovereignty is a contentious one that influences government and law in the present day. The king of León, Alfonso V, decreed the Fuero de León (1017), considered the earliest laws governing territorial and local life, as it applied to the entire kingdom, with certain provisions for the city of León. The most complete medieval fuero is that of the city of Cuenca. The various Basque provinces also generally regarded their fueros as tantamount to a municipal constitution. This view was accepted by some others, including President of the United States John Adams. He cited the Biscayan fueros as a precedent for the United States Constitution. (Adams, A defense…, 1786) This view regards fueros as granting or acknowledging rights. In the contrasting view, fueros were privileges granted by a monarch. In the letter Adams also commented on the substantial independence of the hereditary Basque Jauntxo families as the origin for their privileges.

In practice, distinct fueros for specific classes, estates, towns, or regions usually arose out of feudal power politics. Some historians believe monarchs were forced to concede some traditions in exchange for the general acknowledgment of his or her authority, that monarchs granted fueros to reward loyal subjection, or (especially in the case of towns or regions) the monarch simply acknowledged distinct legal traditions.

In medieval Castilian law, the king could assign privileges to certain groups. The classic example of such a privileged group was the Roman Catholic Church: the clergy did not pay taxes to the state, enjoyed the income via tithes of local landholding, and were not subject to the civil courts. Church-operated ecclesiastical courts tried churchmen for criminal offenses. Another example was the powerful Mesta organization, composed of wealthy sheepherders, who were granted vast grazing rights in Andalusia after that land was reconquered by Spanish Christians from the Muslims (see Reconquista). Lyle N. McAlister writes in Spain and Portugal in the New World that the Mesta's fuero helped impede the economic development of southern Spain. This resulted in a lack of opportunity, and Spaniards emigrated to the New World to escape these constraints.

== Aristocratic fueros ==
During the Reconquista, the feudal lords granted fueros to some villas and cities, to encourage the colonization of the frontier and of commercial routes. These laws regulated the governance and the penal, process and civil aspects of the places. Often the fueros already codified for one place were granted to another, with small changes, instead of crafting a new redaction from scratch.

=== List of aristocratic fueros ===
Date
1125
1127–47
1129
1133
1145
1147
1152
c. 1154
1157
1169
1173
1173
1175
1181
1198
1198

Grantor(s)
Gutierre Fernández de Castro and Toda Díaz
Pedro González de Lara and Eva
Estefanía Sánchez
Alfonso VII
Íñigo Jiménez
Osorio Martínez and Teresa Fernández
María Fernández
Manrique Pérez de Lara
Martín and Elvira Pérez
Sancha Ponce
Ponce de Minerva
Gonzalo, Constanza and Jimena Osorio
Pedro Pérez and Fernando Cídez
Ermengol VII of Urgell
Gutierre Díaz
Froila Ramírez and Sancha

Grantee(s)
San Cebrián de Campos
Tardajos
Villarmildo
Guadalajara
Yanguas
Villalonso and Benafarces
Castrocalbón
Molina
Pozuelo de la Orden
Villarratel
Azaña
Villalobos
Almaraz de Duero
Barruecopardo
Villavaruz de Ríoseco
Cifuentes de Rueda

== Basque and Pyrenean fueros ==
=== Approach ===
In contemporary Spanish usage, the word fueros most often refers to the historic and contemporary fueros or charters of certain regions, especially of the Basque regions. The equivalent for Occitan usage is fòr, applying to the northern regions of the Pyrenees.

The whole central and western Pyrenean region was inhabited by the Basques in the early Middle Ages within the Duchy of Vasconia. The Basques and the Pyrenean peoples—as Romance language replaced Basque in many areas by the turn of the first millennium—governed themselves by a native set of rules, different from Roman and Gothic law but with an ever-increasing imprint of them. Typically their laws, arising from regional traditions and practices, were kept and transmitted orally. Because of this oral tradition, the Basque-language regions preserved their specific laws longer than did those Pyrenean regions that adopted Romance languages. For example, Navarrese law developed along less feudal lines than those of surrounding realms. The Fors de Bearn are another example of Pyrenean law.

Two sayings address this legal idiosyncrasy: "en Navarra hubo antes leyes que reyes," and "en Aragón antes que rey hubo ley," both meaning that law developed and existed before the kings. The force of these principles required monarchs to accommodate to the laws. This situation sometimes strained relations between the monarch and the kingdom, especially if the monarchs were alien to native laws.

This tradition of "laws before kings" was enshrined in the legendary Fueros de Sobrarbe, claimed to have been enacted by king Iñigo Arista in the 850s in the pyrenean valley of Sobrarbe. Although a 13th-century fabrication, the Fueros de Sobrarbe were subsequently used as the legal foundation for most Navarrese and Aragonese Fueros from the 13th century onwards. They enshrined the traditional principle "laws before kings" both in Aragonese and Navarrese law, justified the right to rebel against illegal royal decisions, and legitimised the existence of specific institutions such as the Justicia de Aragón.

=== Fueros in the High and Late Middle Ages ===
The Fueros de Sobrarbe first appear mentioned in the context of the ascension of the House of Champagne to the Navarrese throne. In 1234, when Theobald I of Champagne inherited the Navarrese throne from his uncle Sancho VII of Navarre, he was pressured by burgers and nobility alike to swear he would abide his decisions by customary law and honour their customary rights and privileges. As a result, Theobald I appointed a commission to codify said laws; this resulted in the first written general fuero, the Fuero General de Navarra, enacted in 1238 and which drew its legal foundation from the fabled Fueros of Sobrarbe to justify the king's authority being subjected to the Fuero.

The accession of French lineages to the throne of Navarre brought a relationship between the king and the kingdom that was alien to the Basques. The resulting disagreements were a major factor in the 13th-century uprisings and clashes between different factions and communities, e.g. the borough wars of Pamplona. The loyalty of the Basques (the Navarri) to the king was conditioned on his upholding the traditions and customs of the kingdom, which were based on oral laws.

=== Relations with the crown and rise of absolutism ===
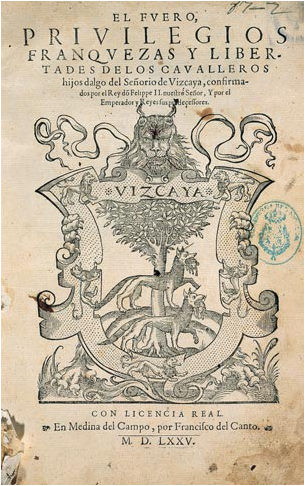
Fuero or law compilation of Biscay (16th century)

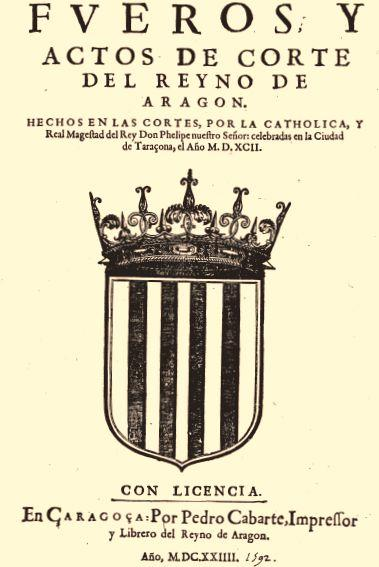
Compilation of the Fueros and Acts of Aragon (1592)

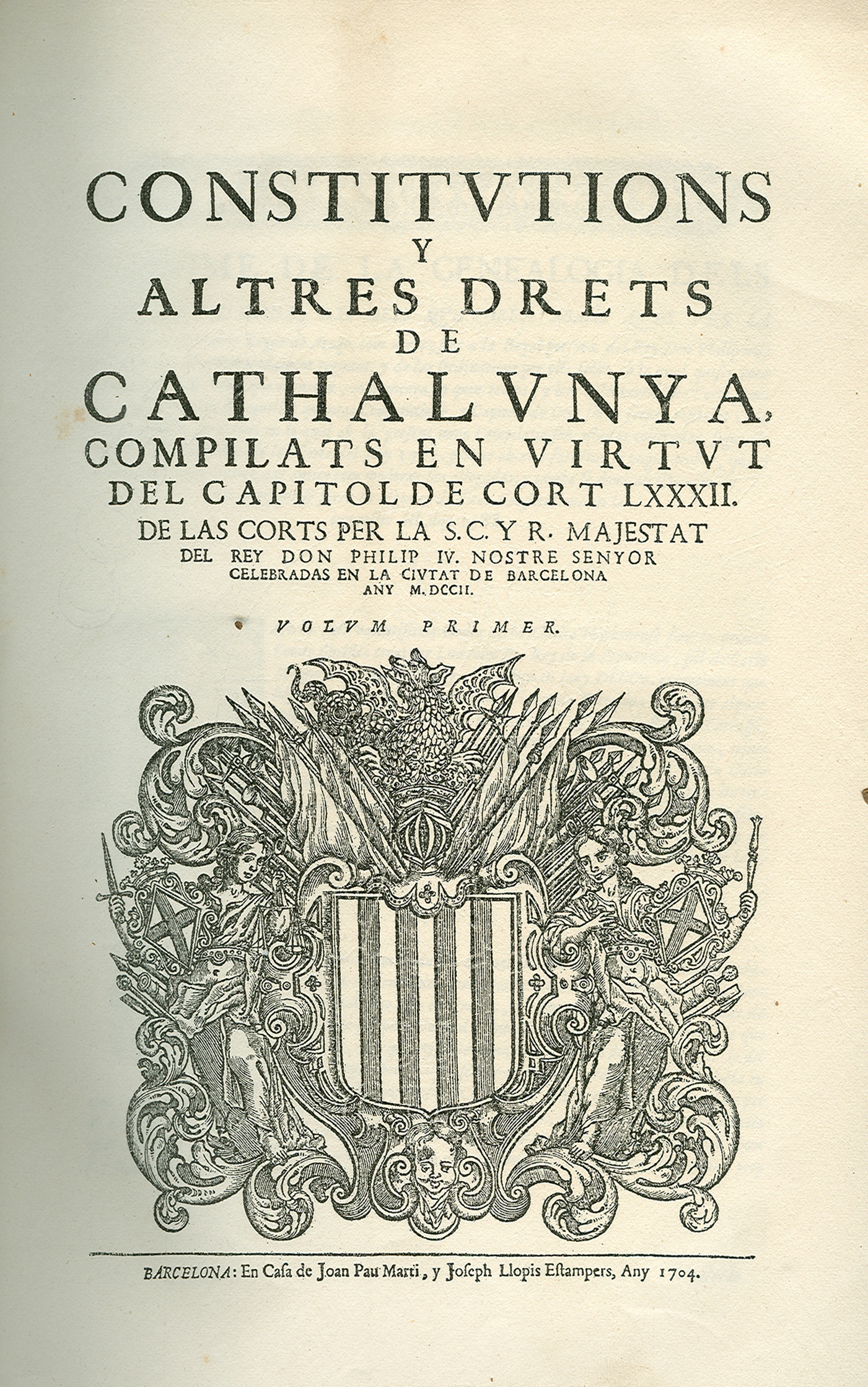
1704 compilation of the Constitutions of Catalonia

Ferdinand II of Aragon conquered and annexed Navarre between 1512 and 1528 (up to the Pyrenees). In order to gain Navarrese loyalty, the Spanish Crown represented by the Aragonese Fernando upheld the kingdom's specific laws (fueros) allowing the region to continue to function under its historic laws, while Lower Navarre remained independent, but increasingly tied to France, a process completed after King Henry III of Navarre and IV of France died. Louis XIII failed to respect his father's will to keep Navarre and France separate. All specific relevant legal provisions and institutions (Parliament, Courts of Justice, etc.) were devalued in 1620–1624, and critical powers transferred to the French Crown.

Since the high Middle Ages, many Basques had been born into the hidalgo nobility. The Basques had no uniform legal corpus of laws, which varied between valleys and seigneuries. Early on (14th century) all Gipuzkoans were granted noble status, several Navarrese valleys (Salazar, Roncal, Baztan, etc.) followed suit, and Biscaynes saw their universal nobility confirmed in 1525. Álava's distribution of nobility was patchy but less widespread, since the Basque specific nobility only took hold in northern areas (Ayala, etc.). Biscaynes, as nobles, were theoretically excluded from torture and from the need to serve in the Spanish army, unless called for the defence of their own territory (Don Quixote's character, Sancho Panza, remarked humorously that writing and reading and being Biscayne was enough to be secretary to the emperor). Other Basque regions had similar provisions. The reach of the fuero was not limited by the territory. Biscayans in other parts of the Crown of Castile had extraterritoriality. They could take the appellations in cases involving them to the Sala de Vizcaya ("Biscay Hall") at the top court of Castile, the Chancillería de Valladolid ("Court of last resort (lit. '"chancery') of Valladolid").

The Castilian kings took an oath to comply with the Basque laws in the different provinces of Álava, Biscay and Gipuzkoa. These provinces and Navarre kept their self-governing bodies and their own parliaments, i.e. the diputaciones and the territorial councils/Parliament of Navarre. However, the prevailing Castilian rule prioritized the king's will. In addition, the ever more centralizing absolutism, especially after the accession to the throne of the Bourbons, increasingly devalued the laws specific to regions and realms—Basque provinces and the kingdoms of Navarre and Aragon—sparking uprisings (Matalaz's uprising in Soule 1660, regular Matxinada revolts in the 17-18th centuries) and mounting tensions between the territorial governments and the Spanish central government of Charles III and Charles IV, to the point of considering the Parliament of Navarre dangerous to the royal authority and condemning "its spirit of independence and liberties."

Despite vowing loyalty to the crown, the Pyrenean Aragonese and Catalans kept their separate specific laws too, the "King of the Spains" represented a crown tying together different realms and peoples, as claimed by the Navarrese diputación, as well as the Parliament of Navarre's last trustee. The Aragonese fueros were an obstacle for Philip II when his former secretary Antonio Pérez escaped the death penalty by fleeing to Aragon. The king's only means to enforce the sentence was the Spanish Inquisition, the only cross-kingdom tribunal of his domains. There were frequent conflicts of jurisdiction between the Spanish Inquisition and regional civil authorities and bishops. Pérez escaped to France, but Philip's army invaded Aragon and executed its authorities.

In 1714 the Catalan and Aragonese specific laws and self-government were violently suppressed. The Aragonese count of Robres, one strongly opposing the abolition, put it down to Castilian centralism, stating that the royal prime minister, the Count-Duke of Olivares, had at last a free rein "for the kings of Spain to be independent of all laws save those of their own conscience."

The Basques managed to retain their specific status for a few years after 1714, as they had supported the claimant who became Philip V of Spain, a king hailing from the lineage of Henry III of Navarre. However, they could not escape the king's attempts (using military force) at centralization (1719–1723). In the run-up to the Napoleonic Wars, the relations between the absolutist Spanish Crown and the Basque governing institutions were at breaking point. By the beginning of the War of the Pyrenees, Manuel Godoy took office as Prime Minister in Spain, and went on to take a tough approach on the Basque self-government and specific laws. Both fear and anger spread among the Basques at his uncompromising stance.

=== The end of the fueros in Spain ===
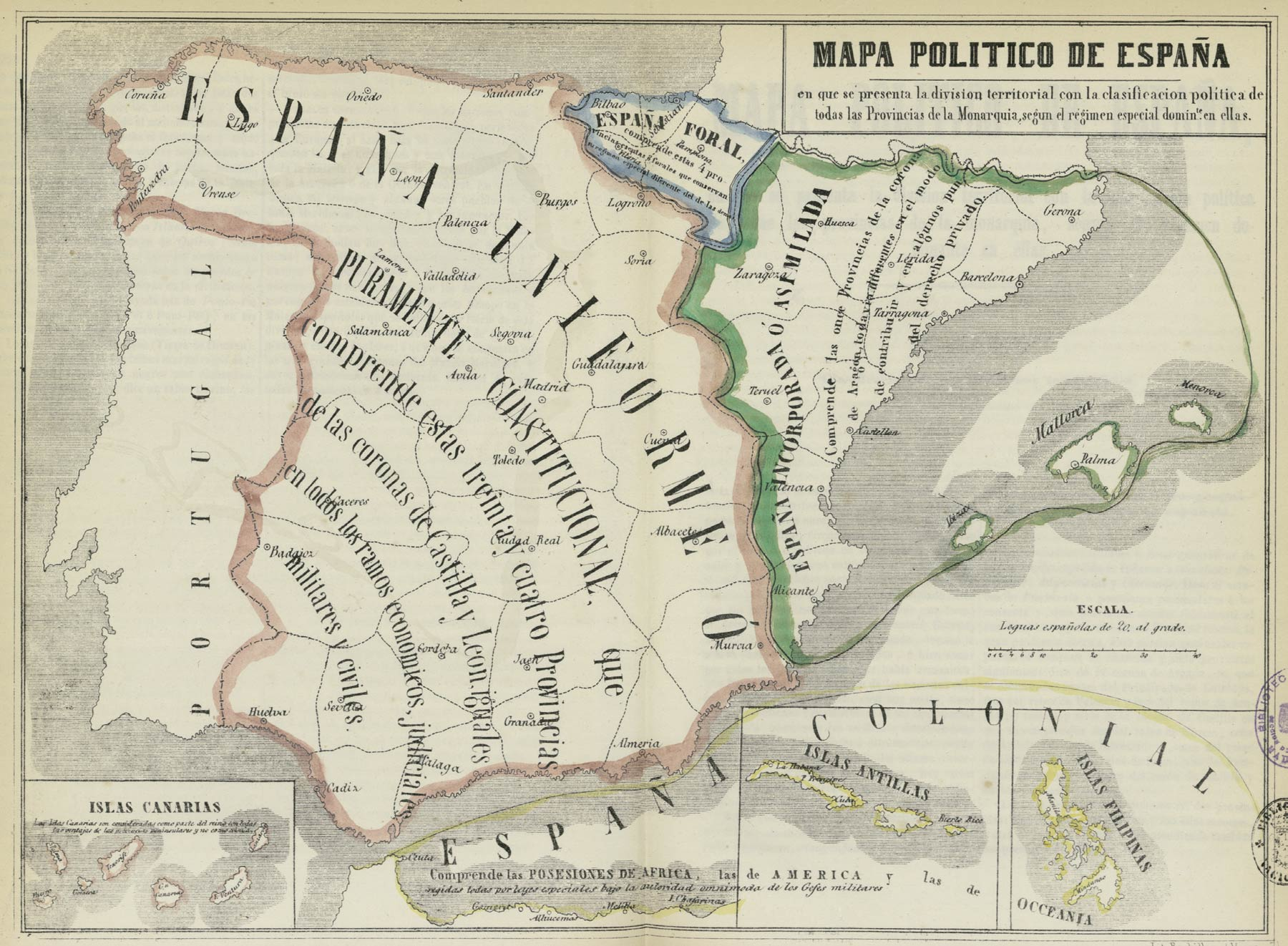
Spain in 1850, with the colors representing the different bailiwicks: the Fully constitutional Spain (brown), most of the former Crown of Castile; Incorporated or assimilated Spain (green), the former Crown of Aragon, including the Catalan-speaking lands; Foral Spain (blue), the Basque-speaking territories; and Colonial Spain (yellow)

The 1789 Revolution brought the rise of the Jacobin nation state—also referred to in a Spanish context as "unitarism", unrelated to the religious view of similar name. Whereas the French Ancien Régime recognized the regional specific laws, the new order did not allow for such autonomy. The jigsaw puzzle of fiefs was divided into départements, based on administrative and ideological concerns, not tradition. In the French Basque Country, what little remained of self-government was suppressed in 1790 during the French Revolution and the new administrative arrangement, and was followed by the interruption of the customary cross-border trade between the Basque districts (holding minor internal customs or duties), the mass deportation to the Landes of thousands of residents in the bordering villages of Labourd—Sara, Itxassou, Ascain—, including the imposition (fleetingly) of alien names to villages and towns—period of the National Convention and War of the Pyrenees (1793–1795).

Some Basques saw a way forward in the 1808 Bayonne Statute and Dominique-Joseph Garat's project, initially approved by Napoleon, to create a separate Basque state, but the French invasive attitude on the ground and the deadlock of the self-government project led the Basques to find help elsewhere, i.e. local liberal or moderate commanders and public figures supportive of the fueros, or the conservative Ferdinand VII. The 1812 Spanish Constitution of Cadiz received no Basque input, ignored the Basque self-government, and was accepted begrudgingly by the Basques, overwhelmed by war events. For example, the 1812 Constitution was signed by Gipuzkoan representatives to a general Castaños wielding menacingly a sword, and tellingly the San Sebastián council representatives took an oath to the 1812 Constitution with the smell of smoke still wafting and surrounded by rubble.

During the two centuries since the French Revolution and the Napoleonic Era, the level of autonomy for the Basque regions within Spain has varied. The cry for fueros (meaning regional autonomy) was one of the demands of the Carlists of the 19th century, hence the strong support for Carlism from the Basque Country and (especially in the First Carlist War) in Catalonia and Aragón. The Carlist effort to restore an absolute monarchy was sustained militarily mainly by those whom the fueros had protected from the full weight of absolutism, due to their readiness to respect region and kingdom specific legal systems and institutions. The defeat of the Carlists in three successive wars resulted in continuing erosion of traditional Basque privileges.

The Carlist land-based small nobility (jauntxos) lost power to the new bourgeoisie, who welcomed the extension of Spanish customs borders from the Ebro to the Pyrenees. The new borders protected the fledgling Basque industry from foreign competition and opened the Spanish market, but lost opportunities abroad since customs were imposed on the Pyrenees and the coast.

=== Echoes of the fueros after suppression in Spain ===
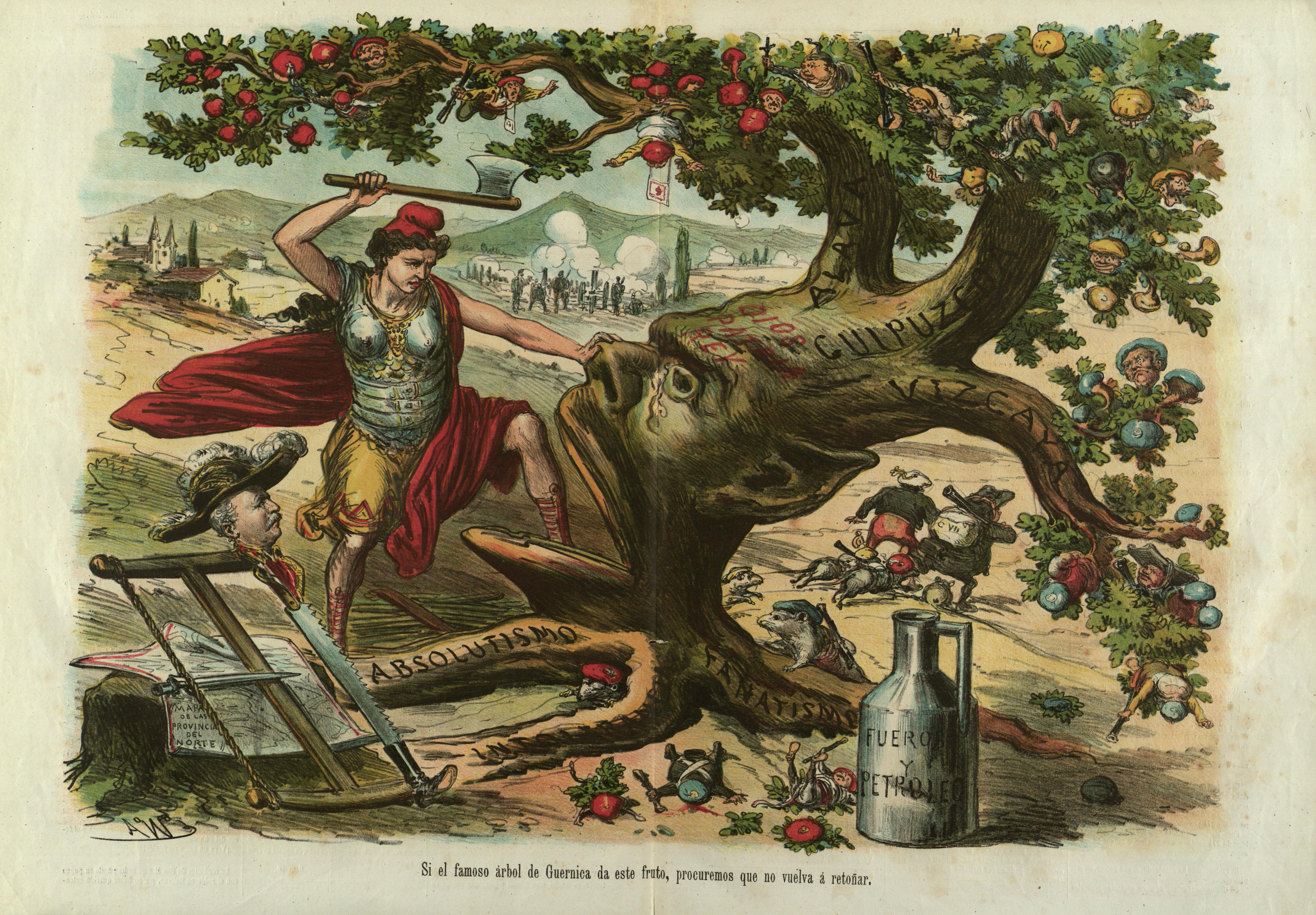
Spanish satiric depiction against the fueros embodied in the Tree of Gernika

After the First Carlist War, the new class of Navarre negotiated separately from the rest of Basque districts the Ley Paccionada (or Compromise Act) in Navarre (1841), which granted some administrative and fiscal prerogatives to the provincial government within Spain. The rest of the Basque districts managed to keep still for another 40 years a small status of self-government, definitely suppressed in 1876. The end of the Third Carlist War saw the Carlists strong in the Basque districts succumb to the Spanish troops led by King Alfonso XII and their reduced self-government was suppressed and converted into Economic Agreements. Navarre's status was less altered in 1876 than that of Gipuzkoa, Biscay, and Álava, due to the separate agreement signed in 1841 by officials of the Government of Navarre with the Spanish government accepting the transformation of the kingdom into a Spanish province.

Despite capitulation agreements acknowledging specific administrative and economic prerogatives, attempts of the Spanish government to bypass them spread malaise and anger in the Basque districts, ultimately leading to the 1893–94 Gamazada uprising in Navarre. Sabino Arana bore witness to the popular revolt as a Biscayne envoy to the protests.

The enthusiasm raised by the popular revolt in Navarre against the breach of war ending agreements made a deep impact on Sabino Arana, who went on to found the Basque Nationalist Party in 1895, based in Biscay but aiming beyond the boundaries of each Basque district, seeking instead a confederation of the Basque districts. Arana, of a Carlist background, rejected the Spanish monarchy and founded Basque nationalism on the basis of Catholicism and fueros (Lagi-Zaŕa, as he called them in Basque, "Old Law"). The competitive, Carlist vision of fueros was laid out in 1915 by Eustaquio Echave-Sustaeta and in 1921 by Teodoro de Arana y Beláustegui.

The high-water mark of a restoration of Basque autonomy in recent times came under the Second Spanish Republic in the mid twentieth century. An attempt was made at restoring some kind of Basque self-government in the Statute of Estella, initially garnering a majority of the votes, but controversially failing to take off (Pamplona, 1932). Four years later and amid a climate of war, Basque nationalists supported the left-leaning Republic as ardently as they had earlier supported the right-wing Carlists (note that contemporary Carlists supported Francisco Franco). The defeat of the Republic by the forces of Francisco Franco led in turn to a suppression of Basque culture, including banning the public use of the Basque language.

The Franco regime considered Biscay and Gipuzkoa as "traitor provinces" and cancelled their fueros. However, the pro-Franco provinces of Álava and Navarre maintained a degree of autonomy unknown in the rest of Spain, with local telephone companies, provincial limited-bailiwick police forces (miñones in Alava, and Foral Police in Navarre), road works and some taxes to support local government.

The post-Franco Spanish Constitution of 1978 acknowledged "historical rights" and attempted to compromise in the old conflict between centralism and federalism by establishing a constitutional provision catering to historic Catalan and Basque political demands, and leaving open the possibility of establishing their own autonomous communities. The Spanish Constitution speaks of "nationalities" and "historic territories", but does not define them. The term nationality itself was coined for the purpose, and neither Basques nor Catalans are specifically recognized by the Constitution.

After the 1981 coup d'état attempt and the ensuing passing of the restrictive LOAPA act, such possibility of autonomy got opened to whatever (reshaped) Spanish region demanded it (such as Castile and León, Valencia, etc.), even to those never struggling to have their separate identity recognized and always considering themselves invariably Spanish. The State of Autonomous Communities took the shape of administrative districts and was ambiguous as to the actual recognition of separate identities, coming to be known as café para todos, or 'coffee for everyone'.

However, the provincial chartered governments (Diputación Foral / Foru Aldundia) in the Basque districts were restored, getting back significant powers. Other powers held historically by the chartered governments ("Diputación") were transferred to the new government of the Basque Country autonomous community. The Basque provinces still perform tax collection in their respective territories, coordinating with the Basque/Navarrese, Spanish, as well as European governments.

Today, the act regulating the powers of the government of Navarre is the Amejoramiento del Fuero ("Betterment of the Fuero"), and the official name of Navarre is Comunidad Foral de Navarra, foral ('chartered') being the adjectival form for fuero. The conservative governmental party in Navarre UPN (2013) claimed during its establishment (1979) and at later times the validity and continuity of the institutional framework for Navarre held during Franco's dictatorship (1936–1975), considering the present regional status quo an "improvement" of its previous status.

== Private law ==
Map of Spain depicting the autonomous communities which retained its own private law (in green): Aragon, Balearics, Basque Country, Catalonia, Galicia, and Navarre

While fueros have disappeared from administrative law in Spain, (except for the Basque Country and Navarre), there are remnants of the old laws in family law. When the Civil Code was established in Spain (1888) some parts of it did not run in some regions. In places like Galicia and Catalonia, the marriage contracts and inheritance are still governed by local laws. This has led to peculiar forms of land distribution.

These laws are not uniform. For example, in Biscay, different rules regulate inheritance in the villas, than in the country towns (tierra llana). Modern jurists try to modernize the foral family laws while keeping with their spirit.

== Fueros in Spanish America ==
During the colonial era in Spanish America, the Spanish Empire extended fueros to the clergy, the fuero eclesiástico. The crown attempted to curtail the fuero eclesiástico, which gave the lower secular (diocesan) clergy privileges that separated them legally from their plebeian parishioners. The curtailment of the fuero has been seen as a reason why so many clerics participated in the Mexican War of Independence, including insurgency leaders Miguel Hidalgo and José María Morelos. Removal of the fuero was seen by the Church as another act of the Bourbon Reforms that alienated the Mexican population, including American-born Spaniards.

In the eighteenth century, when Spain established a standing military in key areas of its overseas territory, privileges were extended to the military, the fuero militar, which had an impact on the colonial legal system and society. The fuero militar was the first time that privileges extended to plebeians, which has been argued was a cause of debasing justice. Indigenous men were excluded from the military, and inter-ethnic conflicts occurred. The fuero militar presented some contradictions in colonial rule.

In post-independence Mexico, formerly New Spain, fueros continued to be recognized by the Mexican state until the mid-nineteenth century. As Mexican liberals gained power, they sought to implement the liberal ideal of equality before the law by eliminating special privileges of the clerics and the military. The Liberal Reform and the liberal Constitution of 1857's abolition of those fueros mobilized Mexico's conservatives, which fought a civil war, and rallied allies to their cause with the slogan religión y fueros ("religion and privileges").

For post-independence Chile, the fuero militar also was an issue concerning the rights and privileges of citizenship.

== List of fueros ==
- Fueros of Navarre
- Fors de Bearn
- Constitutions of Catalonia
- Furs de Valencia
- Fuero de Oreja
