= Fueros of Navarre =

Laws of the Kingdom of Navarre up to 1841

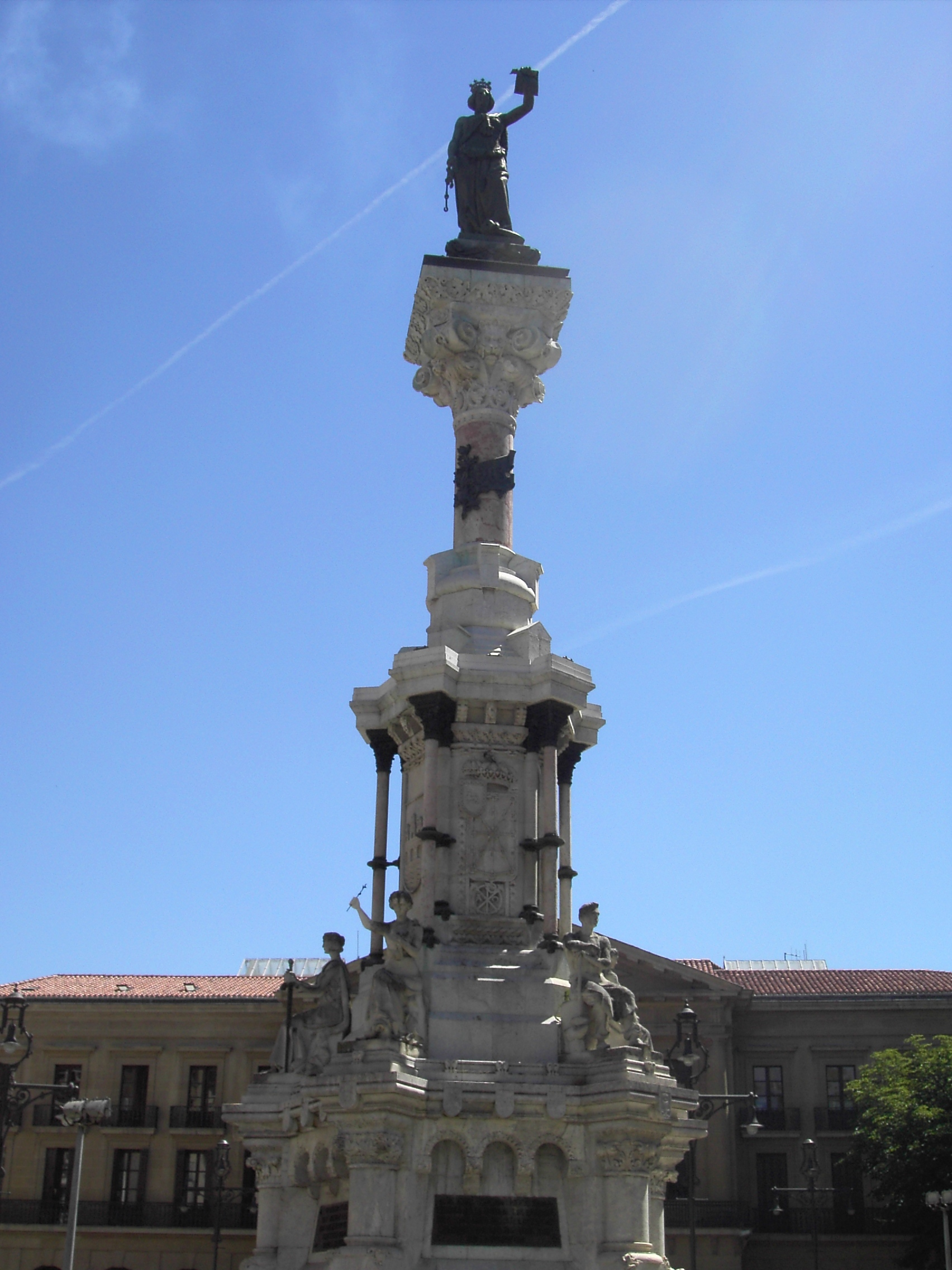
Memorial erected in Pamplona to the fueros (1903)

The Fueros of Navarre (Spanish: Fuero General de Navarra, Basque: Nafarroako Foru Orokorra, meaning in English General Charter of Navarre) were the laws of the Kingdom of Navarre up to 1841, tracing its origins to the Early Middle Ages and issued from Basque consuetudinary law prevalent across the (western) Pyrenees. They were a sort of constitution which regulated the social order and defined the position of the king, the nobility, and the judicial procedures, which meant that the royal decisions needed to conform to the provisions set out by the charters.

The first such written document goes back to 1238. The next codifications are attested by modifications or amendments (amejoramientos) dated to 1330 and 1419. After 1512, Navarre was divided into two, with Upper Navarre a part of the nascent Kingdom of Spain and Lower Navarre an independent kingdom (incorporated into France in 1620).

== Upper Navarre ==
From 1515 until 1841, Upper Navarre was in effect an autonomous kingdom in personal union with the Spanish crown. It was allowed to retain a large degree of home rule, preserving much of the institutions of the independent kingdom, not exempt of tensions with the ever centralizing drive of Castile and attempts at reunification with independent Navarre to the north of the Pyrenees led by the Parliament. In 1528, the Cortes of Navarre sitting at Pamplona authorised a simplified law code known as the Fuero Reducido. Although widely used, it was never confirmed by the king.

A viceroy represented the Spanish monarch. The Cortes (the Parliament) was the main legislative body, composed of three estates of clergy, nobles and burgesses. There was a Royal Council and a Supreme Court, as well as a Diputación del Reyno or Government of Navarre (similar to the Generalitat of Aragon and the Generalitats of Catalonia and Valencia).

== Lower Navarre ==
An Occitan translation of the Navarrese fueros was made under the title Los Fors et Costumas deu Royaume de Navarre deça-ports. It was approved by Henry III in 1608, then confirmed by Louis II in 1611 before Navarre was integrated into France in 1620. It was re-confirmed by Louis in 1622. It was not printed until 1644 and its last printing was in 1722. It was in effect until the French Revolution. A modern edition was published in 1968.

== See also ==
- Basque fueros during the Modern Period
- English Magna Carta
