= End of Basque home rule in Spain =

Final period of the Basque self-government within the Crown of Castile and Spain

The end of Basque home rule or fueros in Spain was a process coming to a head in the period extending from the First Carlist War (1833–1840) to the aftermath of the Third Carlist War (1876–1878). It brought to an end the status of sovereignty coupled with allegiance to the Crown of Castile held by the different Basque territories for centuries. In the French Basque Country, home rule was abruptly suppressed during the French Revolution (starting 1790).

The loss of home rule (fueros) was followed by the Basque Economic Agreement (1878), a period of shaky peace with occasional popular uprisings, like the Gamazada centred in Navarre, and the emergence of Basque nationalism.

== Background ==
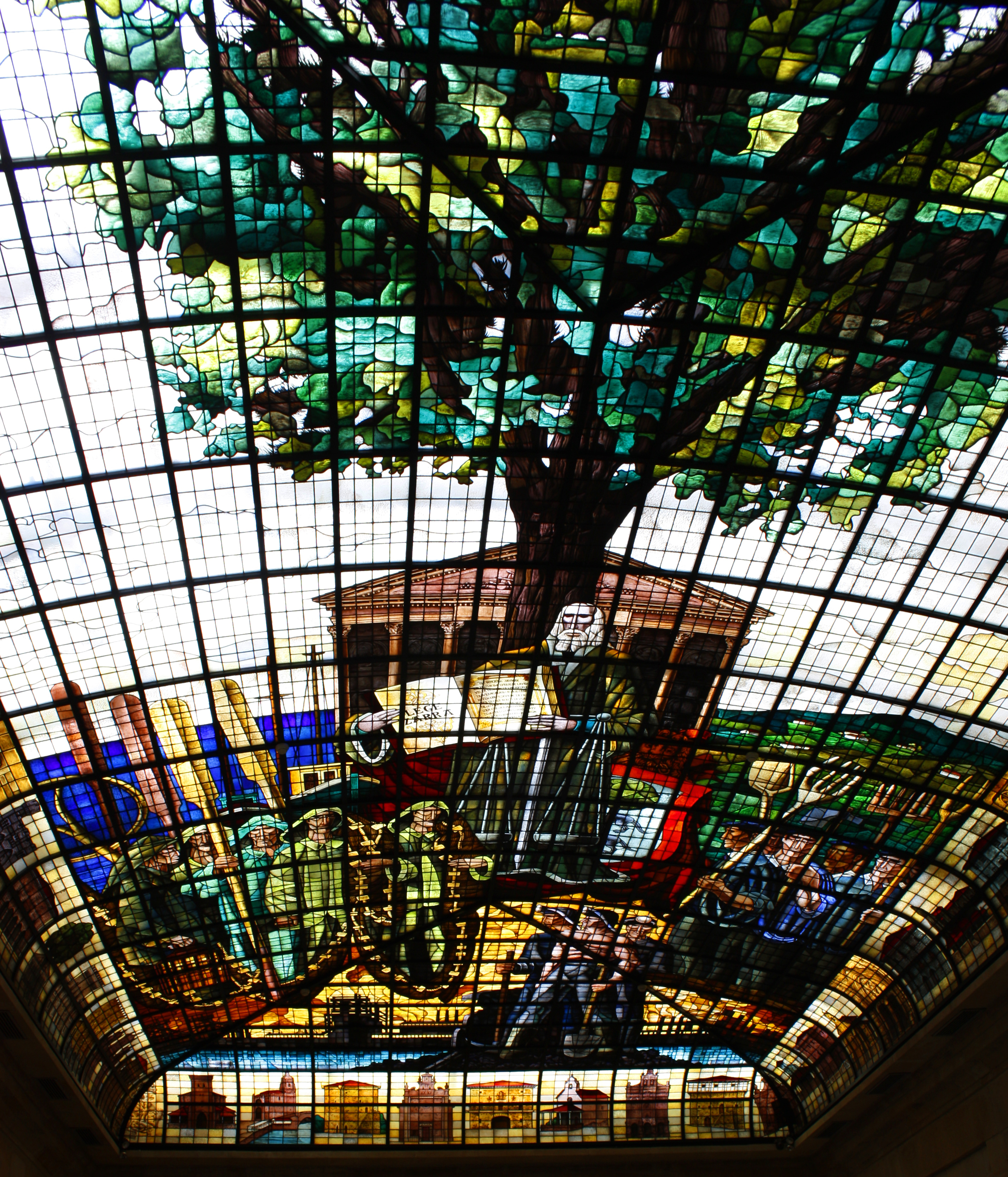
Stained glass ceiling inside Gernika'a Assembly House (erected 1828), depicting the Tree of Gernika

After the restoration of Basque institutions and laws with the comeback of King Ferdinand VII (1814), Spanish centralization did not cease. In 1829, the jurisdictional parliament of the kingdom (Cortes) reunited in Navarre, for the last time. In 1833, the accession of the liberals to the government saw the one-sided administrative homogenization of Spain by the new government in Madrid, as well as the outbreak of the First Carlist War. In 1837, the new liberal Constitution of Spain was passed, with the new Spanish legal text conspicuously overriding the Basque legal and institutional reality.

== Basque home rule altered ==
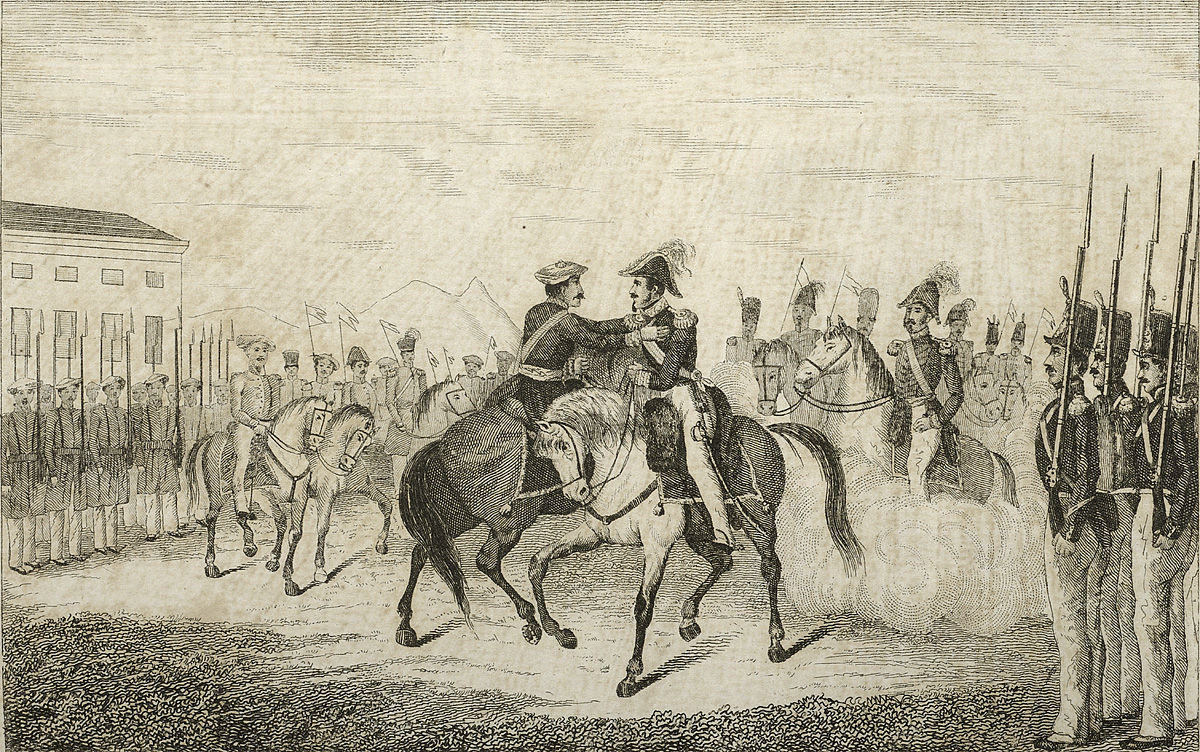
Embrace of Bergara putting a term to the First Carlist War in the Basque Country

The Embrace of Bergara showed an intricate wording, whereby General Baldomero Espartero would strongly recommend the Spanish government to respect Basque laws and institutions, allowing ample leeway for further interpretation on its elaboration. The central government in Madrid was controlled by a liberal majority, who opposed Basque home rule, in turn pushing an additional phrase to its ratification, "with due regard to the constitutional unity of the Monarchy" (October 1839). It involved a modification of the agreement reached in Bergara months earlier.

According to the Minister of Grace and Justice Lorenzo de Arrazola the phrase meant "unity in all the big bonds", but would involve for instance the establishment of a Spanish governmental deputy in each district, as well as leaving lesser matters to the different Basque institutions. The wording was regarded by the pro-fueros personalities as being at odds with the authority of the Basque Country's own constitutional foundations, an oxymoron.

== Between wars ==
=== Navarre's Ley Paccionada ===
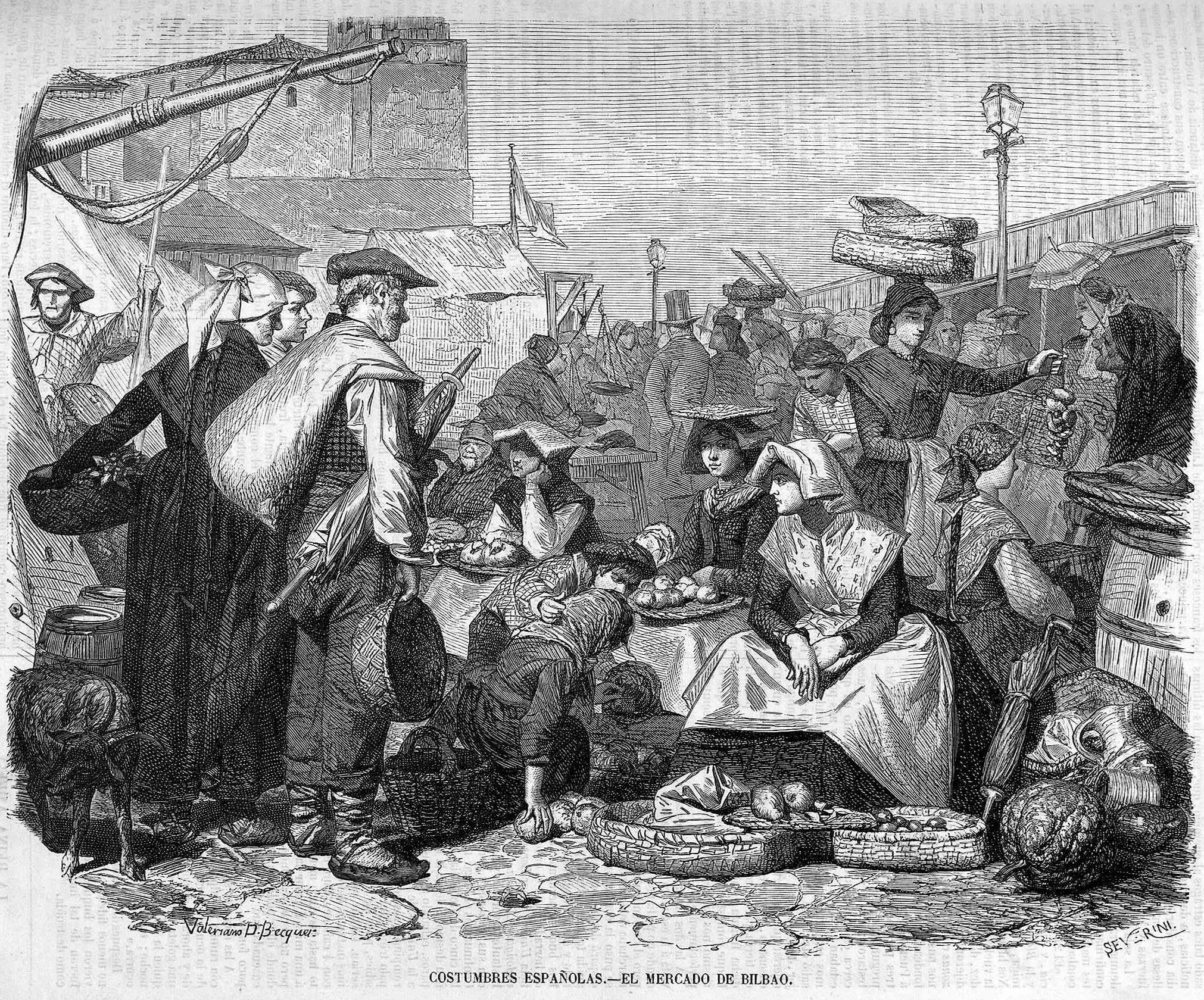
Market day in Bilbao (1866)

In February 1840, Biscay, Gipuzkoa, and Álava refused to accept any modifications of their self-government. By contrast, high-ranking officials of Navarre's Provincial (not the traditional Chartered) Council appointed a task-force submitted to Madrid with a negotiation mandate based on the October 1839 Act. Many in Navarre opposed negotiating their self-government, but others, like Yanguas y Miranda, pointed to the archaism of the Fuero General, Navarre's main constitutional document. Yanguas y Miranda's position was supported by San Sebastián's city council, spearheaded by Tomas de Zumalacarregui's brother Miguel Antonio. The panel put together a list of six points subject to discussion.

However, the government in Madrid fell back on the military by May 1840, when General Espartero was made regent and associated to the presidency of the government. He teamed up with the Spanish Progressives, and talks with the Navarrese envoys fell way short of the initial expectations in Navarre, the outcome establishing the assimilation of Navarre to a regular Spanish province (August 1841), except for a specificity in the fiscal quota, tax management, and minor administrative prerogatives. Navarre was not a kingdom any more; the new arrangement for Navarre was later called the Ley Paccionada or 'Compromise Act', invoking a 'spirit of compromise'.

=== Abolition during military occupation ===
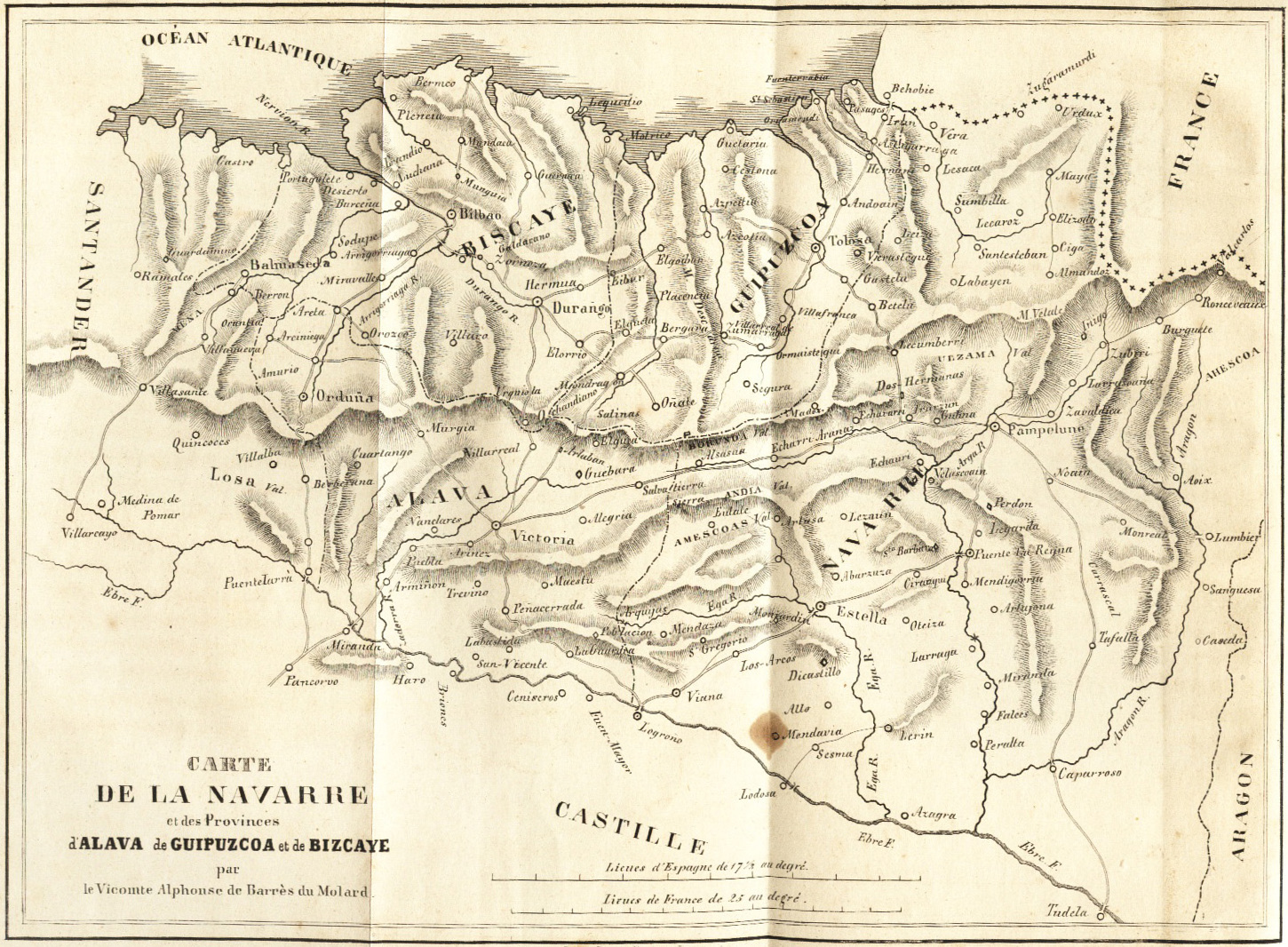
Map of the Basque districts in Spain (circa 1842)

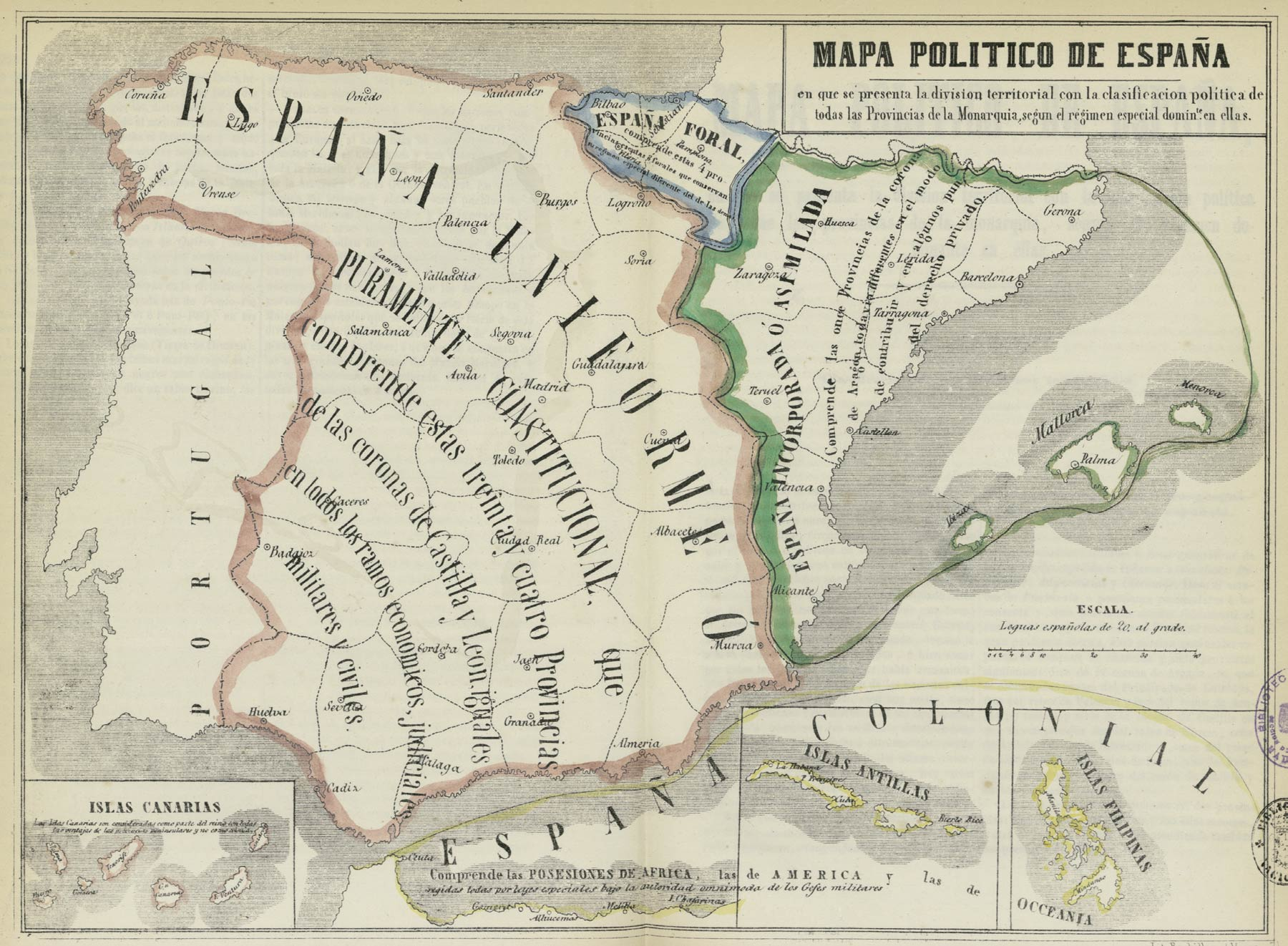
Political and legal jurisdictions of Spain (1850)

The Basque Provinces, who regarded with astonishment the political developments affecting Navarre, quit talks with Madrid. In the wake of the August 1841 Act for Navarre, tension mounted, and the upfront defense of home rule by the Basque regional councils was responded by Espartero's central government sending troops over to the Basque Country. It was followed by the Abolition Decree promulgated in a Vitoria-Gasteiz occupied by the Spanish governmental army (October 1841). The decree brought customs over to the Pyrenees and the coast permanently, and San Sebastián and Pasaia were declared ports for foreign trade.

In January 1842 further curtailments were made totally levelling administration, justice, and government with the Spanish provinces. The 1839 Act and the war ending agreement thus lost all its worth. The (Chartered) General Councils in each district engaged in passive resistance, hanging onto their own institutions, treasury, and regional specificity for the military draft, no service in the Spanish military.

=== Neoforal period ===
The 1841 stand-off came to an end on arrival to the Spanish government of Ramón María Narváez and his moderate Conservatives, who decreed a legal arrangement acknowledging a limited but relevant statute reminiscent of full Basque self-government (July 1844). Álava, Gipuzkoa and Biscay inaugurated a temporary status of difficult balance, "a peculiar neoforal period", as it has been labelled. During the following nearly 30 years, the authorities of the Basque Provinces avoided a demand for full reintegration of sovereignty, instead clinging to a shaky peace based on ad hoc bargaining with the Spanish government with respect to fiscal contribution and military draft, e.g. African war campaign, 1859–1860.

== Indefinite loss of home rule after war ==
=== Carlist outbreak centred in the Basque Country ===
In 1872, war erupted in the Basque districts amidst instability in Spain. The initial outbreak was diffused after an agreement was reached in the 1872 Convention of Amorebieta between Biscayan general council representatives and the Spanish General Francisco Serrano, but they were disenfranchised in their respective parties, with military confrontation resuming thereafter.

"The Basque Provinces and Navarre share the same history and tradition, personality and landscape, customs and believes, feelings and interests. Their territories show one and the same appearance. The Basque language, their original and main language treasured by them since always, will be kept for ever in this country as a glorious blazon for the Basque-language people [pueblo euscaro]."
Provincial Council of Navarre, 18 August 1866

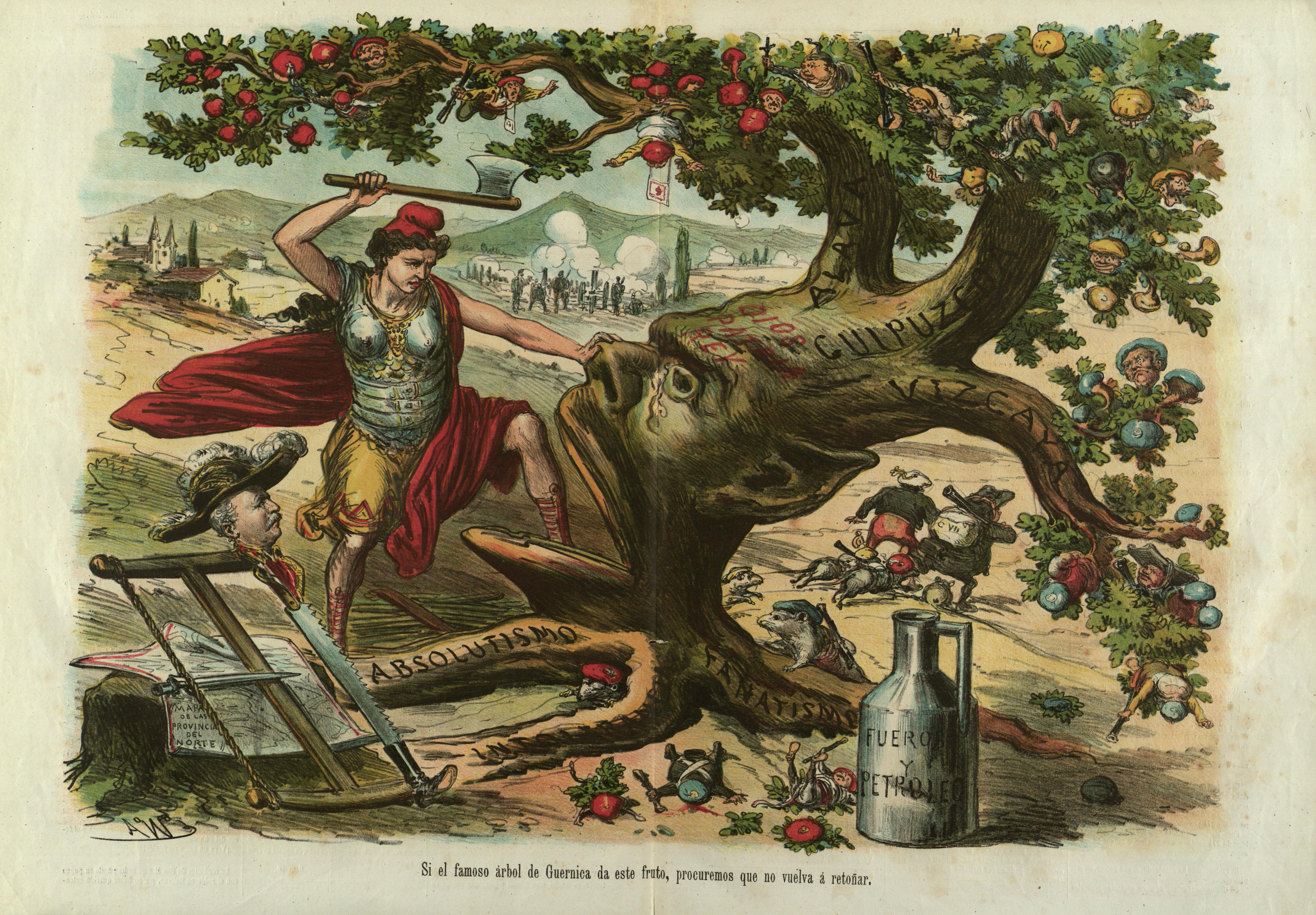
Spanish satiric propaganda against the Tree of Gernika and the fueros

Claimant to the throne Carlos refused initially to pledge an oath to the fueros in Gernika, but did so in 1874 out of concern for the loyalty of the Basques. The Carlist forces remained strong across rural areas, but were unable to take over the capital cities of the provinces, home to the main Spanish military strongholds, as well as the liberal bourgeoisie. The latter showed an assorted range of interests, but were overall supportive of the fueros. In spring 1875, the Alfonsinos attempted a compromise with the Carlists, whereby they acknowledged the separate Basque legal and institutional system, but Carlist officials rejected it.

After Carlist defeat in Catalonia in the summer of 1875, Alfonso XII's Spanish governmental forces advanced to the north over the Basque Country, taking control of all Carlist areas by February 1876. Out of the huge army occupying Pamplona, 40,000 went on to station in the Basque Provinces, where martial law was imposed. The Carlist defeat would prompt the end of the secular confederate Basque self-government.

=== Stand-off with talks ===
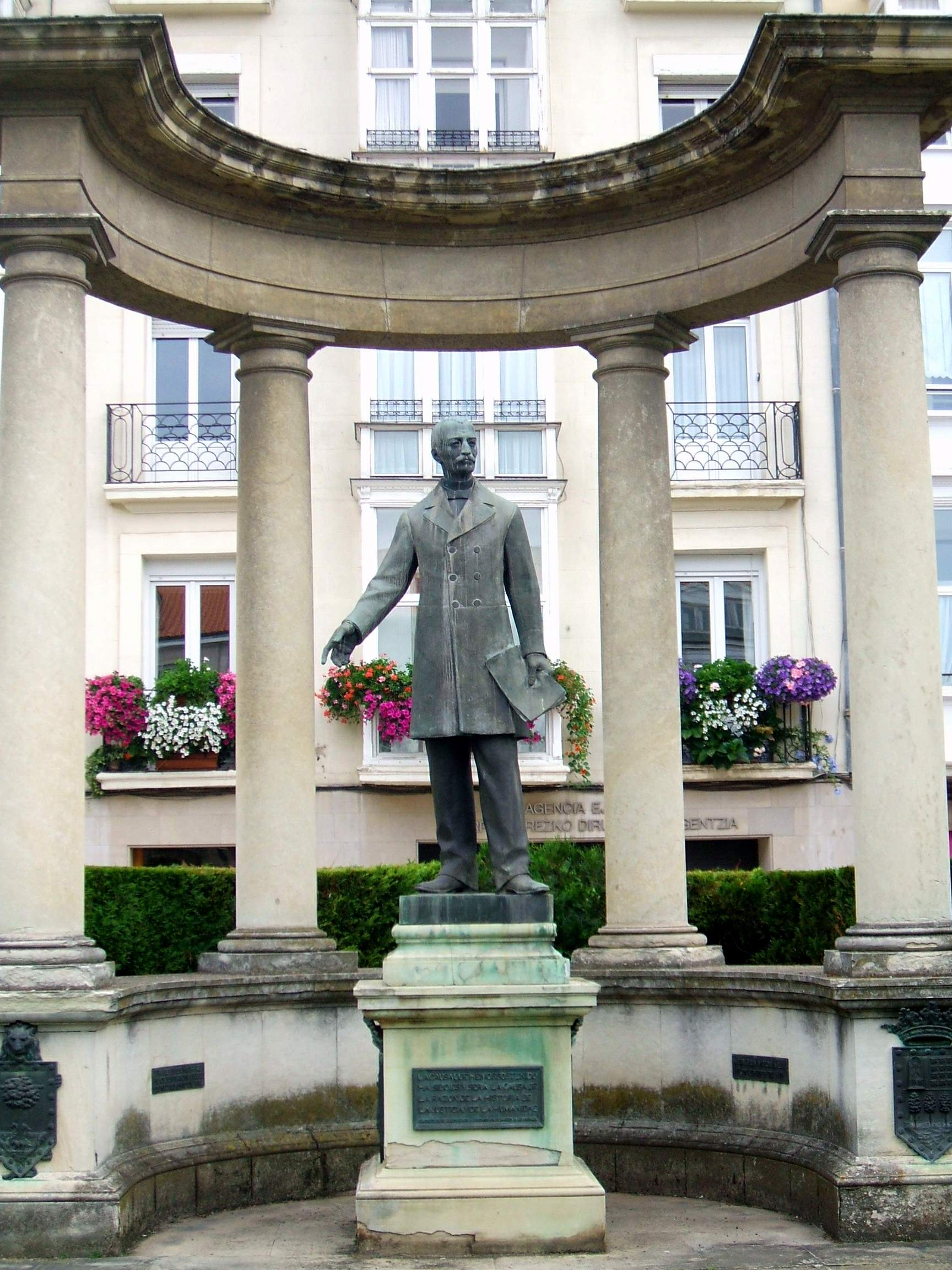
Memorial to Álavan MP Mateo de Moraza, ardent defender of the fueros

However, pragmatic considerations left the Spanish premier and new strongman Canovas del Castillo with no option but talks with the Basque Provinces (May 1876). This took the form of close-doors negotiations with high-ranking officials of the regional chartered councils, so by-passing the representative assemblies, or Juntas Generales. Since the chartered councils had remained in the capital cities during war, these officials were Liberals, still favouring the preservation of the "7-centuries long" home rule. By contrast, the Spanish premier, unlike Baldomero Espartero decades earlier, stated that the fueros were nothing but "privileges granted by the Spanish monarchs."

After a number of heated debates and close-doors meetings, no agreement was reached, and the 21 July 1876 Law abolished Basque home rule amidst a strong, bitter climate against the Basque separate status in Spain. Frustrated, the Basque MPs in Madrid, all of them Liberals, abandoned their seats in clamorous silence.

The law pushed by prime minister Antonio Canovas del Castillo abolished the Basque institutional system of Biscay, Álava, and Gipuzkoa, virtually assimilating it to the status held by Navarre (established in 1841). As stated by the prime minister, the Abolition Act was "a punishment law," and guaranteed "the expansion of the Spanish constitutional union to all Spain," according to the centralist Constitution proclaimed in 1876. A unitarian and central administration was established in Spain cut out according to a Spanish-Castilian pattern. Still the law designed by Canovas del Castillo left margin enough to allow for further manoeuvring in its implementation. The first article of the July 21, 1876 law proclaimed:

The duties the political Constitution has always imposed upon all the Spanish to do the military service when they are called by law, and contribute in proportion of their assets to the state expenditures, hereby expand to the inhabitants of the provinces of Biscay, Gipuzkoa and Álava, just as others of the Nation.

Hoping the 1841 Ley Paccionada that officially turned the semi-autonomous Kingdom of Navarre into another province of Spain would shelter them from the central government's tampering, the Navarrese initially steered clear of the clash between Madrid and the Basque general councils. However, they would soon discover the Spanish government held also a plan for Navarre.

As of 1876, the Basques would be required to enrol in the Spanish military on an individual basis, and not in separate groups or corps, despite the fact that many Basques could hardly articulate a few phrases in Spanish, exposing them at best to stressful experiences.

=== Basque Economic Agreement ===
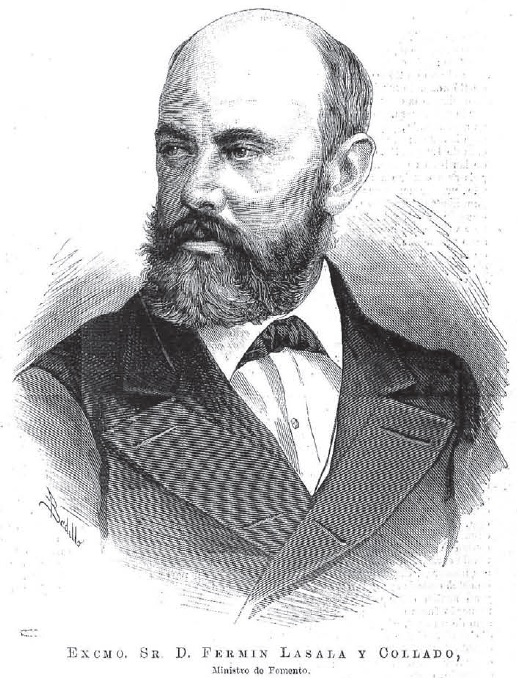
Fermin Lasala, wealthy San Sebastián resident and prominent figure during Canovas del Castillo's office in a critical period

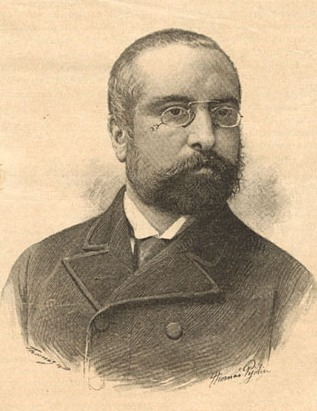
Arturo Campion, outspoken advocate of the fueros and founder of the Sociedad Euskara

When the Basque self-government was abolished, a number of sticking points remained to be addressed, such as tax collection or military service. The Basque Liberal elite based in the capital cities, hung onto home rule and the pre-war political status. In the midst of military occupation lasting up to 1878, freedom of expression was suppressed, especially targeting any demands in favour of the fueros. In view of the emergency state in the Basque districts, Basque political figures opted to bring their case over to Madrid by launching a newspaper, La Paz. It featured the collaboration of new and veteran home rule advocates from all four Basque districts.

On the other hand, the Spanish premier focused in phasing out all traces of home rule. However, Canovas was a pragmatic; other than military strongholds, customs officials, and courts in the capital cities, the Spanish governmental infrastructure was virtually non-existent in the Basque Provinces. In addition, their knowledge of Basque territory was negligible.

Navarre appeared to remain unscathed by the political tensions in Álava, Biscay, and Gipuzkoa, but in early 1877, Canovas del Castillo, who initially meant to hold talks with all four Basque districts, made the most of Navarre's separate position to suppress also their 'Compromise Act', arguing that it was but a regular (parliamentary) act. The fiscal quota remained unaltered since 1841, so he decided to change that and totally level Navarre with a regular Spanish province in the national budget.

During the preliminary parliamentary debates, the dividing gulf between the government and the Basque-Navarrese became apparent; Canovas del Castillo was adamant that the war ending 1839 and 1841 laws were nothing near of a treaty. "A matter of force comes to constitute Law, since force is Law when force generates a status", he went, attempting to justify his position. The governmental law was eventually passed by the Spanish parliament, supported by 123 votes, while 11 opposed it: four of the seven Navarrese MPs, and the rest of the Basques (seven). A situation of instability followed, in view of which the central government decided to submit Count Tejada de Valdosera, a jurist, to Navarre with a view to reaching a new agreement that eventually led to the "Tejada-Valdosera Convention". The compromise established guarantees for Navarre's separate administrative arrangement within Spain. No Navarrese MP in Madrid opposed the legal arrangement, which gave way to speculations and the Navarrese MPs' own bizarre, regretful accounts as to their stance on a law regarded as an imposition on both Navarrese coffers and idiosyncrasy.

In the Basque Provinces, the first call ever to the Spanish military draft was met with frontal opposition of the general councils by November 1877. Tension mounted again between the Basque general (chartered) councils and the Spanish government. Canovas demanded the immediate execution of the order. Provincial councils were then appointed by the Spanish government, all of them answerable to the Spanish governmental deputy in each district (the gobernador civil). In Biscay, the most upfront district to reject the abolition of the fueros, Canovas ordered an immediate dissolution of the general councils (diputaciones generales). Álava and Gipuzkoa followed suit.

However, the climate of tension generated persuaded the Spanish premier that some kind of compromise with the three Basque councils was the only solution to prevent further unrest, and guarantee long-run stability. Negotiations of the Canovas government with Liberal chief officials of the three Basque Provinces eventually led to the 1st Basque Economic Agreement on 28 February 1878, initially a temporary solution extending for 8 years. The compromise brokered by Fermin Lasala found its roots in the Tejada-Valdosera Convention for Navarre. The announcement of the compromise in the official gazette Gaceta de Madrid dwelt on its alleged political and economic benefits: 1. Expansion of the constitutional order to all Spain. 2. Incorporation of the Basque Provinces to the military draft 3. Contribution to the Spanish treasury as all the rest in Spain.

The newly established provincial councils were thus responsible for the tax collection in the province, and then a negotiation was established for the global contribution to the central government. By means of this pact, the Spanish government theoretically managed to diffuse any lingering regionalist sentiment, besides creating a solid basis for both industrial development, and political and administrative consolidation of the centralized government.

== Aftermath ==
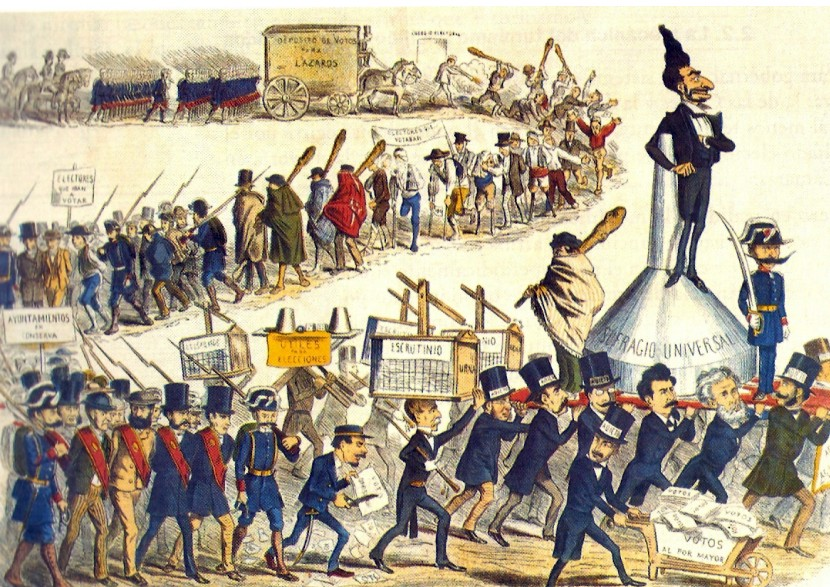
Satiric depiction of the Spanish regime inaugurated in 1876; rise of turnismo and cacique political culture

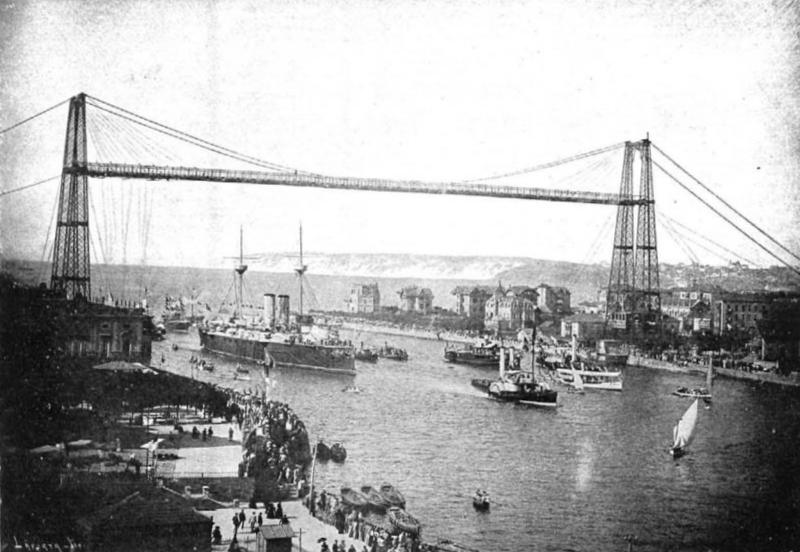
Biscay Bridge in Portugalete, a beacon of Biscay's rapid industrial development (1893)

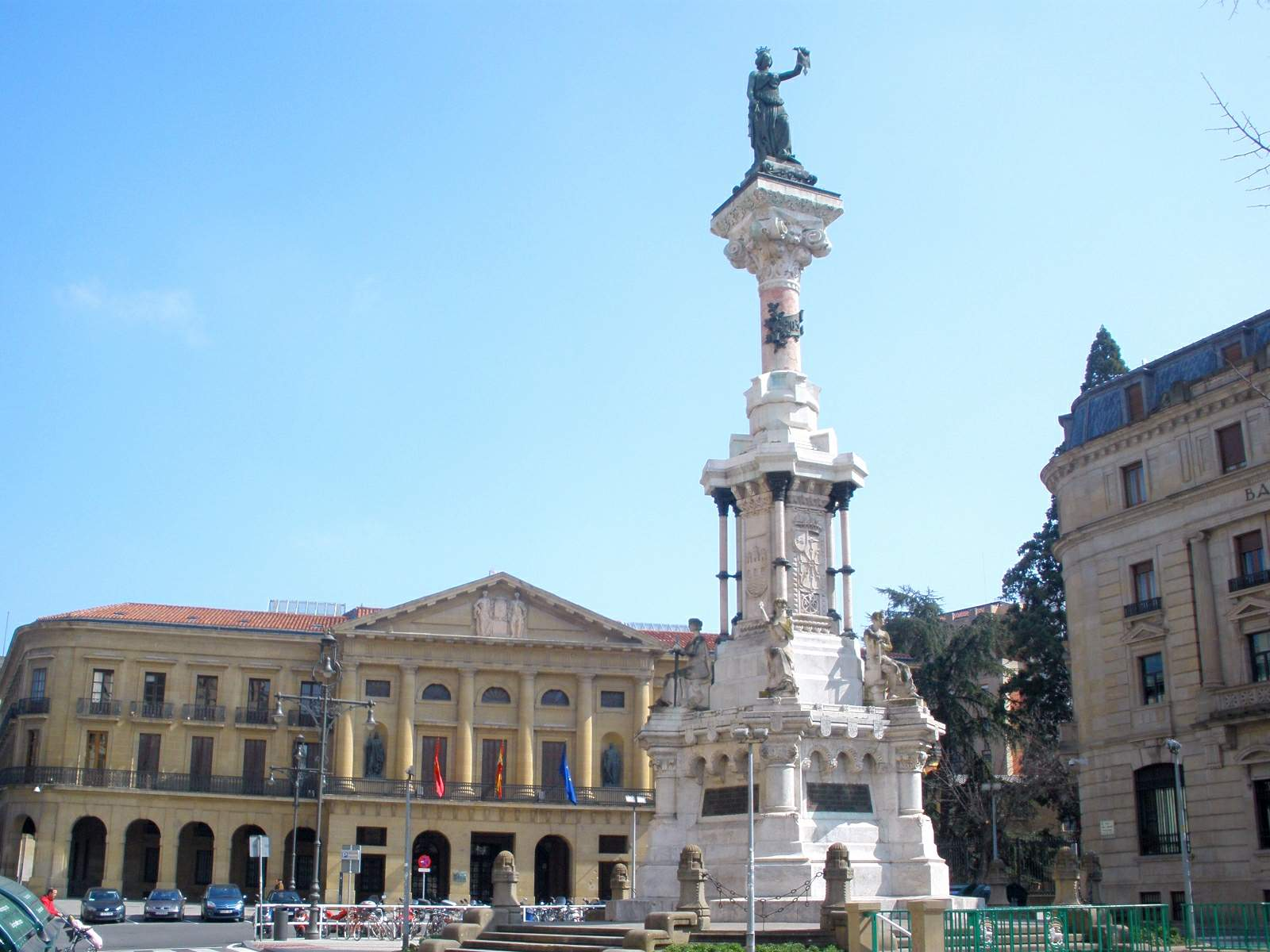
The fueros memorial in Pamplona, erected by popular subscription (1902)

The Basque economic interests now came under the shelter of the state's tariff protection, benefiting from a Spanish captive market. The Spanish governmental plan was to establish the Basque Economic Agreement just on a temporary basis. However, it proved to be a success in terms of industrial development, investment, and revenue. The main beneficiaries, the government and the local urban bourgeoisie, showed an immediate interest in renewing the Economic Agreement formula still for another 8 years, and on. The initial convergence of the Basques around the defence of the fueros from 1876 to 1878 failed to gain momentum once the worst of the political crisis was over, with electoral Carlism incorporating much of their demands.

Spurred by the new favourable economic and administrative design, Biscay steadily thrived to spectacular results; Greater Bilbao became a referential focus of economic development in the European context. The split of interests among the Basques soon became apparent, which in turn diffused the plural pro-fueros movement, contributing to the integration of the industrialist upper classes into Spain. In Navarre, the success of the political movement advocating for the full restoration of the fueros lasted somewhat longer, spearheaded by the lawyer Arturo Campion, but their political demands were then subsumed within the rising electoral Carlism since 1886. A group of political and cultural personalities concerned with the loss of sovereignty and the rapid recession of the Basque signs of identity in Navarre founded the Asociación Euskara of Navarre, still avoiding a fully-fledged political agenda and centering on cultural events and initiatives, e.g. a participation in the Lore Jokoak (first edition in 1852).

In stark contrast to their coastal counterparts, Álava and Navarre went through a gradual economic stagnation, remaining tied to the land with a population made-up of peasants, small farmers, rural notables, and wealthy landowners. Navarre ceased to be the most populous district, Álava also dwindled, with the demographic growth shifting to Biscay and Gipuzkoa. The emigration trend to the Americas started decades earlier did not cease, with an estimation of about 200,000 deciding to depart out of a population of 800,000 during the 19th century.

The cheap labour demanded for mining and the industrial scheme attracted thousands of immigrants, first from the Basque areas in the vicinity and later from other parts of Spain, the first such massive influx of people to the Basque Country. It in turn spawned the establishment of trade unions since 1879, especially Socialists, aiming at the defence of labour interests. The newcomers had little reason to associate themselves to their adopted homeland and their Basque employers, with the new Socialist movement embracing Spanish nationalism as a means of uniting the masses. They advocated for the elimination of Basque-specific features inasmuch as they considered them 'contrary to mass struggle'.

The law known as Tejada-Valdosera Convention did not leave everything settled for Navarre (see above). The disquieting approval of the law paved the way to the design of new fiscal demands to Navarre by the Spanish treasury. Eventually that job came in the hands of the minister Gabriel Gamazo. The attempt to totally level Navarre with Spain was met with a popular and institutional uprising known as the Gamazada (1893–1894), and the ensuing foundation of modern Basque nationalism by Sabino Arana, centered in Biscay.

== See also ==
- History of the Basques
- Carlism
- Nation state
- Restoration (Spain)

== Sources ==
- Elorza, Antonio (April 1978). "De los Fueros a la Dictadura" (PDF). Historia. 16 (Extra 5): 84–101. ISSN 0210-6353.
- Esparza Zabalegi, Jose Mari (2012). Euskal Herria Kartografian eta Testigantza Historikoetan. Euskal Editorea SL. ISBN 978-84-936037-9-3.
- Hobsbawm, E.J. (1992). Nations and Nationalism since 1780. Cambridge University Press. ISBN 0-521-43961-2.
- Mina, María Cruz (1990). "Historia y Política: Las Vicisitudes de una Ley". In Arriazkuenaga, Joseba; Urquijo Goitia, Jose Ramón (eds.). 150 Años del Convenio de Bergara y la Ley del 25 -X - 1939. Eusko Legebiltzarra/Parlamento Vasco. ISBN 84-87122-14-0.
- Uriarte, Jose Luis (2015). "El Concierto Económico; Una Visión Personal". El Concierto Económico. Publitas.
- Watson, Cameron (2003). Modern Basque History: Eighteenth Century to the Present. University of Nevada, Center for Basque Studies. ISBN 1-877802-16-6.
