= Villalonso =

Coordinates: 41°36′N 5°18′W

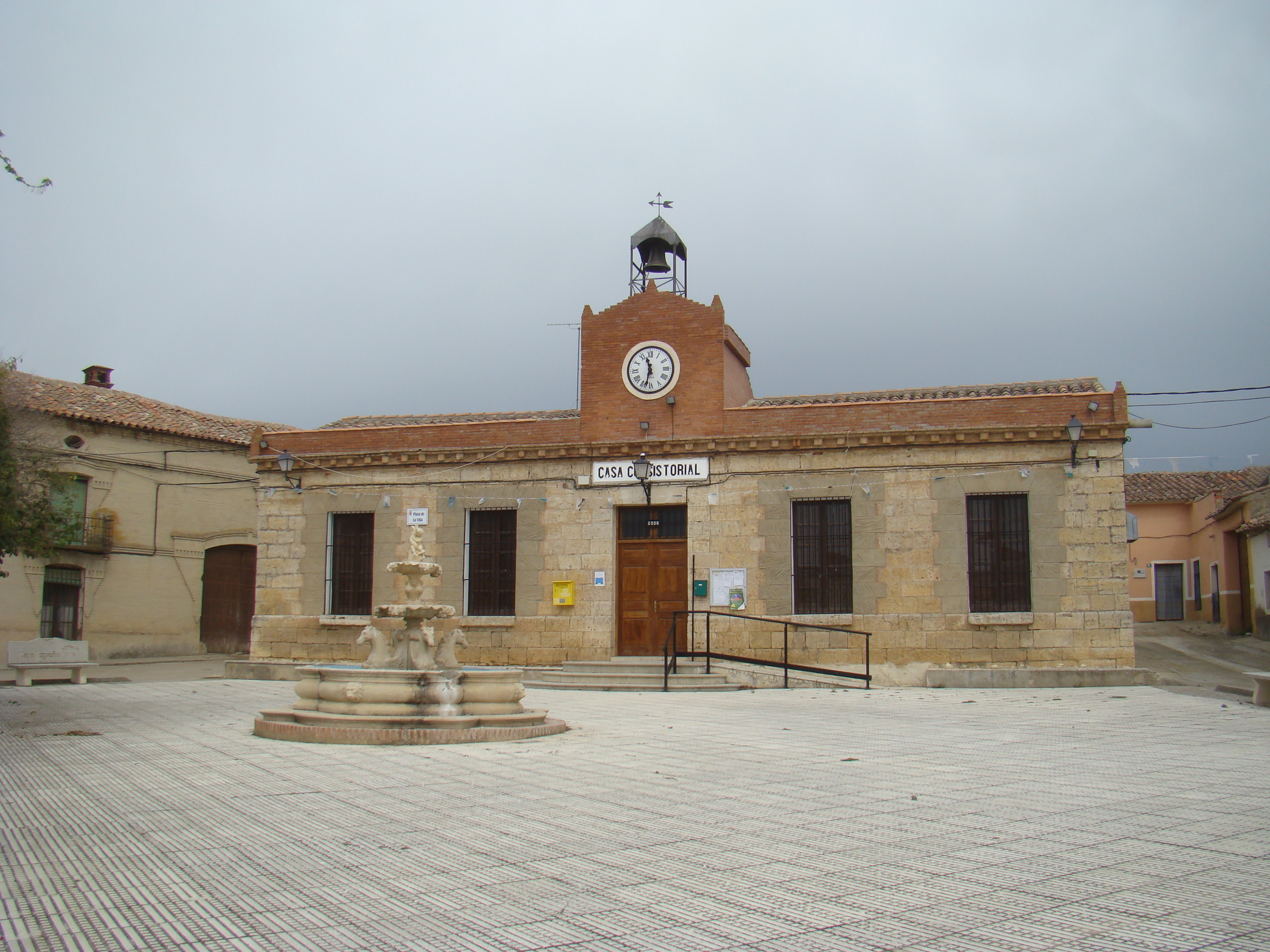
- Interactive map of Villalonso
- Country: Spain
- Autonomous community: Castile and León
- Province: Zamora
- Municipality: Villalonso

Area
  - Total: 14 km^{2} (5.4 sq mi)

Population (2025-01-01)
  - Total: 80
  - Density: 5.7/km^{2} (15/sq mi)
- Time zone: UTC+1 (CET)
  - Summer (DST): UTC+2 (CEST)

Villalonso is a municipality located in the province of Zamora, Castile and León, Spain. According to the 2004 census (INE), the municipality has a population of 116 inhabitants.

In 1147 Osorio Martínez granted a fuero to Villalonso with the approval of Alfonso VII. The village in turn was required to make an annual payment in kind of half a sheep, ten loaves of bread, some barley, and some must. The villa of Villalonso has been the ground of some movies, the most famous is Robin and Marian by Richard Lester, and a great cast of actors such as Sean Connery, Audrey Herpburn, Robert Shaw and Richard Harris.
