= End of Basque home rule in France =

End of Basque native laws and institutions during French Revolution

The end of Basque home rule or foruak/fors, the native institutional and legal system, took place during the French revolutionary period (1789-1795). The final violent dissolution of the semi-autonomous Basque institutional and legal system was coupled with the arrival of French troops to the Basque Country within the War of the Pyrenees and a deliberate terror on the Basque population centred in Labourd.

It resulted in the abrupt suppression of all native governmental and jurisdictional organs and the establishment of the departement of the Lower Pyrenees (Basses-Pyrénées), as well as the departement administrative system, as everywhere in France.

== Background ==
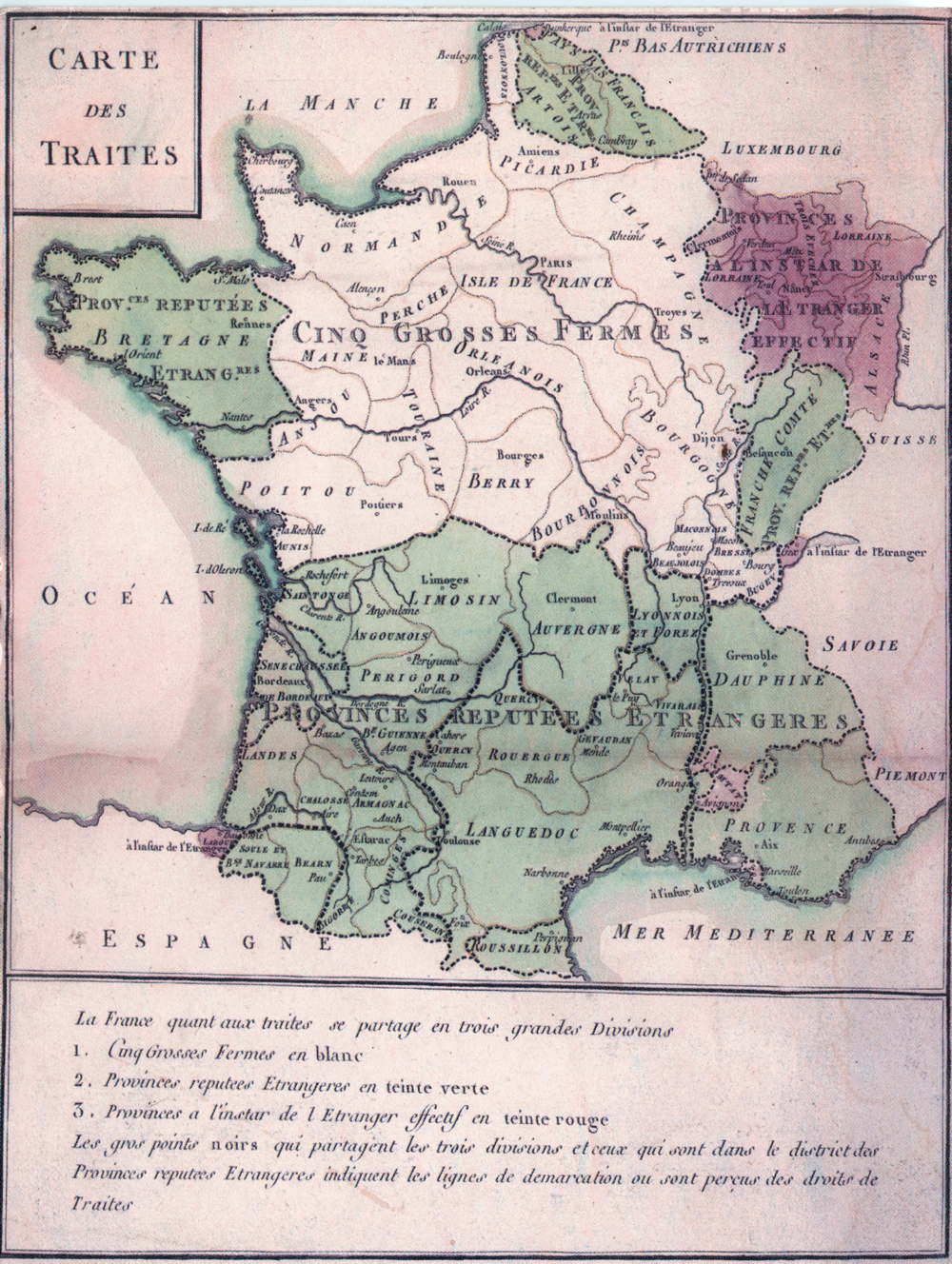
French customs in 1732 roughly clinging to linguistic boundaries

Although gradually curtailed starting 1620, the Basques in the Kingdom of France maintained a semi-autonomous status favoured by their peripheral location and common bonds with their peer Basque districts in Spain, ruled by a similar self-empowerment system. However, each district held a different governmental and legal jurisdiction, with lawsuits considered on appeal before the Parliament of Gascony in Bordeaux (Labourd), and Navarre in Pau (Lower Navarre, Soule).

Labourd was the most dynamic French Basque district, showing total autonomy in its fiscal system during the mid-18th century, but also a declining fishing industry, half-hearted trade routes with the Americas, and lack of products with added value capable of enticing trade. Its decision-making body was the Biltzar, or Assembly of Labourd, a highly participatory, democratic body. The weight of the nobility was remarkably low.

Lower Navarre nominally remained a kingdom apart from France located at the feet of the Pyrenean passes and benefiting from the cross-border trade routes, e.g. Pamplona-Bayonne. Soule's basic legal document was the Custom, or Kostüma, but all relevant powers of its decision-making body, the Estates-General, were suppressed by 1733. The Estates of Lower Navarre went through a similar fate when litigation with officials in Pau led to their legislating powers being severely curtailed by royal decree in 1748. Relations between the crown and the Basques were increasingly uneasy, due to the crown's demanding nature in terms of fiscal contribution and decision-making attributions.

== Abolition during the French Revolution ==
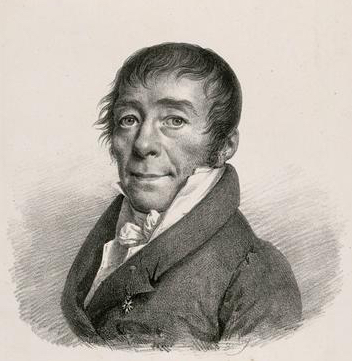
Dominique J. Garat, last representative of Labourd and chief official in Paris

In 1789, estates representatives were called to the Jeu de Paume in Paris by King Louis XVI. It was attended by the Basque deputies, six per district. In January 1790, a clean-sweep administrative design was put forward in the National Assembly that superseded Basque home rule. The new ideological design abolished all ethnic or traditional bonds, with the new Lower Pyrenees department Basques merging Bearn and the Basque districts into one single administrative unit, where Basques remained a minority.

The Basques, spearheaded by the enlightened Garat brothers, Dominique Joseph and Dominique the Old, regarded with disbelief the proposal and opposed it in vehement addresses to the assembly, Uhart and Escuret-Laborde, representatives of Soule, equally spoke out against it and stood up for their foruak, for which they were jeered, and abandoned the chamber. The Navarrese representatives (Franchisteguy, Polverel) decided not to vote after Louis XVI entitled himself King of the French, instead of the customary King of France and Navarre, arguing that they were not part of France and suggesting the possibility of creating a separate entity. The tiny Principality of Bidache, which, since the 16th century, claimed sovereignty apart from Navarre, did not send representatives to the Estates, but was declared part of the French department.

The Basque representatives, citing their linguistic and cultural difference to Bearn, went on to come up with an alternative design that would merge all three Basque districts into one department. During this period, Basque was the common everyday language in all three provinces, with a majority of Basque monolingual population and a number of asymmetric Basque-Gascon (Bearnese) bilinguals; at this point, Biarritz, Bayonne, and Bidache were for the most part Gascon speaking.

The decree establishing the départément system, was followed by the creation of the Basses-Pyrenees department in February 1790. The bill for a Basque department was also rejected. On hearing the news of the French decision, an astonished Biltzar of Labourd stripped the Garat brothers of their office for eventually voting in favour of the French departmental design. Likewise minor territorial entities were redesigned, most notably, merging Ustaritz and Bayonne to dysfunctional effects, right after the 1780s separation of Labourd from the latter as demanded by its assembly of representatives (Biltzar).

In 1791, the new Constitution was passed, confirming the administrative arrangement voted in 1790. Dominique Garat the Old refused to distribute copies of the new constitution on the grounds that there was no Basque-language version. France was still a kingdom, so the status quo remained in place, but political developments started to shift from evolutionary to revolutionary. The kingdom turned into a Republic in September 1792, the Jacobins and the National Convention rose to prominence, followed by the arrest, trial and eventual execution of King Louis XVI (January 1793). An international alliance was formed to counter revolutionary France.

== War of the Pyrenees ==
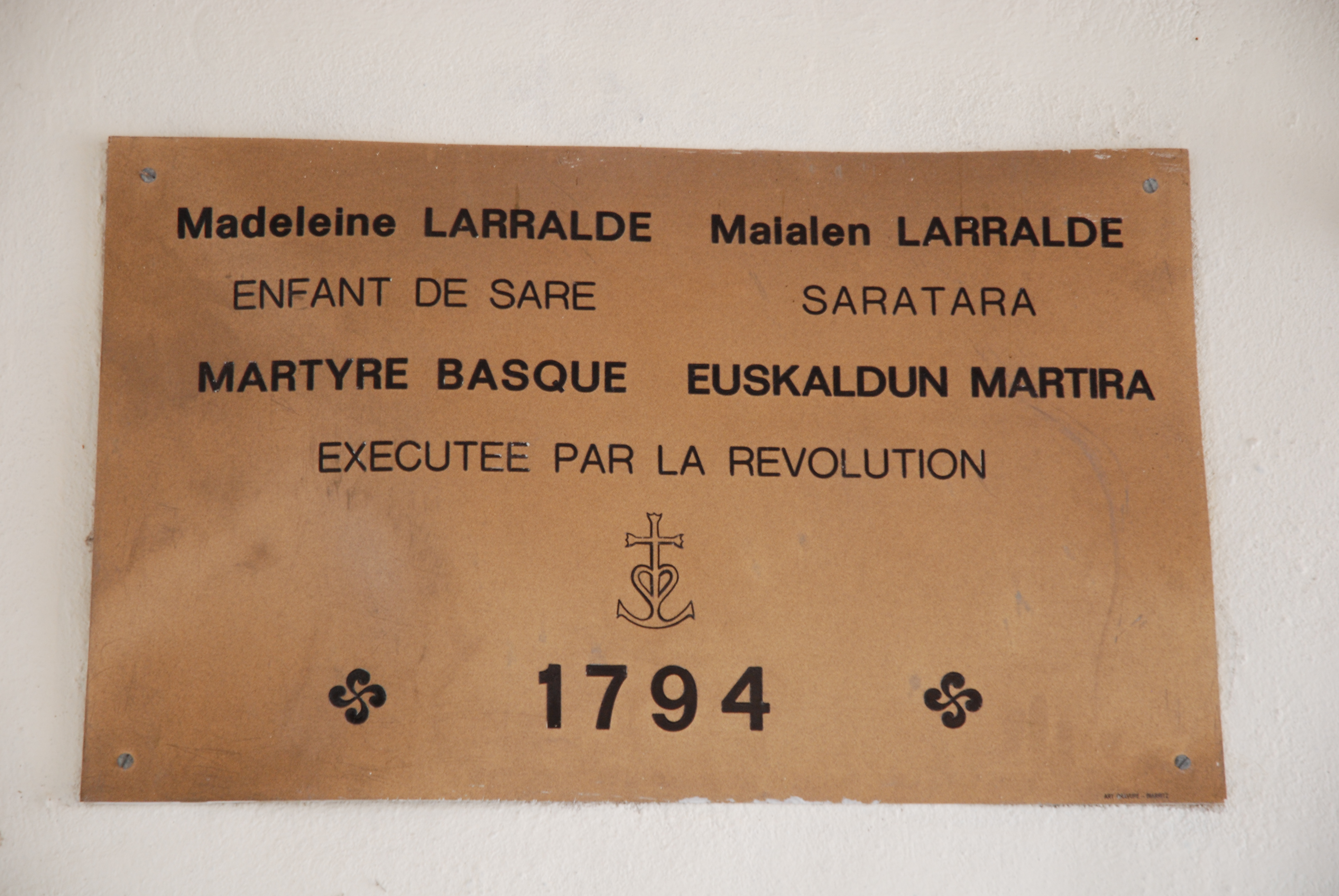
Memorial plaque inside the St. Martin church to a victim of the 1793-1795 repression (Sara, Labourd)

The new order was not implemented until the War of the Pyrenees, with the arrival of the Army of the Pyrenees. The area came under direct military control. In the run-up to the execution of the King Louis XVI in January 1793, tension mounted when the clergy was required to vow loyalty to the French Constitution and the replacement of local priests by constitutional clergymen coming from elsewhere in France.

On the outbreak of the War of the Pyrenees, the Basque population was required to join the army. Very few attended the call, and the Basques were considered hostile to the French republic. Terror was considered to abash the Basques, and the moment seemed to arrive when scores of youths defected their positions in the French army and fled to the Spanish Basque region across the border.

The regional republican authorities decided the implementation of mass repression in southern Labourd. Basque was prohibited in most public contexts, claiming that "fanaticism speaks Basque." In the spring of 1794, thousands were forced out of their homes, regrouped, and segregated by age and sex, then conducted in a long column to at least 40 km away of their houses, to the vicinity of Capbreton. Several hundreds died, and their possessions were burnt or confiscated.

Within months, many deportees managed to come back home when the Jacobin National Convention collapsed, only to find their properties in the hands of French "patriots". A trial took place to clarify responsibilities during the Thermidorian Reaction, but no high- or mid-ranking officials were found accountable. Turmoil and unrest ensued in southern Labourd triggered by a desire for restoration and revenge, leading for example to the assassination in Ustaritz of Monsieur Mundutegi, a local proponent of the mass deportation. Many victims and dissidents of the new regime took to exile.

== The Basques after abolition of home rule ==
"The French Basques have acquired neither the customs of France, nor their language, while the Spanish Basques have not either acquired the Spanish customs, or their language. Either of them have kept being Basque (...) The Spanish Basques and the French Basques both think they all belong to the nobility, translating that idea to their customs and laws. That fact is astounding, for all the individuals of the seven provinces agree, acquiesce on that notion."
Dominique Joseph Garat, Report to Napoleon Bonaparte, 1803

While the harshest period of the First French Republic was gone, the repressive events were to leave an indelible, damaging effect in the Basque collective psyche. It became the earliest chapter aimed at diluting the Basques in the new French national arrangement. The foundation of the idea of modernity associated to the French nation-state deprived the Basques from a specific cultural and political identity.

During the next decades, the Basques defected from the French army in alarming numbers amidst accusations of discrimination and mistreatment. Still Dominique Joseph Garat, a high-ranking official close to Bonaparte at the turn of the 19th century, put forward the possibility of establishing a buffer Basque principality loyal to France. However, while aspects of that idea started to be implemented in the Spanish Basque districts as of 1810, no such idea came to be considered by Bonaparte for the French Basque Country.

In 1804, the Napoleonic Civil Code was decreed, breaking up the native legal approach to inheritance and property, bringing about the fragmentation of the family's farmstead and restriction to communal lands (duties required by the state), prompting yet further emigration waves. These institutional and legal events were coupled with exactions, recruitment and requisitioning implemented by the different military expeditions during the successive wars, e.g. Peninsular War. Half a century later, the prefect of the Basses-Pyrénées lamented the decrease of 80.000 inhabitants in the population across the region due to taxation and regular military draft, a remark conveniently highlighted by Fermin Lasala to make a case for the continuation of the Basque institutional specificity on the eve of its permanent suppression in the Basque Provinces (1876). The bulk of the French Basques continued to oppose the idea of a French republic still for over a century, yearning for the restitution of the former regime and their native institutions.

== See also ==
- End of Basque home rule in Spain
- History of the Basques
- Jean-Baptiste Cavaignac
- Reign of Terror
- War of La Vendée
- Peasants' War (1798)
- Institutions of the French Basque Country before 1789

== Sources ==
- Bolinaga, Iñigo (2012). La alternativa Garat. Donostia-San Sebastián: Txertoa. ISBN 978-84-7148-530-4.
- Douglass, William A.; Douglass, Bilbao, J. (2005). Amerikanuak: Basques in the New World. Reno, NV: University of Nevada Press. ISBN 0-87417-625-5.
- Esparza Zabalegi, Jose Mari (2012). Euskal Herria Kartografian eta Testigantza Historikoetan. Euskal Editorea SL. ISBN 978-84-936037-9-3.
- Mina, María Cruz (1990). "Historia y Política: Las Vicisitudes de una Ley". In Arriazkuenaga, Joseba; Urquijo Goitia, Jose Ramón (eds.). 150 Años del Convenio de Bergara y la Ley del 25 -X - 1939. Eusko Legebiltzarra/Parlamento Vasco. ISBN 84-87122-14-0.
- Watson, Cameron (2003). Modern Basque History: Eighteenth Century to the Present. University of Nevada, Center for Basque Studies. ISBN 1-877802-16-6.
