= Benafarces =

Coordinates: 41°37′N 5°17′W

Benafarces, Spain
- Flag Coat of arms

- Church of Asunción
- Country: Spain
- Autonomous community: Castile and León
- Province: Valladolid
- Municipality: Benafarces

Area
  - Total: 16.65 km^{2} (6.43 sq mi)
- Elevation: 743 m (2,438 ft)

Population (2025-01-01)
  - Total: 68
  - Density: 4.1/km^{2} (11/sq mi)
- Time zone: UTC+1 (CET)
  - Summer (DST): UTC+2 (CEST)

Benafarces is a municipality located in the province of Valladolid, Castile and León, Spain. According to the 2004 census (INE), the municipality had a population of 114 inhabitants.

In 1147 Osorio Martínez granted a fuero to Benafarces with the approval of Alfonso VII. The village in turn was required to make an annual payment in kind of half a sheep, ten loaves of bread, some barley, and some must.
