= Cotanes del Monte =

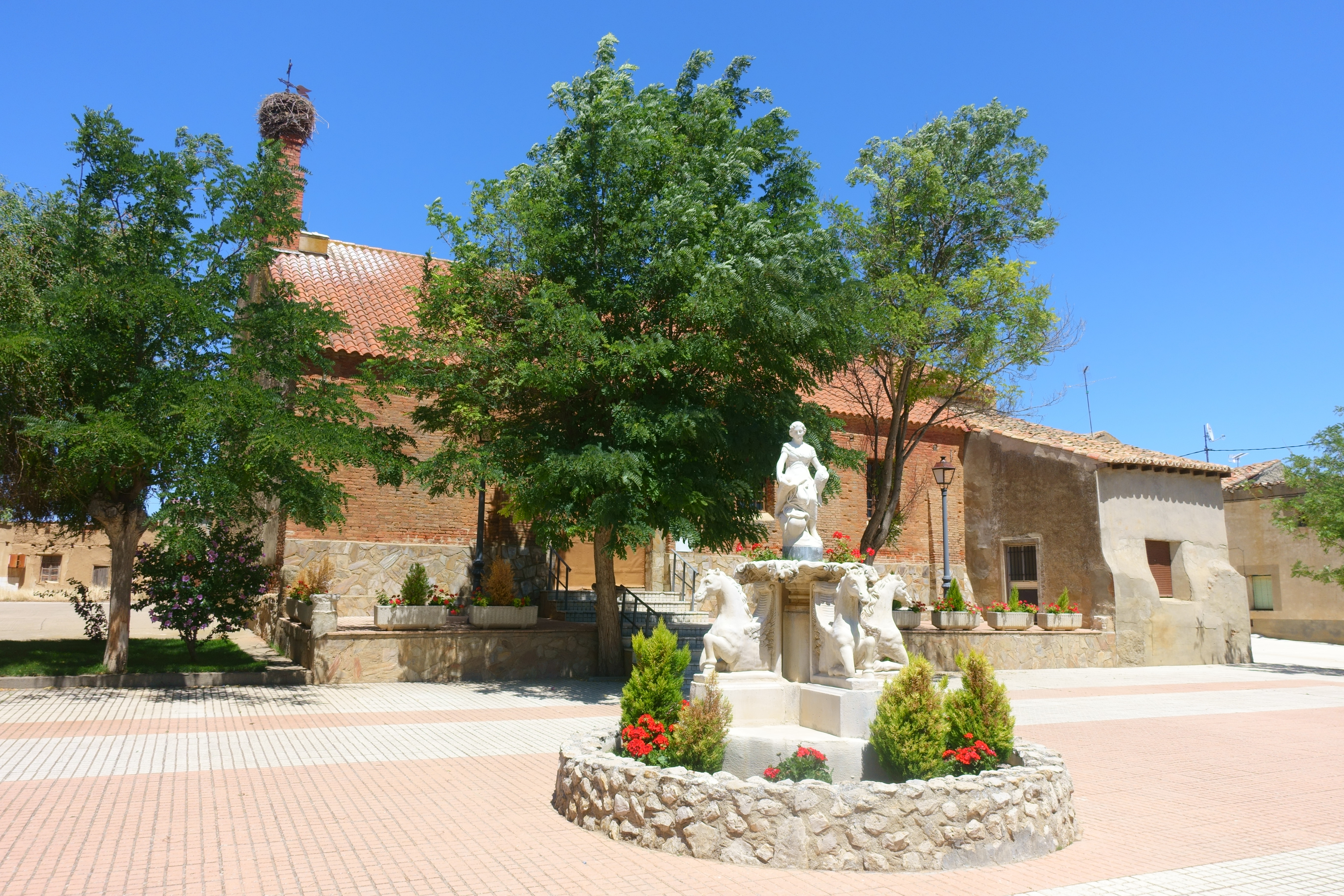

- Flag Coat of arms

- Location in Spain Cotanes del Monte (Spain)
- Coordinates: 41°49′00″N 5°17′00″W
- Country: Spain
- Autonomous community: Castile and León
- Province: Zamora
- Comarca: Tierra de Campos

Area
  - Total: 14 km^{2} (5.4 sq mi)

Population (2025-01-01)
  - Total: 79
  - Density: 5.6/km^{2} (15/sq mi)
- Time zone: UTC+1 (CET)
  - Summer (DST): UTC+2 (CEST)

Cotanes del Monte is a municipality located in the province of Zamora, Castile and León, Spain. According to the 2009 census (INE), the municipality has a population of 129 inhabitants.
