= Monasterio de Vega =

Coordinates: 42°14′N 5°11′W

Monasterio de Vega, Spain
- Flag Coat of arms

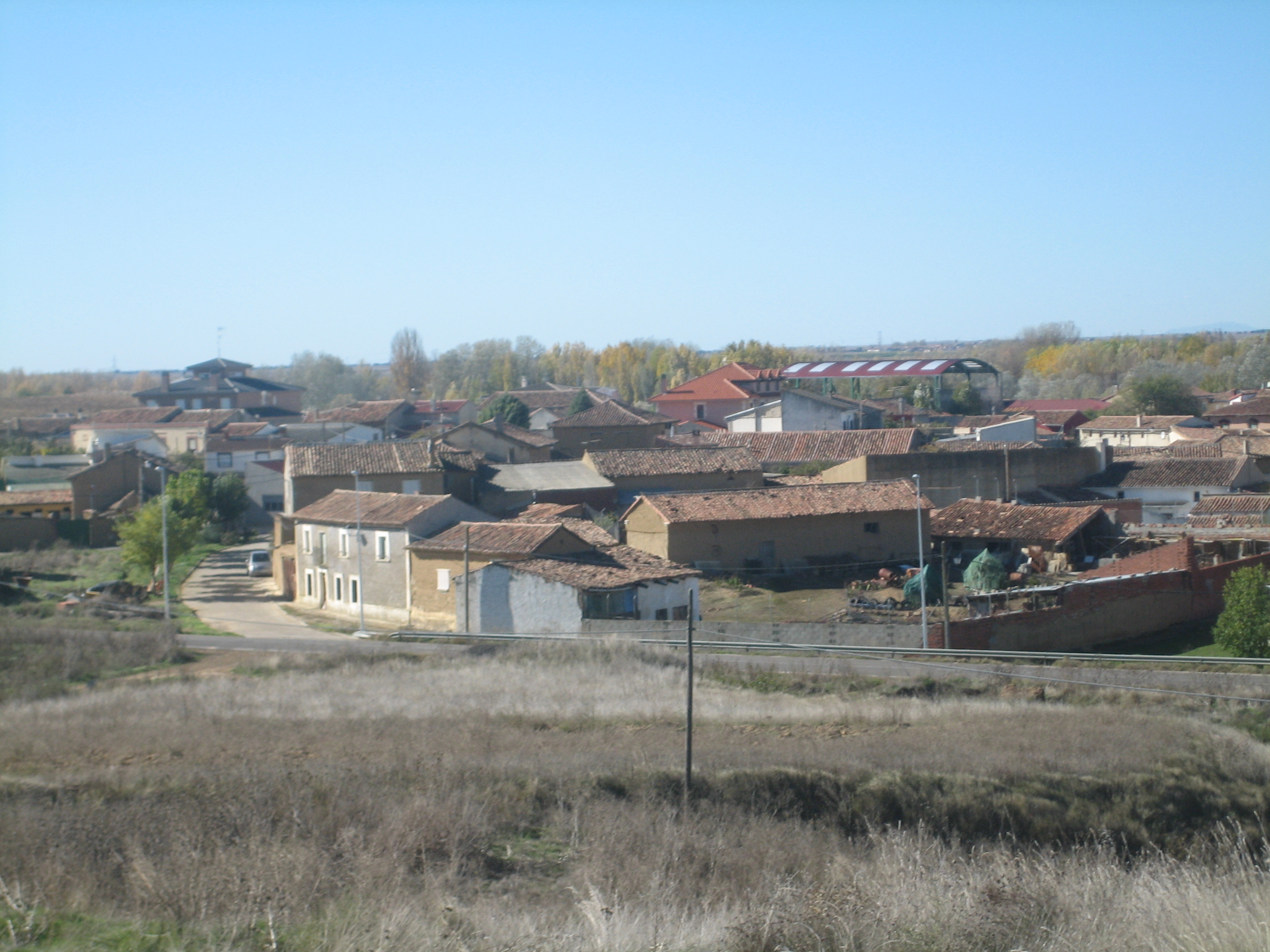
- Panoramic view
- Country: Spain
- Autonomous community: Castile and León
- Province: Valladolid
- Municipality: Monasterio de Vega

Area
  - Total: 30 km^{2} (12 sq mi)

Population (2025-01-01)
  - Total: 79
  - Density: 2.6/km^{2} (6.8/sq mi)
- Time zone: UTC+1 (CET)
  - Summer (DST): UTC+2 (CEST)

Monasterio de Vega is a municipality located in the province of Valladolid, Castile and León, Spain. According to the 2019 census (INE), the municipality has a population of 77 inhabitants.
