= San Cebrián de Campos =

Coordinates: 42°12′N 4°32′W

- municipality
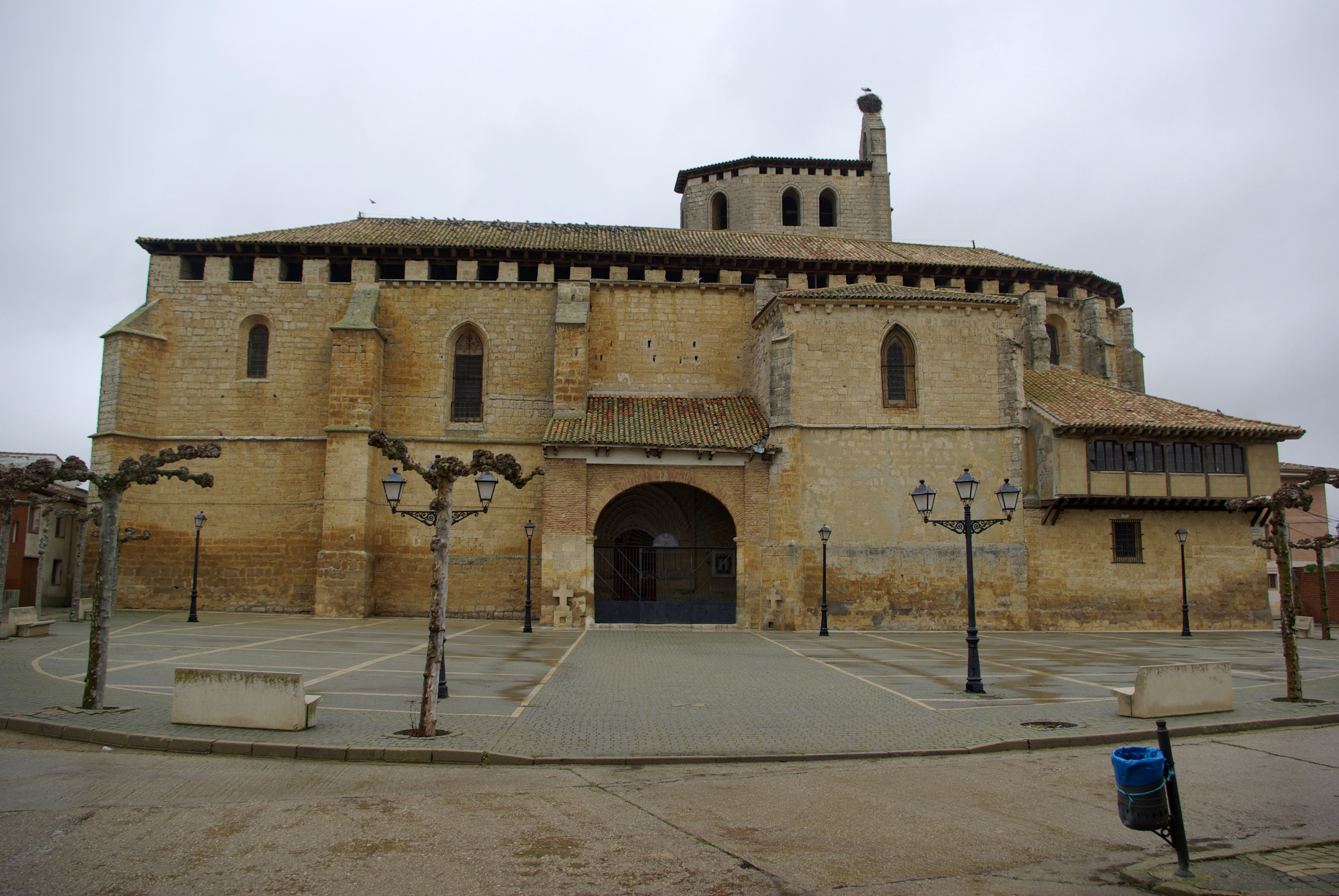

- Flag Coat of arms
- Interactive map of San Cebrián de Campos
- Country: Spain
- Autonomous community: Castile and León
- Province: Palencia
- Municipality: San Cebrián de Campos

Area
  - Total: 32 km^{2} (12 sq mi)
- Elevation: 780 m (2,560 ft)

Population (2025-01-01)
  - Total: 400
  - Density: 13/km^{2} (32/sq mi)
- Time zone: UTC+1 (CET)
  - Summer (DST): UTC+2 (CEST)
- Climate: Cfb
- Website: Official website

San Cebrián de Campos is a municipality located in the province of Palencia, Castile and León, Spain. According to the 2004 census (INE), the municipality has a population of 471 inhabitants.

== See also ==
- Tierra de Campos
