= Pozuelo de la Orden =

Coordinates: 41°49′N 5°15′W

Pozuelo de la Orden, Spain
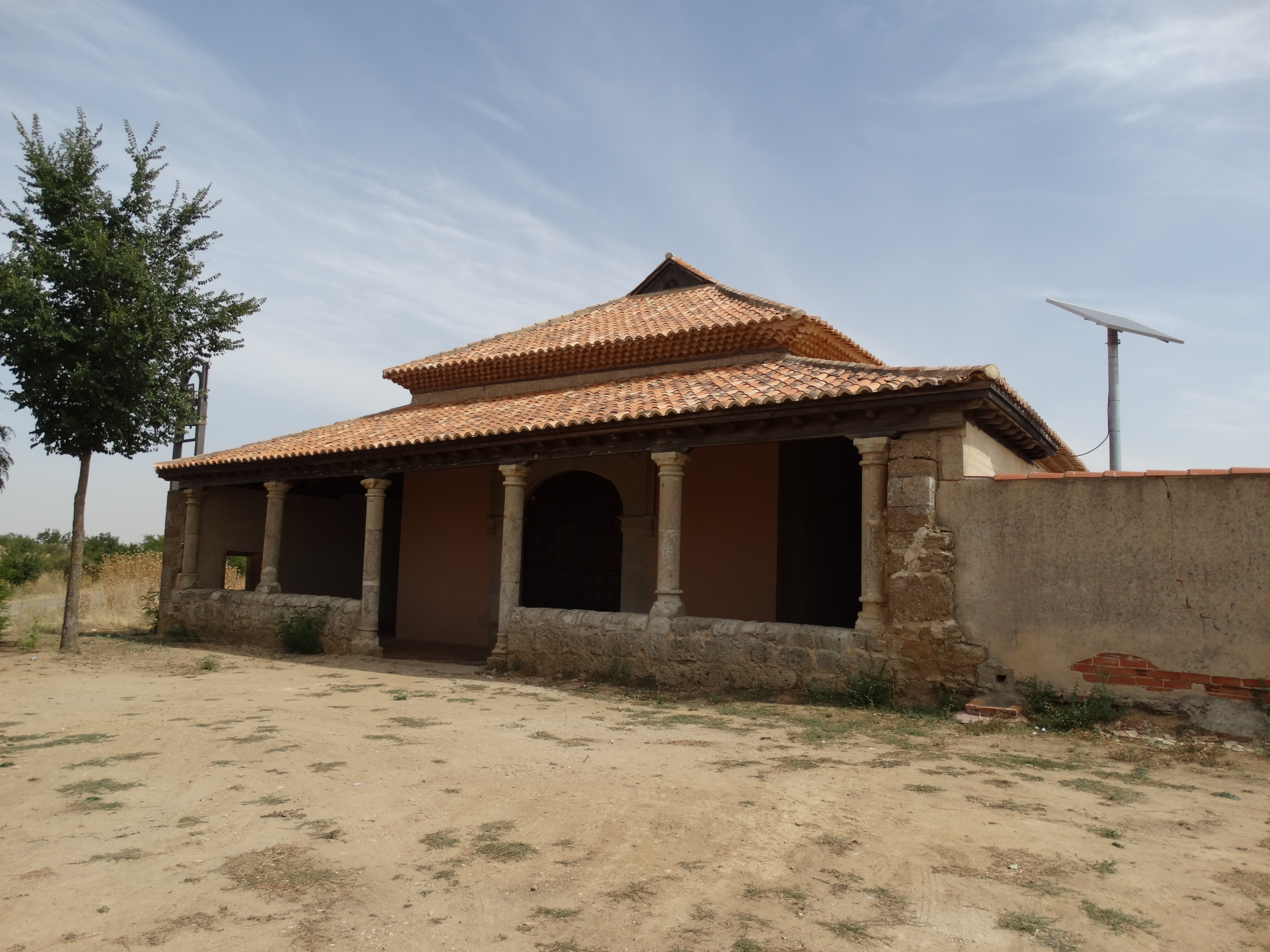
- Pozuelo de la Orden - Ermita de Santa Ana, a building with a Mudejar coffered ceiling of great value and paintings from the 17th century recovered in the last restoration.

- Coat of arms
- Interactive map of Pozuelo de la Orden, Spain
- Country: Spain
- Autonomous community: Castile and León
- Province: Valladolid
- Municipality: Pozuelo de la Orden

Area
  - Total: 20 km^{2} (7.7 sq mi)

Population (2025-01-01)
  - Total: 56
  - Density: 2.8/km^{2} (7.3/sq mi)
- Time zone: UTC+1 (CET)
  - Summer (DST): UTC+2 (CEST)

Pozuelo de la Orden is a municipality located in the province of Valladolid, Castile and León, Spain. According to the 2004 census (INE), the municipality has a population of 75 inhabitants.
