= Kingdom of León =

Medieval state on the Iberian Peninsula

Coordinates: 42°35′54″N 05°34′13″W

Kingdom of León Regno de Lleon / Lleom (Old Leonese) Reinu de Llión (Asturian) Reino de León (Spanish) Reino de León (Galician) Reino de Leão (Portuguese) Reino de Lhion (Mirandese) Regnum Legionense (Latin)
- 910–1833
- Royal flag Shield

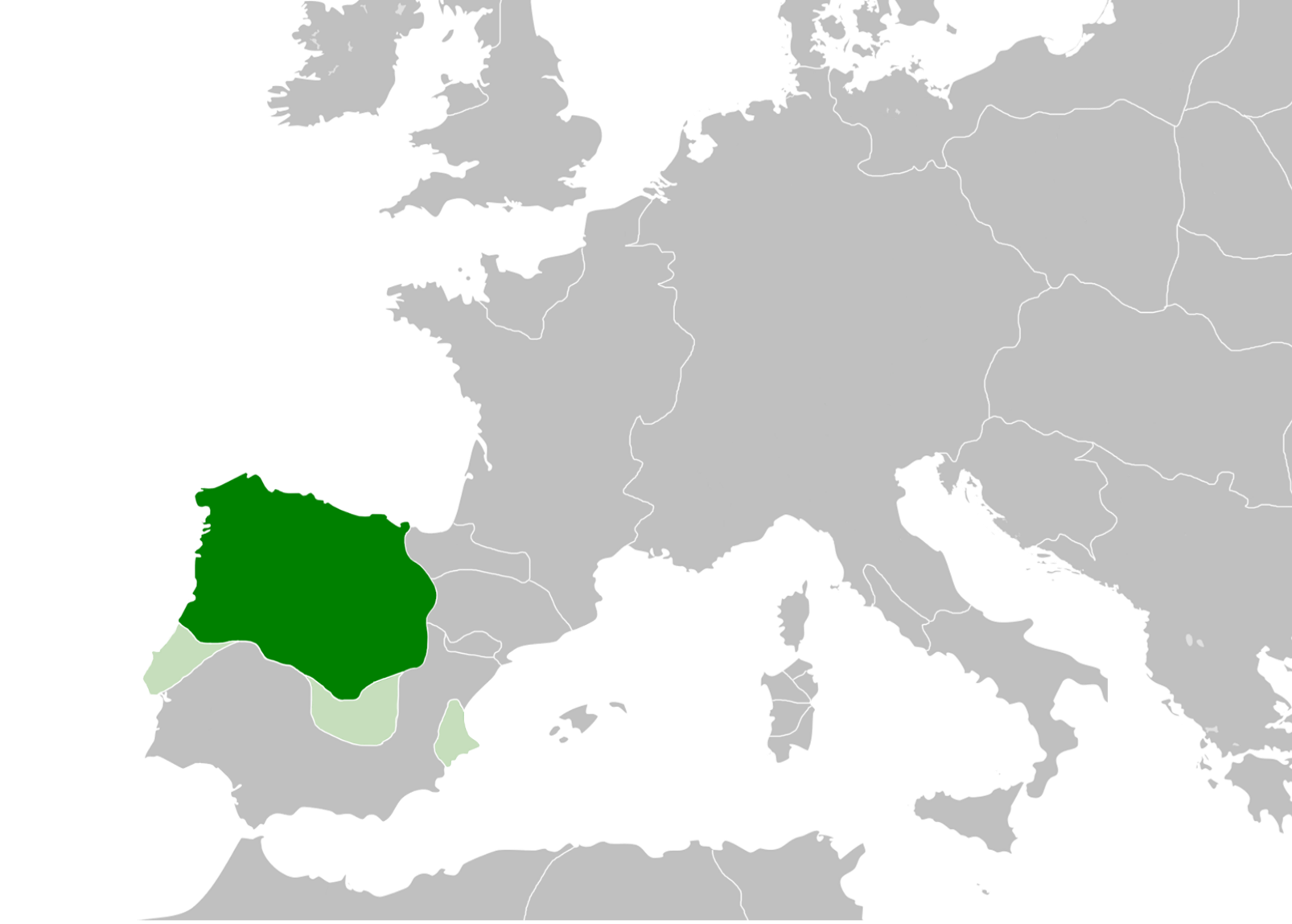
- The Kingdom of León (green) in 1095
- Capital: León
- Common languages: Old Leonese, Galician-Portuguese, Castilian, Latin, Mozarabic
- Religion: Latin Christianity (official) Minority Judaism
- Government: Feudal monarchy
- King
  - 910–914: García I (first)
  - 1188–1230: Alfonso IX (last before union with Castile)
- Legislature: Cortes of León
- Historical era: Middle Ages
  - Established: 910
  - Permanent union of Castile and León: 10 December 1230
  - 1833 territorial division of Spain: 1833
Preceded by	Succeeded by
Kingdom of Asturias; Kingdom of Galicia	Spain
- Today part of: Spain; Portugal

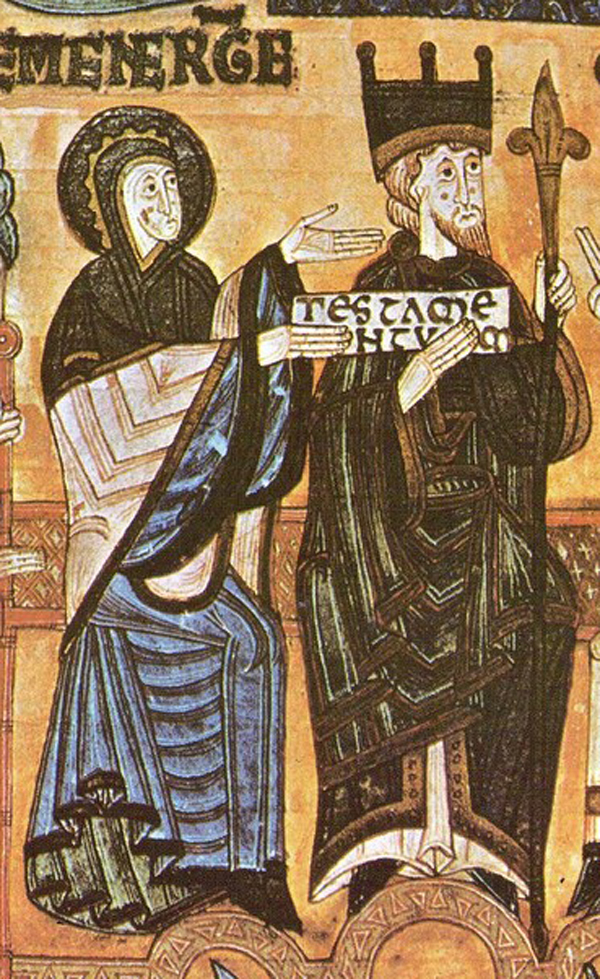
Alfonso the Great (848–910), king of León, Galicia and Asturias

The Kingdom of León (Note: UK: /leɪˈɒn/, US: /-ˈoʊn/; Spanish: [leˈon]; Asturian: Reinu de Llión; Spanish: Reino de León; Galician: Reino de León; Portuguese: Reino de Leão; Latin: Regnum Legionense; Mirandese: Reino de Lhion) was a medieval state situated in the northwest region of the Iberian Peninsula. It was founded in 910, when the Christian princes of Asturias along the northern coast of the peninsula shifted their capital from Oviedo to the city of León. The kings of León fought civil wars, wars against neighbouring kingdoms, and invasions by the Moors and the Vikings, to sustain their kingdom through a turbulent age.

García is the first of the kings described by the charters as reigning in León. It is generally assumed that the old Asturian kingdom was divided among the three sons of Alfonso III of Asturias: García (León), Ordoño (Galicia) and Fruela (Asturias), as all three participated in deposing their father. When García died in 914, León went to Ordoño, who now ruled both León and Galicia as Ordoño II. At Ordoño's death in 924, the throne went to his brother Fruela II (924–925), who died of leprosy a year later. Fruela's death in 925 was followed by a civil war, after which Alfonso, the eldest son of Ordoño II, emerged as the new king Alfonso IV, ruling from 925 to 932. After a further power struggle, Ramiro, the younger brother of Alfonso IV, became king in 932, having captured his brother Alfonso, as well as the three sons of Fruela II – Alfonso, Ordoño and Ramiro. Alfonso IV may have died soon after, but he left two infant sons, called Ordoño and Fruela. When Ramiro died in 951, he left two sons by two different wives. When the elder son Ordoño III, who ruled from 951 to 956, suddenly died aged little more than thirty, he was succeeded by his younger half-brother Sancho I "The Fat" (956–966), as Ordoño had failed to produce a legitimate heir.

Sancho's son Ramiro had been born in 961 and was only about five years old when his father died. He was also the only legitimate member of the direct family line. His mother Teresa Ansúrez had retired into the recently founded monastery of San Pelayo, of which her sister-in-law Elvira was the abbess. Another nun, Sancho's full sister Elvira Ramírez emerged as regent during his long minority. Under the regency of Elvira, fresh raids of the Northmen were repelled from the coast of Galicia. In 968, Gunrod of Norway, the Viking leader, established himself on Galician soil and held out for a year and a half: Bishop Sisnando of Compostela died fighting him, and his successor St Rudesind carried on the struggle until Count Gonzalo Sánchez defeated the invaders and killed Gunrod himself. Count Sánchez destroyed the entire fleet of Gunrod. In 1008, Norman Vikings attacked Galicia, destroying Santiago de Compostela and seventeen other towns, while Olaf Haraldsson of Norway raided Spain's Atlantic coast. There are also reports of a series of attacks on the Christian lands of north Spain in 1028, 1032, and 1038, and the Christian kingdoms in the north commonly used Vikings as mercenaries in their internecine wars.

The County of Castile split off in 931, and the County of Portugal separated to become the independent Kingdom of Portugal in 1139. The Kingdom of León expanded south beyond the Douro, and then beyond the Sistema Central in the 10th, 11th and 12th centuries into the so-called Extremadura Leonesa, whose southern frontier was primarily settled by military orders. The Kingdom of León became part of a personal union with Kingdom of Castile since the 1230s, in dispute from 1296 to 1300. It remained from then on and up to 1833 a constituent realm of the Crown of Castile and then the Spanish Crown.

== Background ==
The city of León was founded by the Legio VII Gemina ("twin seventh legion") of the Roman Empire. It was the headquarters of that legion in the Late Roman Empire and was a centre for trade in gold, which was mined at Las Médulas nearby. In 569, the city was conquered by the Arian Visigothic king Liuvigild, who did not harass the already well-established Catholic population. In 717, León fell again, this time to the Moors. However, León was one of the first cities retaken during the Reconquista and became part of the Kingdom of Asturias in 742.

León was a small town during this time, but one of the few former Roman cities in the Kingdom of Asturias which still held significance (the surviving Roman walls bear the medieval walling upon them). During Visigothic times, the city had served as a bishopric, and incorporating the city into Asturias brought legitimacy to the Asturian monarchs who sought to lead a unified Iberian church, during a time when most of the Iberian Peninsula was governed by Muslim powers.

== History ==
León was created as a separate kingdom when the Asturian king, Alfonso the Great, divided his realm among his three sons. León was inherited by García I (910–914) who moved the capital of the kingdom of Astures to León. His successor was Ordoño II of León (914–924). Ordoño II was also a military leader who brought expeditions from León south to Seville, Córdoba, and Guadalajara, in the heart of the Muslim territory.

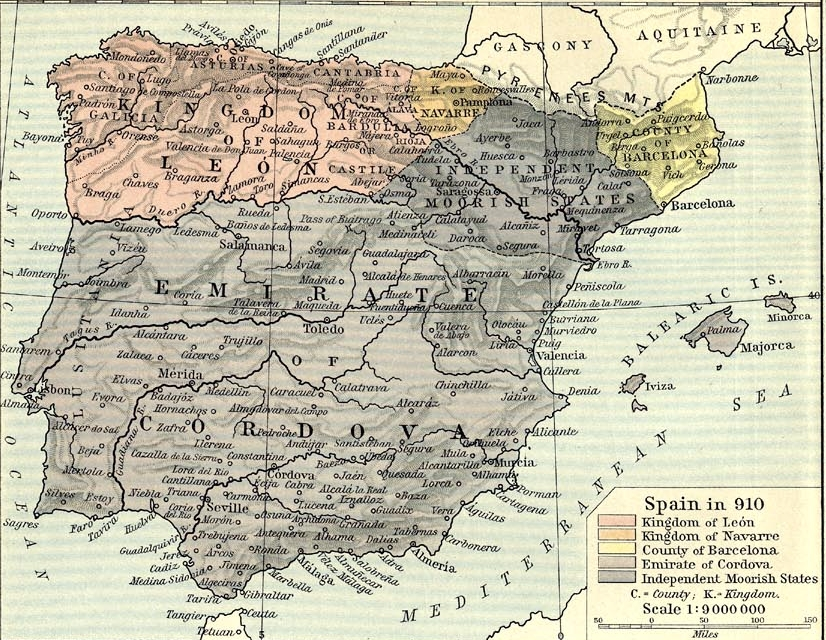
The new kingdom of León, 910

After a few years of civil wars during the reigns of Fruela II, Alfonso Fróilaz and Alfonso IV, Ramiro II (931–951) assumed the throne and brought stability to the kingdom. A brave military commander who defeated the Muslim armies in their own territory, Ramiro's expeditions turned the valley of the Douro into a no-man's land that separated Christian kingdoms in the north of Iberia from the Muslim states in the south. Ramiro II was nicknamed "The Devil" by Muslims because of his great military skill.

As the Leonese troops advanced they were followed by a process of repoblación, which consisted of repopulating the Meseta high plains, with people coming from Galicia and especially from Asturias and León. This migration of Asturian and Leonese peoples greatly influenced the Leonese language. During the repoblación period, there arose a distinct form of art known as Mozarabic art. Mozarabic art is a mixing of Visigoth, Islamic, and Byzantine elements. Notable examples of the Mozarabic style are the Leonese churches of San Miguel de Escalada and Santiago de Peñalba.

During the early 10th century, León expanded to the south and east, securing territory that became the County of Burgos. Fortified with numerous castles, Burgos remained within Leon until the 930s, at which time Count Ferdinand II of Castile began a campaign to expand Burgos and make it independent and hereditary. He took for himself the title Count of Castile, in reference to the many castles of the territory (around Burgos), and continued expanding his area at the expense of León by allying with the Caliphate of Córdoba, until 966, when he was defeated by Sancho I of León.

=== Viking raids ===
Sancho I died towards the end of 966 and five year old Ramiro III (966–982) ascended to the throne of León. In the second year of his reign, 968, a Viking fleet of 100 ships landed in Galicia led by king Gunrod. The Vikings defeated the Galician forces, and killed Sisnando, the bishop of Compostela. The defeat in the Battle of Fornelos left Galicia without an authority capable of facing the Vikings, who for three years camped comfortably, looting different Galician regions. In 971, Gunrod and his Vikings were surprised and defeated by Count Gonzalo Sánchez upon return towards Ría de Ferrol (where they had their stranded ships). The Galician troops captured Gunrod and many of his warriors, executing them all. Sporadic Viking assaults continued in the north of Spain even into the 11th century. In 1008, Galicia and the Douro region were attacked, and in 1014 or 1015 a major raid was launched against the city of Tui at the mouth of the Minho River. The Vikings managed to successfully capture the bishop and many of the town's inhabitants. The Knýtlinga saga and Gesta Danorum describe another big raid after this one, in the year 1028. It was led by Ulv Galiciefarer, who tried to go to the Ría de Arousa area and then became a mercenary for Rodrigo Romániz, but was defeated by the bishop of Compostela. The last recorded raids occurred during the period 1047–1066 when Cresconius, the bishop of Compostela, fought and won several battles against the Vikings.

=== Peak ===
The Kingdom of León in 1037

The Kingdom of León continued to be the most important of all those of the Iberian Peninsula. However, Sancho III of Navarre (1004–1035) took over Castile in the 1020s, and managed León in the last year of his life, leaving Galicia to temporary independence. In the division of lands which followed his death, his son Fernando succeeded to the county of Castile. Two years later, in 1037, he defeated the king of León who died in the battle and, because Fernando was married to the Leonese king's sister, he became king of León and Galicia. For nearly 30 years, until his death in 1065, he ruled over the kingdom of León and the county of Castile as Ferdinand I of León.

Early in its existence, León lay directly to the north of the powerful Caliphate of Córdoba. When internal dissensions divided Al-Andalus' loyalties in the 11th century, leading to the age of smaller Taifa successor states of the Caliphate, the Christian kingdoms, who had been sending tribute to the Caliphate, found themselves in a position to demand payments (parias) instead, in return for favours to particular factions or as simple extortion.

Thus, though scarcely influenced by the culture of the successor territories of the former Caliphate, Ferdinand I followed the example of the counts of Barcelona and the kings of Aragon and became hugely wealthy from the parias of the Taifas. When he died in 1065, his territories and the parias were split among his three sons, of whom Alfonso emerged the victor in the classic fratricidal strife common to feudal successions.

Ferdinand and his heirs (the kings of León and Castile) became the main benefactors of the Abbey of Cluny, where Abbot Hugh undertook construction of a third abbey church, the cynosure of every eye. The Way of Saint James called pilgrims from Western Europe to the supposed tomb of Saint James the Great in Santiago de Compostela, and the large hostels and churches along the route encouraged building in the Romanesque style.

Alfonso VI was one of the most important kings of León of the Middle Ages. He assumed control of first León, and later Castile and Galicia, when his brother died attacking the Leonese city of Zamora. He was crowned Emperor of Spain over all the kings of the Iberian Peninsula.

=== León and Castile ===
Flag of Kingdom of León at the times of King Alfonso VII (1105–1157)

Shield of Alfonso IX displayed in the Tumbo A manuscript of 12th century.

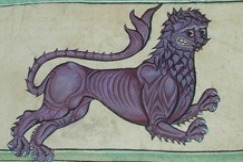
The purple lion emblem displayed in the Tumbo A.

The 1085 taking of Toledo by Alfonso VI of León was seen as an epochal event in medieval Iberia, as Toledo was the first major Andalusi city conquered by Christians. Modern historians see the fall of Toledo as marking a basic change in relations with the Moorish south, turning from the simple extortion of annual tribute to outright territorial expansion. Alfonso VI was drawn into local politics by strife within Toledo and inherited the political alliances of the city-state. He found himself faced with problems unfamiliar to him, such as appointing and dealing with a Catholic bishop in Toledo and the settling of garrisons in the small Muslim strongholds, the taifas, which were dependent on Toledo and which often bought the king's favour with gold from their trade with Al-Andalus and the Maghreb. Alfonso VI thus found his role as a Catholic king redefined as he governed large cities with sophisticated urban, Muslim subjects and growing Christian populations.

The two kingdoms of León and Castile were split in 1157, when a major defeat for Alfonso VII of Castile weakened the authority of Castile.

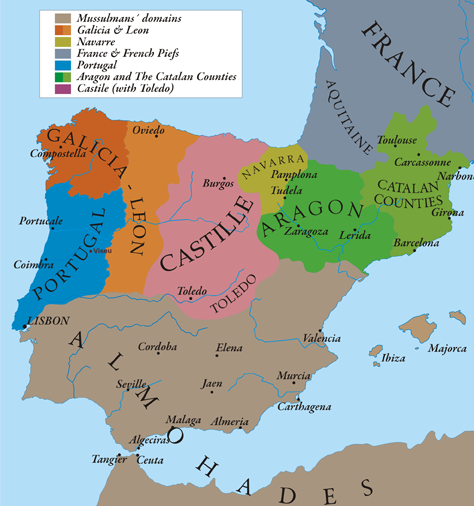
A map of the Kingdom of León in 1210

The last two kings of an independent Kingdom of León (1157–1230) were Ferdinand II and Alfonso IX. Fernando II led León's conquest of Mérida, a city dating from Roman times. Alfonso IX, besides conquering the whole of Extremadura (including the cities of Cáceres and Badajoz), was the most modern king of his time, founding the University of Salamanca in 1212 and summoning in 1188 the first parliament with representation of the citizenry ever seen in Europe, the Cortes of León.

Alfonso IX did not want his kingdom to disappear upon his death and designated his heirs as Sancha and Dulce, the daughters of his first wife. In order to maintain the independence of the Kingdom of León, Afonso IX applied in his testament the Galician right of inheritance, which granted men and women equality in succession, thus leaving his daughters to be the future queens of León. However, when Alfonso IX died in 1230, his son by Berenguela of Castile, Ferdinand III of Castile, invaded León and assumed the crown. He thus became the first joint sovereign of both kingdoms since the death of Alfonso VII in 1157. The isolated Atlantic province, the County of Portugal, had won independence in 1139 to become the Kingdom of Portugal.

The union between León and Castile was not accepted by the Leonese people. King Ferdinand III needed two years to suppress the secessionist revolts in the Kingdom of León, so his son Alfonso X restored the independence of the Kingdom of León. However, this was not respected by his son and successor, Sancho IV, whose brother John waited until 1296, following Sancho's death the previous year, to be crowned as John I, King of León, Galicia and Seville. In 1301, he abdicated, and the king of Castile assumed the Crown of León, reuniting the two kingdoms.

The Leonese royal arms with crest (after the union with Castile)

Though the kings of Castile and León initially continued to take the title King of León as the superior title, and to use a lion as part of their standard, power in fact became centralized in Castile, as exemplified by the Leonese language's replacement by Castilian. The Kingdom of León and the Kingdom of Castile kept different Parliaments, different flags, different coin and different laws until the Modern Era, when Spain, like other European states, centralized governmental power.

== Modern era ==
The Kingdom of León coexisted as a personal union under the Crown of Castile, with León possessing separate institutions, such as its own cortes, the Real Adelantamiento of the Kingdom of León, and the Merino mayor of León, among others, many of which lasted until the 19th century. The Castilian monarchs, however, soon began a process of unifying the laws of the two kingdoms, as exemplified by the Siete Partidas. By the 16th century, León became a captaincy-general.

== 19th century ==
In the 19th century, León declared war, together with Galicia and Asturias, against the First French Empire in the Peninsular War, and organised the Junta General del Reino de León as its own government. The modern region of León was established in 1833 and was divided into León, Zamora, and Salamanca provinces.

== Culture ==
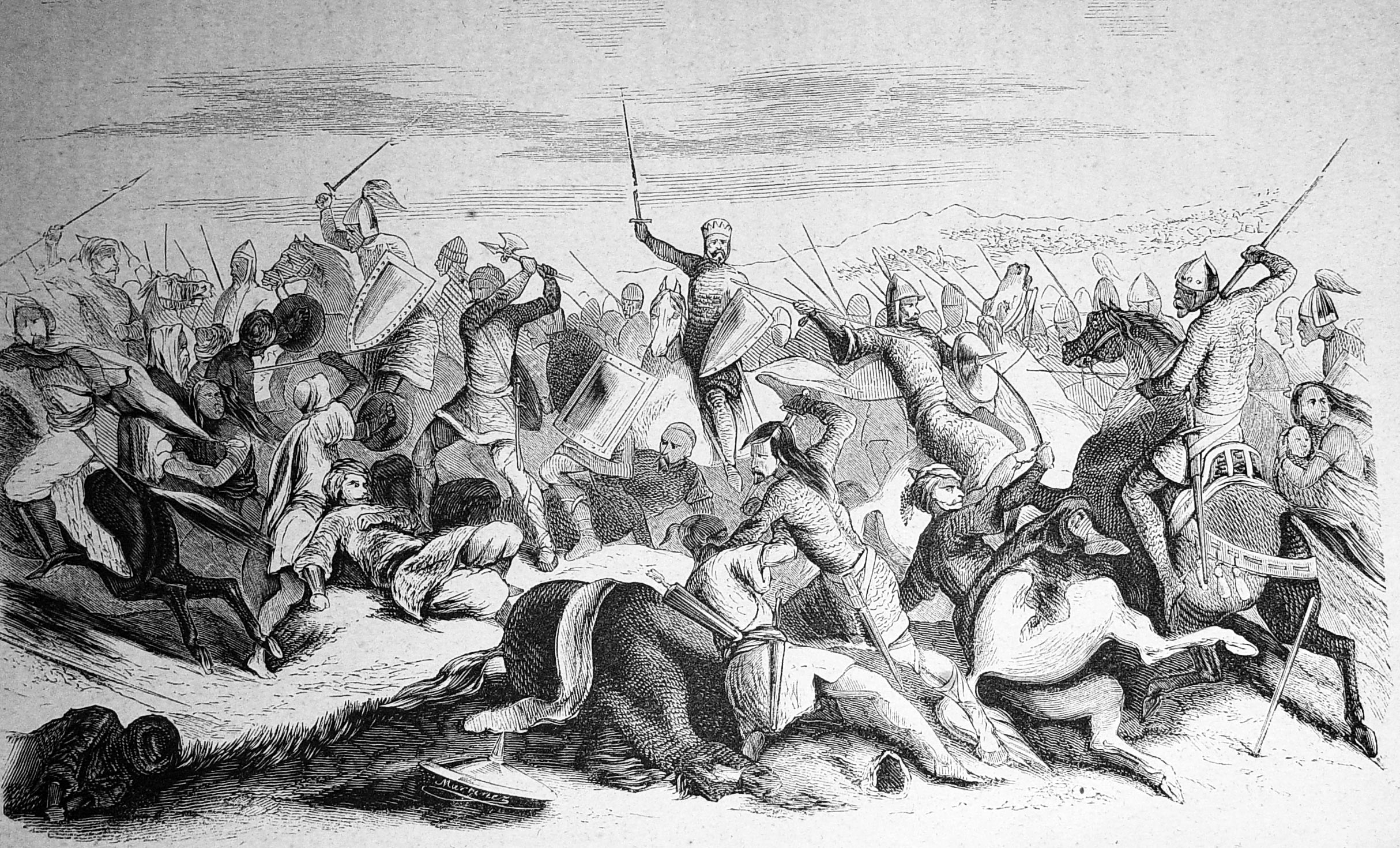
"Don Ramiro of León defeats the Cordoban near Simancas" (1852)

The culture of the Kingdom of León was notable for its richness and diversity, reflecting its position as a political and religious center of Christianity in the Iberian Peninsula. Key Latin literary works such as the Codex Vigilanus and the Historia Legionense documented the kingdom's history and helped consolidate its legacy. The Fueros de León (1017), promulgated by Alfonso V, established a legal framework that was advanced for its time, while texts like the Glosas Emilianenses marked a significant step in the transition from Latin to Romance languages. Among the earliest proto-Romance texts produced in the Iberian Peninsula was the Nodicia de kesos. Another notable work of this period is the Codex Calixtinus, a manuscript linked to the Camino de Santiago, which served as a guide for pilgrims and underscored the cultural and spiritual importance of the pilgrimage, reinforcing León's connection to European Christianity.

Religion played a fundamental role in León's cultural expression. Monasteries and churches such as San Isidoro de León, Tábara, Samos, and Sahagún became key centers for intellectual and artistic production. At San Isidoro, a renowned scriptorium facilitated the copying and dissemination of liturgical, legal, and scientific manuscripts. The transition from the Hispano-Mozarabic rite to the Roman rite after the Council of Burgos (1080) marked a significant shift in religious and cultural practices.

Simultaneously, the Camino de Santiago emerged as a vital axis for cultural, artistic, and spiritual exchange. Pilgrims traveling through León brought with them new ideas, artistic styles, and liturgical practices, strengthening the kingdom's ties with the rest of Europe.

Religious and military orders also played a crucial role, combining defensive, administrative, and religious functions. Orders such as Santiago, Alcántara, and the Knights Templar managed strategic fortresses like the castles of Ponferrada and Cornatel, ensuring territorial control and the protection of the Camino de Santiago. They also promoted the construction of hospitals, churches, and hostels, facilitating the organization of reconquered territories and integrating cultural and economic networks within the kingdom.

The Kingdom of León's cultural richness was further enhanced by its interactions with other territories. Exchanges with al-Andalus, as well as the migration of Mozarabic communities, introduced artistic techniques and scientific knowledge. Additionally, relations with other Christian kingdoms fostered the consolidation of a shared identity rooted in Christianity.

== See also ==
- León (historical region)
- Leonesism
- List of Leonese monarchs
- Leonese language
- Heraldry of León
- History of Portugal
- History of Spain
- Kingdom of Galicia
