= Sack of Santiago de Compostela =

Viking plunder of Santiago in Spain in 968 CE

Sack of Santiago de Compostela (968)
- Part of Viking expansion
Date	968 AD
Location	Santiago de Compostela, Spain
Result	Viking victory

Belligerents
Kingdom of Galicia	Kingdom of Norway

Commanders and leaders
Sisnando Menéndez †	Gunrod

Strength
Unknown	8,000 warriors 100 ships

Casualties and losses
Unknown	Unknown

The sack (plundering) of Santiago de Compostela occurred in 968 AD, when a Viking fleet led by Gunrod entered and sacked the city of Santiago de Compostela in northern Hispania (now Spain). The attack had been encouraged by duke Richard I of Normandy. Three years later Gunrod attempted to sack the city again; however, this time his fleet was met with a powerful army and the sacking was averted.

== Event ==
In the year 968, a Norwegian Viking fleet led by Gunrod went to help the duke Richard I of Normandy (the grandson of the Viking chieftain Rollo, first duke of Normandy), who was afraid of a possible invasion by the Carolingian king Lothair I of France. Once the Franks had been defeated, the fleet of Gunrod stayed in Normandy, becoming a threat for Richard, so the Norman duke sent the Norsemen to another place by telling them about the existence of an important pilgrimage site in the north of Hispania, Santiago de Compostela, where they could pillage a huge treasure.

The fleet of Gunrod reached Galicia the same year. They crushed the Galician army at the battle of Fornelos, and then entered and sacked the city of Santiago de Compostela.

Three years after the sack of Santiago de Compostela, Gunrod attacked Galicia again, only to find a powerful army sent to put an end to the Viking expedition.

== See also ==
- Vikings in Iberia
- Battle of Remich
- Viking raid on Galicia and Asturias
- The Andalusi leader Almanzor led a successful campaign against Santiago in 997.
