= Viking raid on Galicia and Asturias =

Date	31 July 844
Location	Gijón and A Coruña
Result	Asturian victory

Belligerents
Kingdom of Asturias; Kingdom of Galicia	Norwegian Vikings

Commanders and leaders
Ramiro I of Asturias	Unknown

Strength
	150 ships

Casualties and losses
	70 longships burnt Heavy human losses

The Viking raid on Galicia and Asturias occurred in 844. Many longships were lost in the attack and the fleet retreated to Aquitaine.

== Raid ==
In 844, the Vikings, who at that time infested all the maritime provinces of Europe, made a descent at A Coruña, and began to raid the countryside, burning and pillaging. King Ramiro I of Asturias marched against them with a potent army, managed to rout the invaders with a prodigious slaughter, took many of them as prisoners, and burned the best part of their fleet. Ramiro's reception frightened the Viking raiders, so raiding parties no longer troubled the parts of Spain that were under the king's control.

== See also ==
- Viking raid on Seville
- Sack of Santiago de Compostela
