= Trezenzonio =

Galician monk

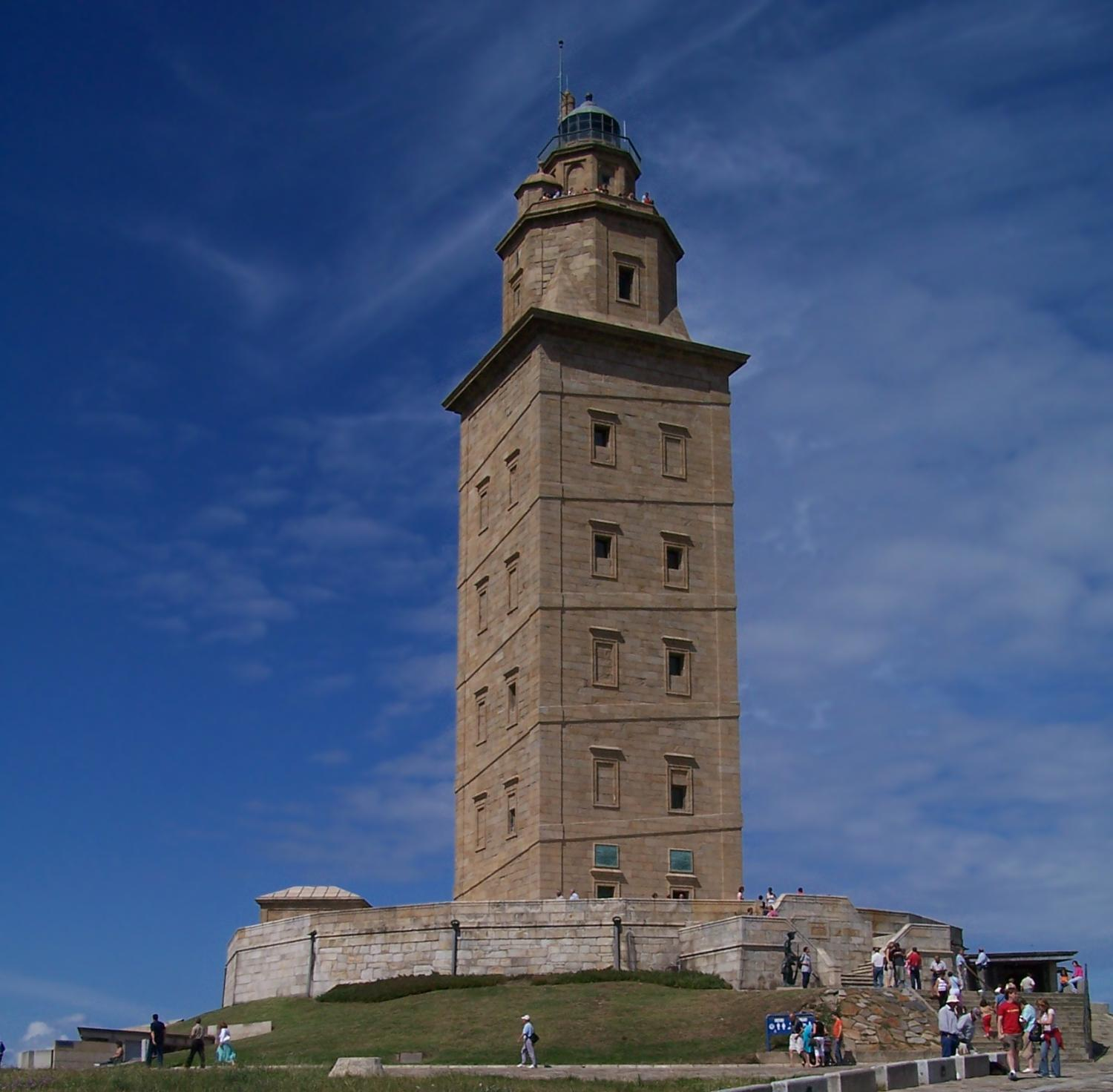
Imagen of the Tower of Hercules, from where Trezenzonio saw the Great Isle of Solstice.

Trezenzonio was a Galician monk who lived in times of the Asturian monarchy. Tradition attributes the deed of seeing and even visiting one of the islands of Paradise to him. His adventures were summoned in the Trezenzonii de Solistitionis Insula Magna, a medieval manuscript written in Latin in the 12th century.

After Galicia was once again plundered by one of the multiple raids with which the Muslims devastated the region in the 8th century, Trezenzonio went to the Tower of Hercules in A Coruña. There he took a look at the sea, where with the help of the first lights of the dawning he could see the Great Isle of Solstice (Magna Insula Solistitialis), which was consecrated to Saint Thecla (Santa Tecla). He decided to sail to that place and after having landed in that island he saw an immense prairie where a great basilica stood up, decorated with jewels and gems. In that island, the weather was delicious and there was plenty of food. Pain, hunger, fear and misfortunes were absent. Trezenzonio remained there for seven years after which an angel appeared to him and commanded him to return to Galicia.

Because he resisted the divine orders, he was punished with leprosy and had to witness powerless how the proofs of the existence of the Great Isle of Solstice that he had collected on his ship rotted. Trezenzonio repented of his actions. After landing in Galicia, he walked to the city of Tui, where he met the local bishop, Adelfio.

== Bibliography ==
- M.C. Díaz y Díaz, Visiones del Más Allá en Galicia durante la Alta Edad Media, Santiago de Compostela, Artes Gráficas Galicia, 1985
- P. d'Azevedo, Viagem á ilha de "Solistitionis" (Ms. do século XIV), Boletim da Clase de Letras. 622–629, Academia das Ciencias de Lisboa 12 (1918)
