= Beatus map =

Cartographic work of the European Early Middle Ages

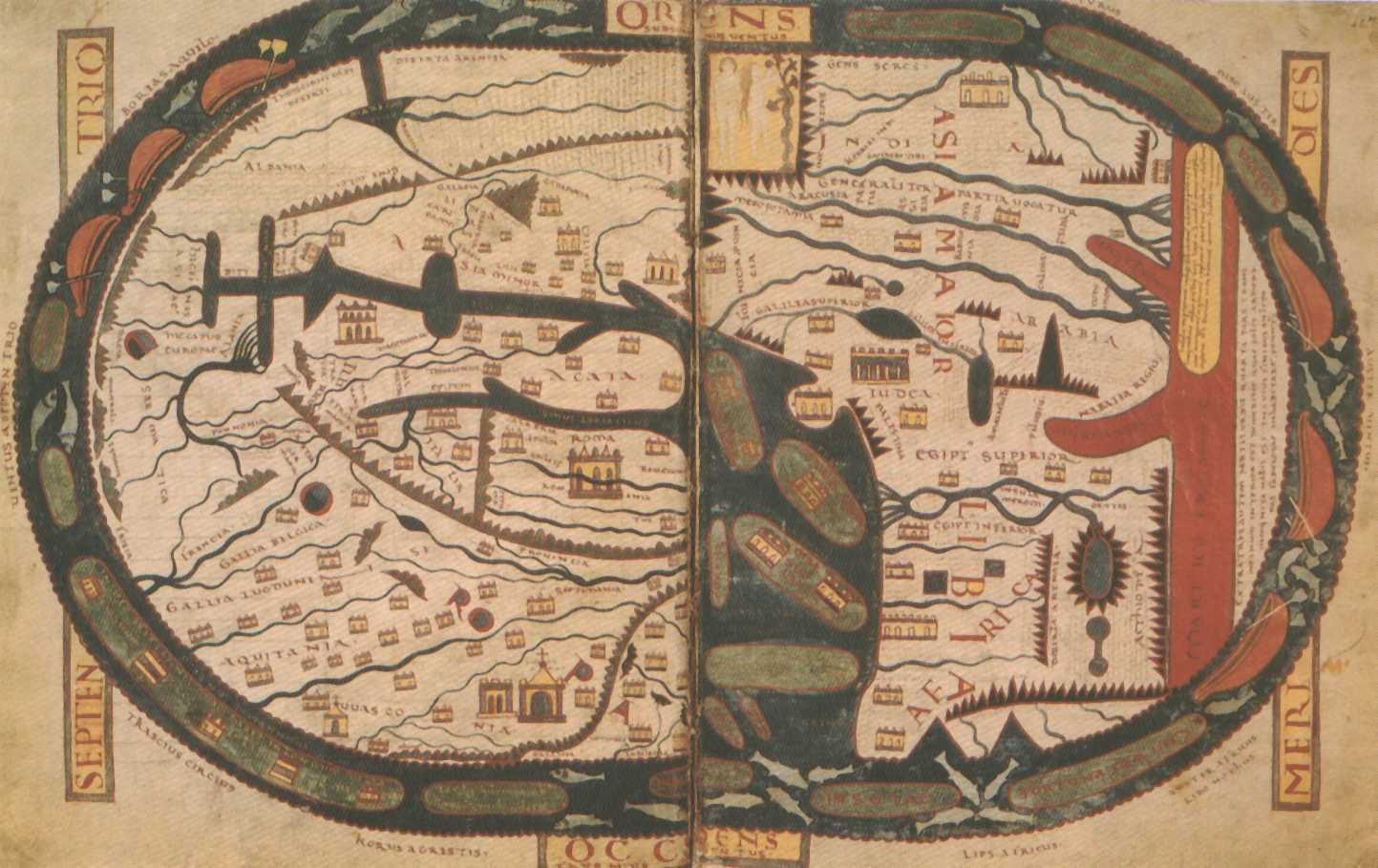
The image shows a copy of the Beatus map from the Saint-Sever Beatus, produced in Saint-Sever Abbey, France. The map is faced eastwards, and not northwards, as usual in modern cartography. For this reason it is said that the map is oriented.

The Beatus map or Beatine map is one of the most significant cartographic works of the European Early Middle Ages. It was originally drawn by the Spanish monk Beatus of Liébana, based on the accounts given by Isidore of Seville, Ptolemy and the Hebrew Bible. Although the original manuscript is lost, there remain several copies extant, which retain a high fidelity with respect to the original.

The map is shown in the prologue of the second book of Beatus' work Commentary on the Apocalypse. Its main goal is not to show a cartographically exact depiction of the world and its continents, but to illustrate the initial dispersion of the Apostles.

== The European world view in the Early Middle Ages ==
According to the descriptions from the Book of Genesis (which was one of the main sources for Beatus), the Earth was thought to be a flat plane, and sustained the vault of heaven, where the Sun, the Moon, and other minor luminaries like planets and stars, moved. There were two water masses. The waters above the firmament were contained by the vault of heaven and occasionally fell to Earth in as rain, when the floodgates opened. The waters below, fed the rivers, the streams and the great salt water masses.

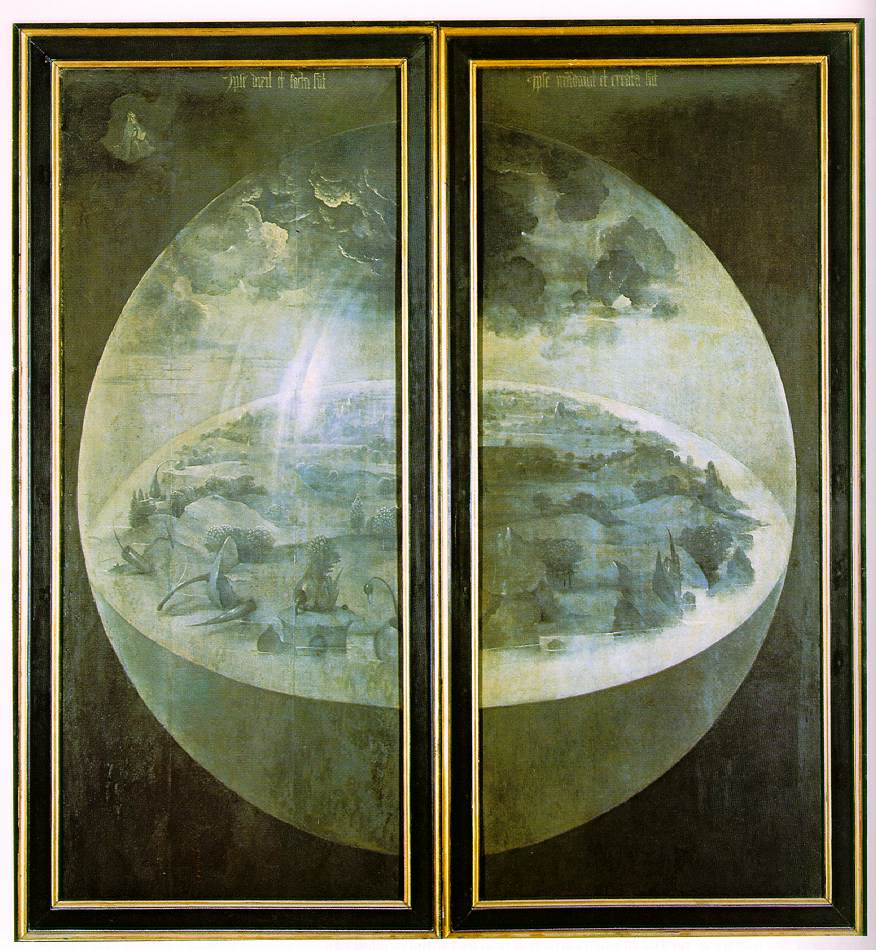
This image of The Garden of Earthly Delights illustrates the Hebrew Weltanschauung, which is reflected in the book of Genesis. The Earth is a disc surrounded by two water masses: the upper waters, which occasionally fall to Earth in form of rain when YHVH opens the floodgates of Heaven, and the lower waters, formed by the seas, the lakes and the Ocean. In the depths of the Cosmic Sphere lay the sheol, dwelling of the dead until the Judgement Day.

In this mappa mundi, the world is represented as a circular disc surrounded by the Ocean. However, despite the apparent depiction, the Beatus map is considered to illustrate a spherical globe, similar to a T-O map. The concept of a spherical Earth already became the dominant opinion in the Middle Ages. The Earth is divided in three continents: Asia (upper semicircle), Africa (right lower quadrant) and Europe (left lower quadrant), each of which belonged to the descendants of the three sons of Noah: Shem, Ham and Japheth. The continents are separated by water streams and inner seas, including the Mediterranean Sea (Europe-Africa), the River Nile (Africa-Asia), the Bosporus, and the Aegean Sea (Europe-Asia). In the center of the world lies Jerusalem, sacred to both Christianity and Judaism. This is where Abraham was about to sacrifice his own son, Isaac, and where the Passion and Resurrection of the Christ happened. The concept of Jerusalem as an umbilicus mundi was typical in medieval Christian theology. For example, in the Divine Comedy, Dante starts his journey to Hell from here.

== The description of the continents ==
=== Asia ===
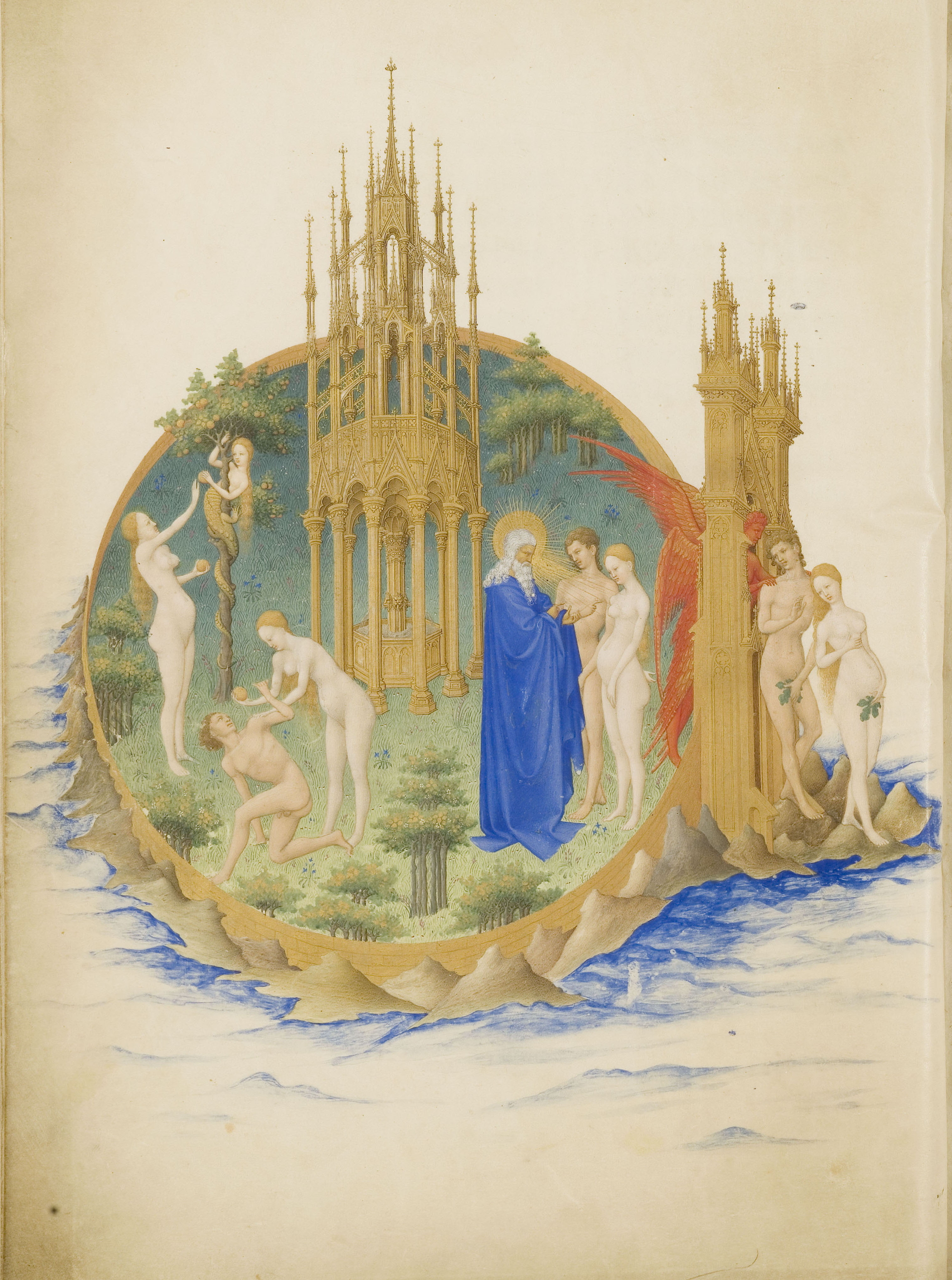
This illustration, from the calendar page of the book The Very Rich Hours of the Duke of Berry, shows Adam and Eve being expelled from the earthly Paradise. During the Middle Ages, it was believed that the Garden of Eden was located at the eastern end of the world, and it was possible, in theory, to reach it. Columbus attempted it.

At the eastern end of Asia lies the Garden of Eden, the earthly paradise where it is never cold nor hot, and where trees and wood of all kinds grow. In its center stands the Tree of Life, and next to it, a fountain from which the four rivers of Paradise: Tigris, Euphrates, Pishon and Gihon flow. The entrance to Paradise is protected by a Cherub, who brandishes a sword of fire.

On the south coast of the Asian continent is India, an enormous territory traversed by three rivers, the Indus, Ganges and Hipane. It has an abundance of dark-skinned people, elephants, rhinoceroses, spices, and precious stones, such as rubies, emeralds or diamonds. The fields are blessed by the west wind, Favonio, and for that reason they yield two harvests a year. There are the Mountains of Gold, access to which is denied to humans by griffins and dragons. Off the Indian coast are the islands of Taprobane (Sri Lanka, formerly Ceylon), abundant with gems and elephants, Chrysa and Argyre, rich in gold and silver, and Tyle, where trees never lose their leaves (it has been speculated that this is an island in Indonesia).

To the west of India one finds Parthia, a region that extends between the rivers Indus and Tigris. It is divided into five different provinces. Parthia proper, so called by the Parthians, brave soldiers from Scythia who founded an empire that was on an equal footing with Rome. Assyria, named after Asshur, the son of Shem, was famous for its purple dyes and all types of perfumes and ointments, where Nineveh, the capital of the old empire of the Assyrians is located, and where Jonas the prophet went to preach futilely. Medes (northwest Iran), which is divided in two parts, Greater Medes (Hamadan, Kermanshahan, Qazvin, Tehran and Espahan) and Smaller Medes (Azarbaijan). Finally there is Persia, birthplace of King Cyrus, the anointed one of God, and the region where magical science arose for the first time, introduced by Nebroth the giant, after the confusion of languages had emerged in Babel.

Map in the Las Huelgas Beatus

Mesopotamia is the region located between the rivers Tigris and Euphrates. There we find the regions of Babylon and Chaldea. Babylon was the ancient conqueror of the kingdom of Judah and the place where the Jewish people were exiled. In that city the revelations of the prophet Ezekiel took place, which had much influence on the creation of the Prophetic Chronicle. From Chaldea (South of Mesopotamia), the Asturian Chronicles supposed, came the hordes that invaded Spain and were defeated by Pelayo in Covadonga. The most important cities of this region include Ur, the birthplace of the patriarch Abraham, as well as Erech (or Uruk), which was founded by Enoch.

To the south of the River Euphrates, and Sinus Persicum (Persian Gulf), Arabia was located, a desert region whose southern part (present-day Yemen) received the name of Arabia Felix, Happy Arabia. It was a rich, fertile land where precious stones, myrrh and incense abounded. In it lived the fabulous Phoenix, a bird, which after dying surrounded by fire, was reborn of its ashes. On the northeast border of Arabia, already in territories of the old Roman Empire, extended the province of Syria, whose limits were the Caucasus and Taurus Mountains to the north, the River Euphrates to the east, the Mediterranean Sea and Egypt to the west, and Arabia to the south. Syria had three different provinces: Comagena, Phoenicia, and Palestine. The territory of Phoenicia extended from the Mediterranean Sea to Mount Lebanon and the sea of Tiberiades. Phoenicia contained the famous cities of Sidon and Tyre. In the latter they believed the prophet Elias was Jesus Christ. Further south was Palestine, which was subdivided into four different provinces: Galilee, where they crucified Jesus of Nazareth, the Sea of Tiberiades, where many of the apostles worked as fishermen, and Monte Tabor, the place where the Transfiguration occurred.

=== Africa ===
Africa is obviously from the Nile river with a lake as its source. The Maghreb is named "Libia" and Africa is surrounded by a sea coloured red.
