= Sisnando Menéndez =

Spanish bishop

Sisnando Menéndez was a bishop of Iria Flavia in Galicia, known as Sisnando II, from 952–968.

== Background ==
He appears to have been killed in a Viking raid. He was the son of Hermenegildo Alóitez and his successor was Pelayo Rodríguez.
