= Gunrod =

Viking warlord from Norway

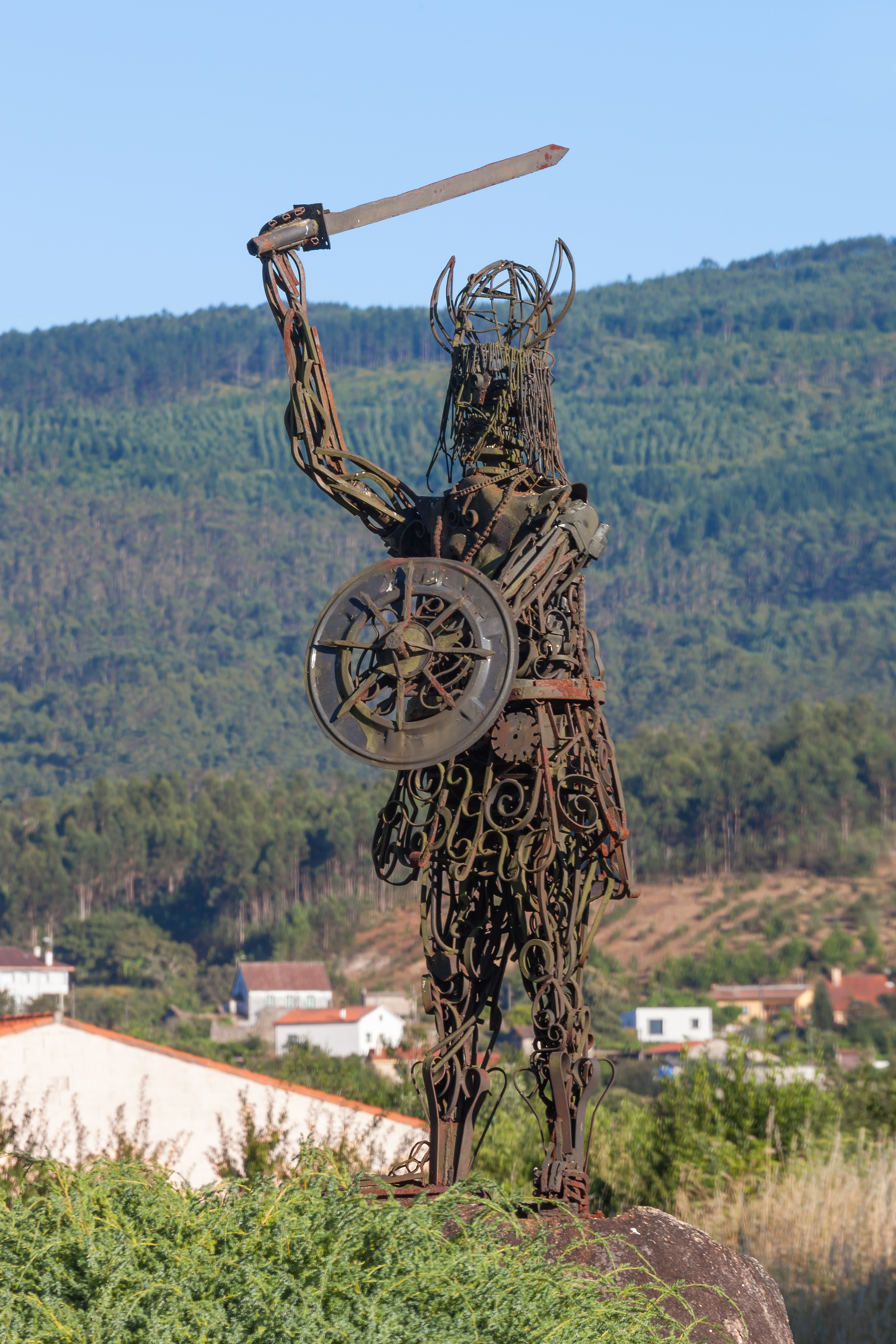
Statue in Catoira, Galicia, commemorating the Viking invasions.

Gundered (Spanish: Gunderedo; putatively Old Norse: Guðrǫðr; sometimes rendered Gunrod or Gunrød) was a Viking warlord, known only from a group of twelfth-century Spanish Latin Chronicles all of which derive from the lost eleventh-century Chronicle of Sampiro: the Historia Silense, the Liber chronicorum of Pelayo of Oviedo

and Chronica Naierense. In the account of the Historia Silense:

In the second year of his reign (Ramiro III, i.e. 968) one hundred ships of Vikings (Normani) with their king Gundered penetrated the cities of Galicia and with much slaughter in the lands of Santiago, whose bishop Sisnando perished by the sword. They sacked all Galicia as far as the Pirineos montes Ezebrarii. In the third year of their settlement, God, from whom nothing is hidden, brought down his vengeance upon them; for just as they had carried the Christians away captive and put many to the sword, so many ills fell upon them, until they were forced to go out from Galicia. Count Guillelmus Sánchez, in the name of the Lord, and with the aid of the Apostle Santiago whose lands they had devastated, went out with a great army and with divine aid killed all the pagans, including their king, and burned their ships.

None of the people mentioned here, nor the precise places, can be certainly identified apart from Bishop Sisnando Menéndez, though Guillelmus Sánchez might be identifiable as an obscure Galician count of Visigothic descent, Gonzalo Sánchez, or as William Sánchez of Gascony.

This has not prevented speculation about Gundered's identity. Suggestions include that he was one of two sons of the (possibly fictitious) Norwegian king Haraldr inn hárfagri named Guðrøðr in the thirteenth-century Icelandic Heimskringla; or that he was a "Sea-King" (sækonungr), possibly a cousin or brother of Harald II of Norway.

Gunderid was killed at the battle of Cenbreiro in 971.

== See also ==
- Vikings in Iberia

== Sources ==
- Forte, Oram, and Pedersen (2005), Viking Empires, p. 60
- Velasco, Manuel (2008) Breve Historia de los Vikingos, p. 175
- Eduardo Morales Romero (1997) (en gallego). Os vikingos en Galicia. La Coruña.
- A. Fabricius, Forbindelserne mellem Norden og den Spanske Halvø i ældre Tider, Copenhague, 1882.
- Eduardo Morales Romero: Los vikingos en España. Revista Historia de Iberia Vieja, n.º 12, Madrid: HRH * Editores, 2006.
- Rolf Scheen, Viking raids on the spanish peninsula, 2006
