= List of Bienes de Interés Cultural in Cantabria =

This is an incomplete list of Bien de Interés Cultural landmarks in Cantabria, Spain.

- Bárcena Mayor
- Cargadero de Dícido
- Church of Santa María (Lebeña)
- Colegiata y Claustro de Santa Juliana
- Collegiate church of San Martin de Elines, Cantabria
- Collegiate church of San Pedro de Cervatos
- Comillas Pontifical University
- El Capricho
- Juliobriga
- Mogrovejo
- Palacio de la Magdalena
- Royal Artillery Factory of La Cavada
- Santa Olaja mill
- Santander Cathedral
- Santo Toribio de Liébana
