= Turibius =

Turibius or Toribius (Spanish: Toribio) is the name of several saints:

- Turibius of Astorga (died 460), Spanish bishop
- Turibius of Liébana (fl. c. 527), Spanish monk
- Turibius of Mogrovejo (died 1606), Spanish nobleman, Grand Inquisitor, missionary, archbishop and saint

== See also ==
- Toribio (disambiguation)
