= Northern Way =

Pilgrims' way from Irún to Santiago de Compostela

- Camino del Norte (Spanish); Camiño do Norte (Galician); Iparraldeko bidea (Basque)
- Map of the Northern Way
- Interactive map of Northern Way
- Type: Pilgrims' way
- Location: From Irún to Santiago de Compostela

UNESCO World Heritage Site
- Criteria: Cultural: (ii), (iv), (vi)
- Designated: 1993 (17th session)
- Part of: Routes of Santiago de Compostela: Camino Francés and Routes of Northern Spain
- Reference no.: 669bis-002

The Northern Way (Spanish: Camino del Norte, Galician: Camiño do Norte, Basque: Iparraldeko bidea), also called the Coastal Way (Spanish: Camino de la Costa, Galician: Camiño da Costa, Basque: Kostaldeko bidea), is one of the routes of the Camino de Santiago. It is an 817 kilometres (508 mi), five-week coastal route from Irún (Gipuzkoa), near the border with France, following the northern coastline of Spain into Galicia where it heads inland towards Santiago de Compostela joining the French Way at Arzúa (A Coruña). (Note: Some dedicated apps for pilgrims show the start of this route already in Bayonne.) This route follows the old Roman road, the Via Agrippa –which was used in the Middle Ages by Christian pilgrims when Muslim domination had extended northwards and was making travel along the French Way dangerous – for some of its way. The Northern Way coincides with the E9 European long distance path for most of its route.

== Background ==
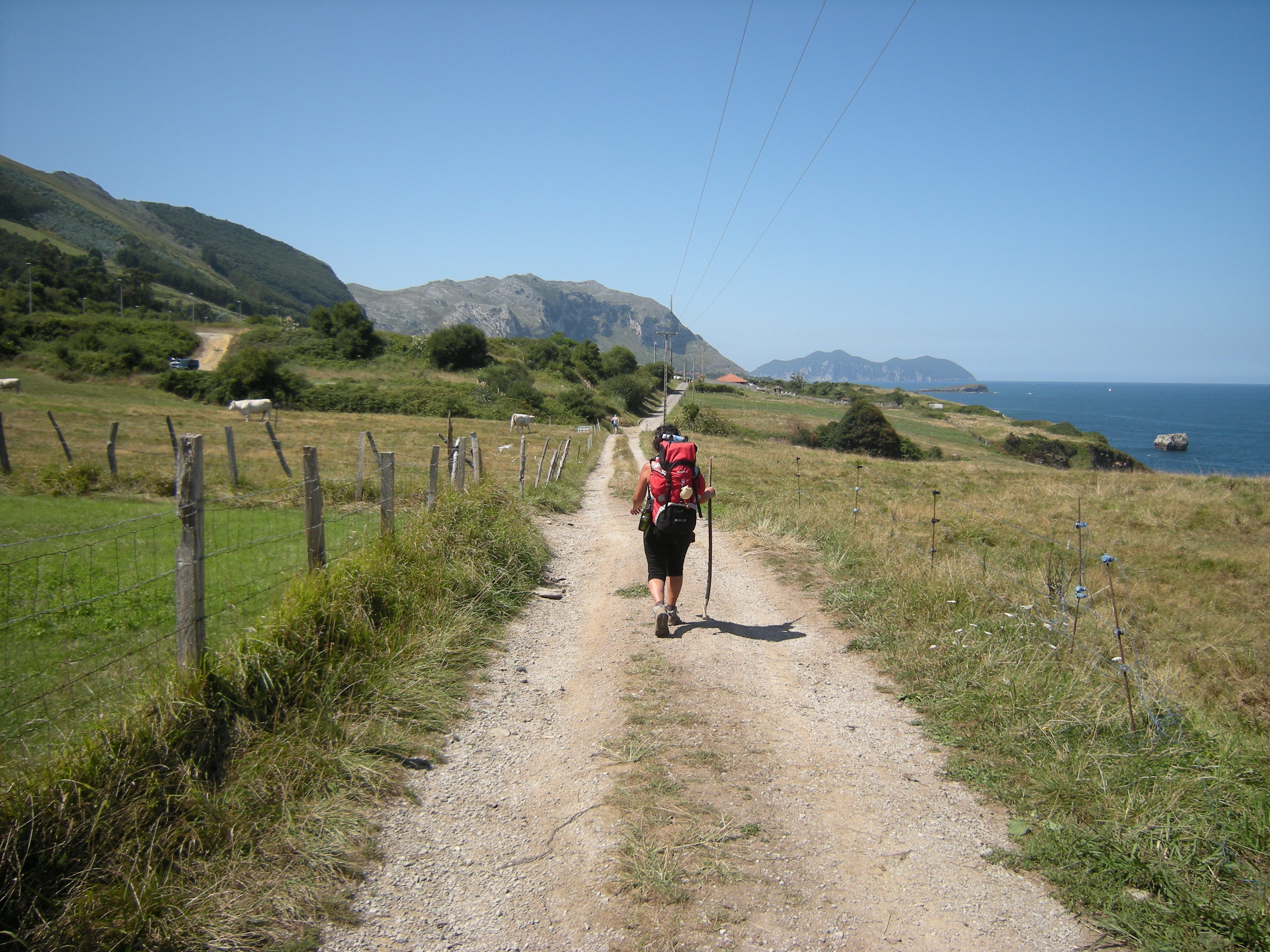
The Way in Castro-Urdiales (Cantabria)

The route passes through San Sebastián, Guernica (Biscay), Bilbao, Santander, and Gijón (Asturias). It is less known and less traveled than the French Way, and harder to walk because of the elevation changes. Shelters are farther apart, 20–35 kilometres (12–22 mi), than the hostels (Spanish: albergues) or monasteries every 4–10 kilometres (2.5–6.2 mi) on the French Way. The route's proximity to the sea makes it much cooler than the French Way in the summer.

A start in Vilalba (Lugo), 116 km (72 mi) away from Santiago de Compostela, makes the pilgrims eligible for the certificate of accomplishment.

The Liébana Way links the Northern Way with the French Way passing by the Monastery of Santo Toribio de Liébana in Cantabria.

== Statistics ==
In 2024, the Northern Way was the sixth most popular route of the Camino de Santiago. 21,400 pilgrims finished it. Most pilgrims were Spanish (42%), followed by Germans (7.7%), Americans (7.5%), Italians, and French (both 6%). The most popular starting points of the pilgrims who got the certificate were Irun (30%), Vilalba (10.6%), Ribadeo (9.6%), and Bilbao (6.2%). Most pilgrims finished this route in July and August. 11.2% of the pilgrims who got the certificate did the journey by bike.

== See also ==
- Camino a Santiago Vía Aquitania
- Buiza
