= Toribío =

Toribio or Toribío may refer to:

== Places ==
- Toribío, Cauca, a town in Cauca Department, Colombia
- Santo Toribio de Liébana, a Roman Catholic monastery in Cantabria, Spain
- Santo Toribio District, a district in the Ancash Region of Peru
- Toribio Casanova District, a district in Cutervo, Peru

== People ==
=== Saints ===
- Toribio Romo González (1900–1928), a Mexican saint
- Turibius of Mongrovejo (1538–1606), Archbishop of Lima, Peru, from 1579 to 1606

=== Athletes ===
- Daniel Toribio (born 5 October 1988), a Spanish footballer
- Simeon Toribio (September 3, 1905 – June 5, 1969), Olympic athlete from the Philippines
- Manuel Ortiz Toribio (born August 22, 1984), Spanish footballer

=== Other people ===
- Toribio de Benavente Motolinia (1482–1568), a Franciscan missionary in Mexico
- Toribio Rodríguez de Mendoza (1750–1825), a Peruvian academic
- Celines Toribio, a Spanish actress
- René Toribio (1912–1990), a Guadeloupean politician
- Toribio Terán, president of Nicaragua, January to March 1849

== See also ==
- Turibius (disambiguation)
