= Routes of Santiago de Compostela: Camino Francés and Routes of Northern Spain =

UNESCO World Heritage Site in Spain

Routes of Santiago de Compostela: Camino Francés and Routes in Northern Spain
UNESCO World Heritage Site
- Jacobean Northern routes.

- Location within Spain Location within Europe
- Location: Spain
- Includes: 5 routes and 16 structures
- Criteria: Cultural: (ii), (iv), (vi)
- Reference: 669bis
- Inscription: 1993 (17th Session)
- Extensions: 2015
- Area: 16,286 ha (40,240 acres)
- Coordinates: 43°20′6″N 6°24′53″W

The Routes of Santiago de Compostela: Camino Francés and Routes of Northern Spain is a UNESCO World Heritage Site located in Spain. It was designated in 1993, and later expanded and renamed in 2015. The complete site includes a network of five traditional pilgrimage routes of the Way of Saint James as it passes through Northern Spain: the popular French Way, the Primitive Way, the Northern or Coastal Way, the Interior Way and the Liébana Route; as well as 16 of the most "culturally significant" individual structures, including religious and civil buildings.

In 1998, UNESCO also designated as World Heritage Site the routes located in France. The old town of Santiago de Compostela and its cathedral, the final destination of these routes, is also a World Heritage site, although separate from this one. It was inscribed in 1985.

== The Way of Saint James ==
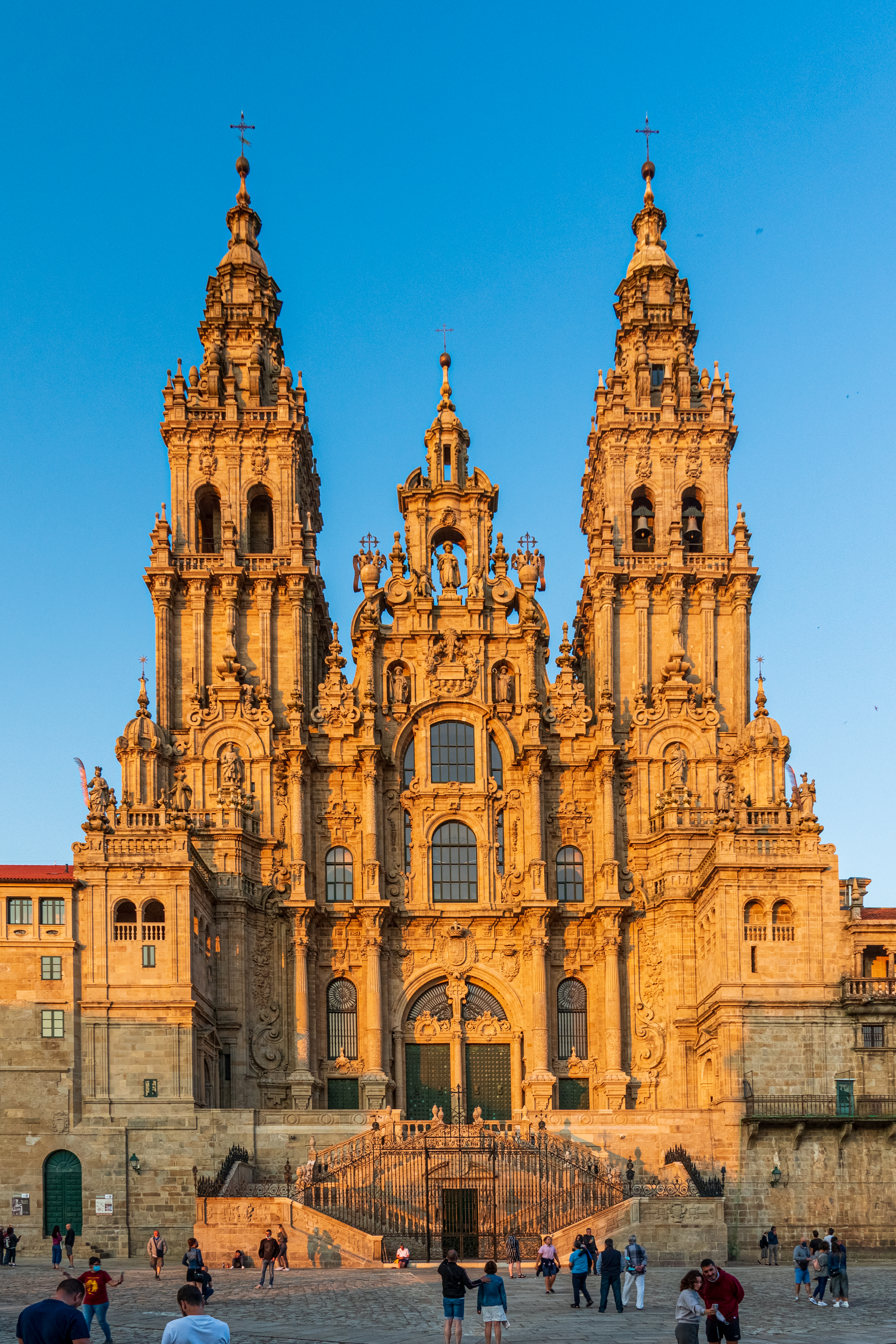
The Cathedral of Saint James.

The Way of Saint James, also known as Camino de Santiago after its Spanish language name, is a network of pilgrims' ways or pilgrimages leading to the shrine of the apostle Saint James the Great in the cathedral of Santiago de Compostela in Galicia in northwestern Spain, where tradition holds that the remains of the apostle are buried.

Created and established after the discovery of the relics of Saint James the Great at the beginning of the 9th century, the Way of Saint James became a major pilgrimage route of medieval Christianity from the 10th century onwards. But it was only after the liberation of Granada in 1492, under the reign of Ferdinand II of Aragon and Isabella I of Castile, that Pope Alexander VI officially declared the Camino de Santiago to be one of the "three great pilgrimages of Christendom", along with Jerusalem and the Via Francigena to Rome.

Today, many still follow its routes as a spiritual path or retreat for their spiritual growth. It is also popular with hikers, cyclers, and organized tour groups.

== Routes ==
=== French Way ===
The French Way is the most well-known and used of the Spanish routes. Measuring 738 km, from the northeastern border with France to Santiago de Compostela. It is the continuation of four routes in France (hence the name) that merge into two after crossing the Pyrenees into Spain at Roncesvalles (Valcarlos Pass) and Canfranc (Somport Pass) and then converge at Puente la Reina south of Pamplona.

The French Route passes through five Autonomous Communities (Aragón, Navarre, La Rioja, Castile and León, and Galicia) and 166 towns and villages. This is the first property to be inscribed as World Heritage Site in 1993, and originally listed almost 2000 associated buildings and structures of historic relevance, including religious buildings, hostels to assist pilgrims, bridges, locks, and commemorative crosses. These range in date from the 11th century to almost the present day.

=== Northern Way ===
The Northern or Coastal Way begins in the Bidasoa basin, a river that serves as the border with France at the Atlantic Ocean. It then follows westward along the coast of the Bay of Biscay, reaching the Basque cities of Irún, Donostia-San Sebastian, Bilbao, as well as Santander in Cantabria, and Gijón in Asturias, a total distance of over 930 km. The route is believed to first have been used by pilgrims to avoid traveling through the territories occupied by Muslims in the Middle Ages. The southward expansion of the Christian kingdoms since the 11th century led to decline of the Northern routes in favour of the French route, which is flatter and much easier to traverse. The remaining routes branch off this route, they are listed below from East to West.

=== Interior Way ===
The Interior Way, also called The Basque Way. In the Early Middle Ages, when the Northern (Coastal) Way was subject to the Vikings' skirmishes and Muslim presence and forays threatened pilgrims and trade routes in the borderlands, the Interior Way provided a safe road north of the frontier area. From the starting point in Irún, the road heads south-west up the Oria valley, reaches its highest point at the San Adrian tunnel and runs through the Alavan plains to Santo Domingo de la Calzada, where it connects with the French Way, totalling under 200 km in length.

=== Liébana Route ===
The Liébana Route is the shortest of the listed routes, a little over 55 km long. It provides access to the Santo Toribio de Liébana Monastery, itself a Catholic pilgrimage site.

=== Primitive Way ===
The Primitive or Original Way, is the oldest route to Santiago de Compostela, traditionally first taken in the 9th century. It branches off the Northern Way just east of Gijón, and passes through Oviedo and Lugo, with a total length of 311 km.

== List of Locations ==
This is a list of the locations included in the 2015 extension of the site:

ID	Name	Location	Autonomous Community	Property Area	Buffer Area	Images
669bis-001	Primitive Way	–	Asturias; Galicia	–	1,903.55 ha	
669bis-002	Northern Way	–	Asturias; Basque Country; Cantabria	–	5,723.87 ha	
669bis-003	Interior Way	–	Basque Country; La Rioja	–	1,187.43 ha	
669bis-004	Liébana Way	–	Cantabria	–	330.44 ha	
669bis-005	Cathedral Basilica of the Holy Saviour and its Holy Chamber	Oviedo	Asturias	0.66 ha	11.94 ha	
669bis-006	Church and Monastery of the Holy Saviour	Cornellana	Asturias	0.56 ha	3.97 ha	
669bis-007	Cathedral of the Assumption of Saint Mary	Lugo	Galicia	0.5 ha	2.6 ha	
669bis-008	Roman walls of Lugo	Lugo	Galicia	1.78 ha	44.15 ha	
669bis-009	Collegiate of Saint Mary	Ziortza	Basque Country	0.22 ha	1.41 ha	
669bis-010	Cathedral Basilica of Saint James the Apostle	Bilbao	Basque Country	0.31 ha	1.07 ha	
669bis-011	Church of Saint Mary of the Assumption	Castro-Urdiales	Cantabria	0.13 ha	0.33 ha	
669bis-012	Collegiate of Saint Juliana and its cloister	Santillana del Mar	Cantabria	0.25 ha	0.14 ha	
669bis-013	Church of San Salvador	Priesca	Asturias	0.03 ha	–	
669bis-014	Church of Saint Martin	San Martín de Luiña	Asturias	0.06 ha	3.46 ha	
669bis-015	Cathedral Basilica of the Virgin of the Assumption	Mondoñedo	Galicia	0.29 ha	3.1 ha	
669bis-016	Monastery of Saint Mary of the Monks	Sobrado	Galicia	6.71 ha	37.16 ha	
669bis-017	Causeway and tunnel of Saint Adrian	–	Basque Country	2.53 ha	23.05 ha	
669bis-018	Cathedral of Saint Mary	Vitoria-Gasteiz	Basque Country	0.25 ha	2.69 ha	
669bis-019	Briñas Bridge	Haro	La Rioja	0.1 ha	0.92 ha	
669bis-020	Monastery of Saint Turibius	Liébana	Cantabria	0.2 ha	0.29 ha	
