= Cathedral of Santa María de Vitoria =

Cathedral in Vitoria-Gasteiz, Spain

- Catedral de Santa María (Spanish) Santa Maria katedrala (Basque)
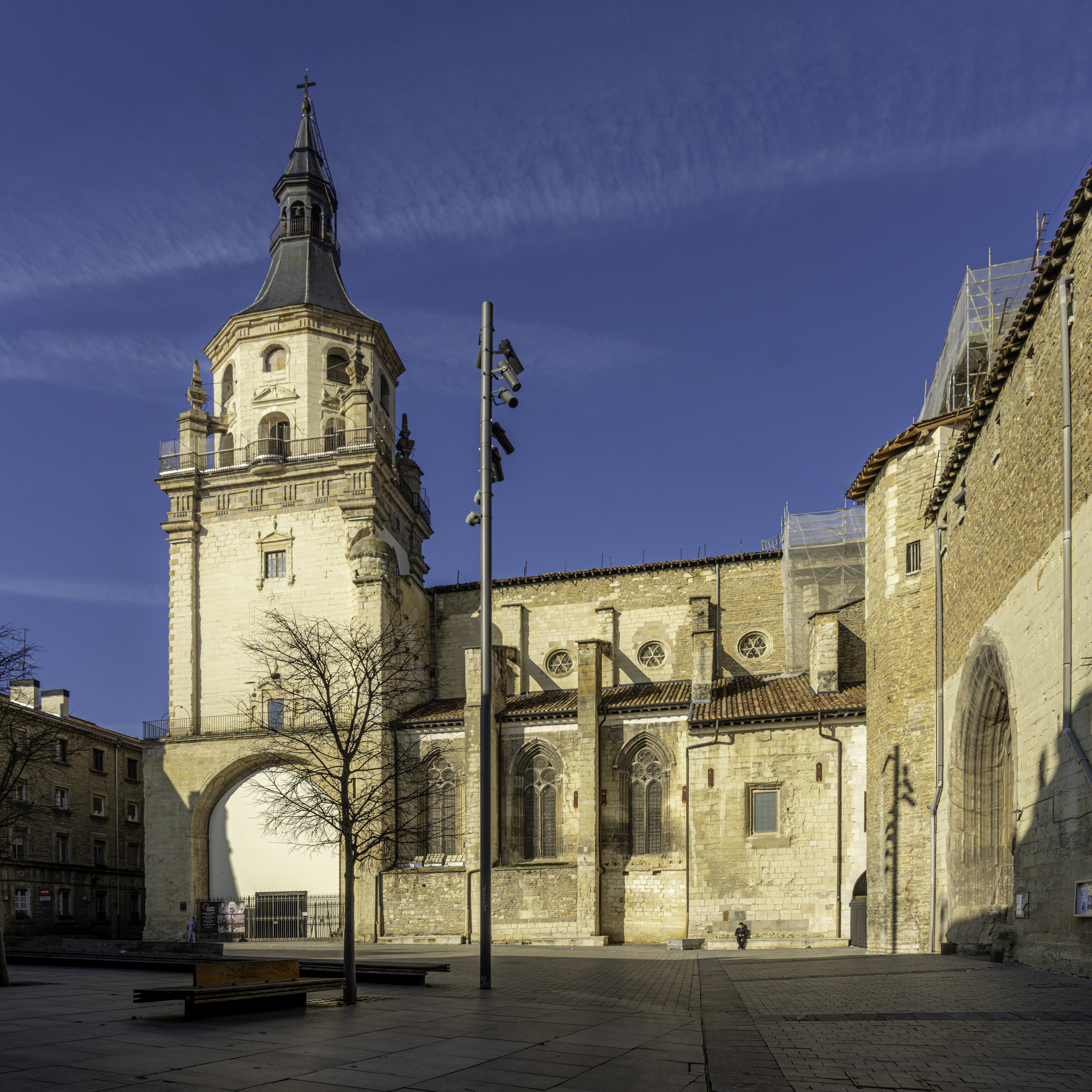
- View from the Plaza de Santa María
- Cathedral of Santa María de Vitoria
- 42.850689°N 2.672431°W
- Location: Vitoria-Gasteiz, Álava, Basque Country
- Country: Spain
- Denomination: Catholic Church
- Tradition: Latin Church

History
- Status: Cathedral, minor basilica

Architecture
- Style: Gothic

Administration
- Archdiocese: Archidiocese of Burgos
- Diocese: Diocese of Vitoria

UNESCO World Heritage Site
- Type: Cultural
- Criteria: ii, iv, vi
- Designated: 2015
- Part of: Routes of Santiago de Compostela: Camino Francés and Routes of Northern Spain
- Reference no.: 669bis-018
- Region: Europe and North America

Spanish Cultural Heritage
- Official name: Iglesia Catedral de Santa María
- Type: Non-movable
- Criteria: Monument
- Designated: 1931
- Reference no.: RI-51-0000359

The Cathedral of Santa María de Vitoria (Basque: Santa Maria katedrala, Spanish: Catedral de Santa María) is a Gothic-style, Roman Catholic cathedral located in Vitoria-Gasteiz, Basque country, Spain. It was declared Bien de Interés Cultural in 1931 and a World Heritage Site (as part of the Camino de Santiago) in 2015.

== History ==
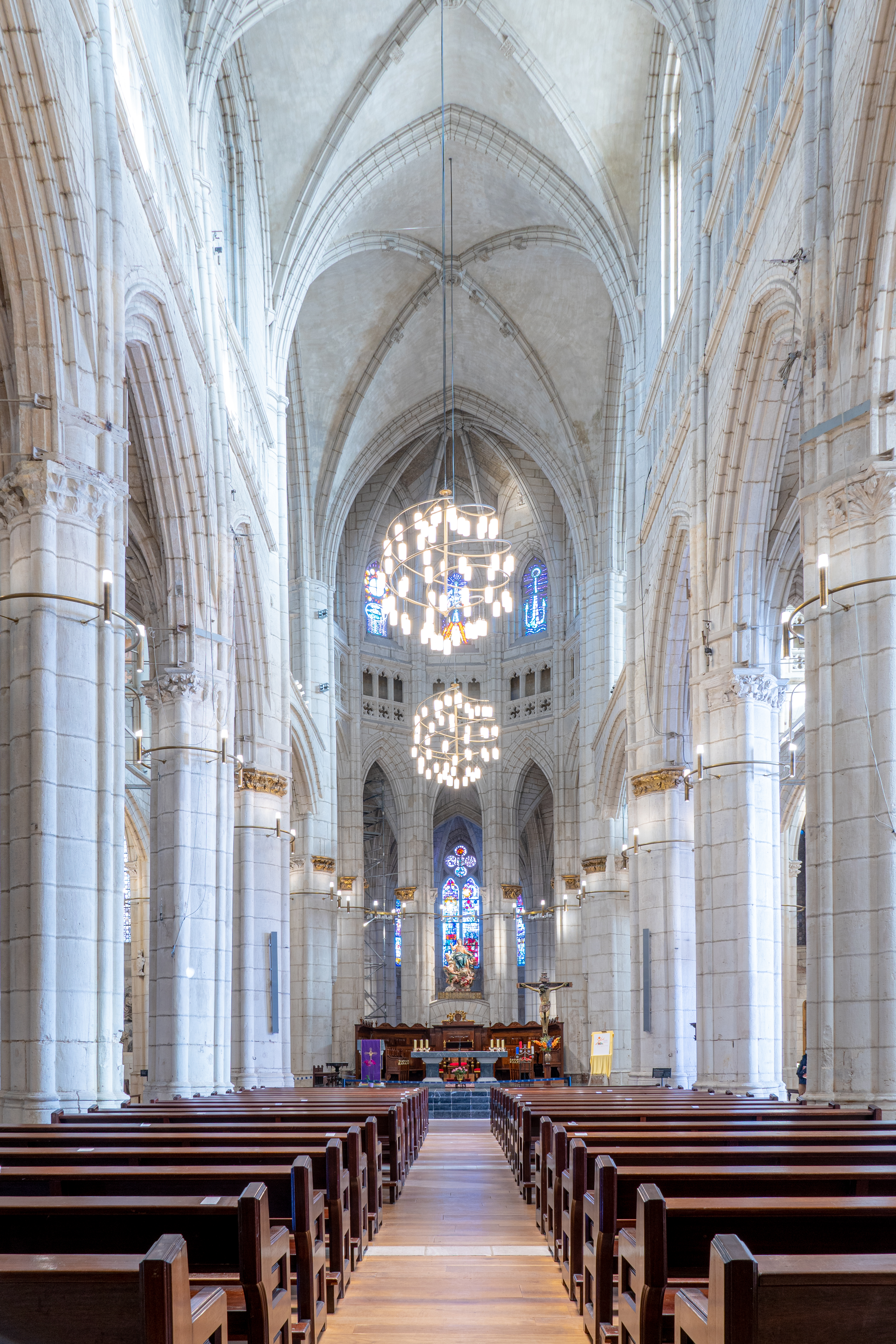
Main nave and altar in 2021, after extensive restoration works

Construction of the cathedral of Santa María in Gothic-style began in the late 13th century and continued throughout the 14th century. It was conceived as a fortress church, with great volume and enclosed appearance, being part of the city's defences.

Between 1496 and 1861, the building operated as a collegiate church, and it was that year when it was declared a cathedral. It has a Latin-cross plan, with a wide transept crossing and circular apse containing several chapels.

The facade's portals are richly decorated with sculpture. The western portico is masterwork consisting of three portals: the central one consecrated to the Virgin, the left one dedicated to San Gil and the right one to the Final Judgement and Saint James.

The cathedral closed down to the public in 1994 after a partial collapse of a vault and major structural damages were found. It is being restored since then within the project of the Santa Maria Cathedral Foundation, which manages guided tours and is in charge of restoration works.
