= Collegiate church and cloister of St Juliana =

Colegiata y Claustro de Santa Juliana
- Colegiata y Claustro de Santa Juliana (Spanish)
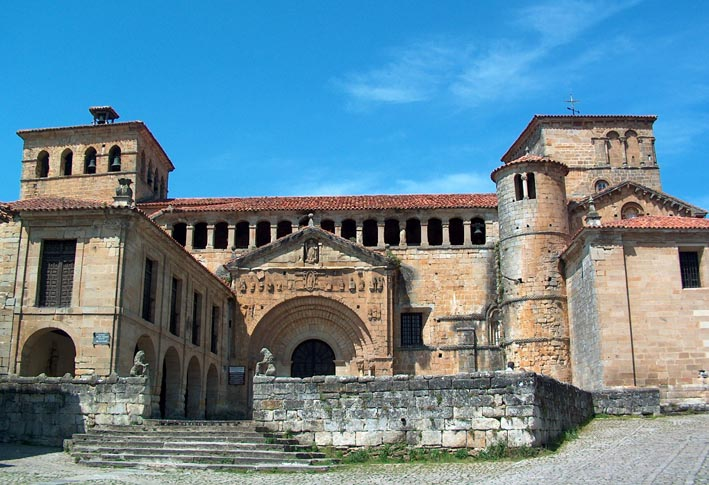

- Location within Spain
- 43.392217°N 4.106006°W
- Location: Santillana del Mar, Spain

UNESCO World Heritage Site
- Type: Cultural
- Criteria: ii, iv, vi
- Designated: 1993 (17th session)
- Part of: Routes of Santiago de Compostela: Camino Francés and Routes of Northern Spain
- Reference no.: 669bis-012
- Region: Europe and North America

Spanish Cultural Heritage
- Official name: Colegiata y Claustro de Santa Juliana
- Type: Non-movable
- Criteria: Monument
- Designated: 12 March 1889
- Reference no.: RI-51-0000057

The Collegiate church and cloister of Santa Juliana (Spanish: Colegiata y Claustro de Santa Juliana) is a collegiate church located in Santillana del Mar, Spain. The church is dedicated to Juliana of Nicomedia.

It is notable as an example of Romanesque architecture

== Conservation ==
It has been part of a World Heritage Site since 2015, when the Camino de Santiago (a serial site first designated in 1993) was expanded to take in more variants of the pilgrimage route. The sites included in the UNESCO designation are largely monuments, churches, or hospitals that provided services to pilgrims headed to Santiago de Compostela.

It is also protected as a Bien de Interés Cultural; it was first given a heritage listing in 1889.

== See also ==
- List of Bien de Interés Cultural in Cantabria
