= Church of Santa María (Lebeña) =

Pre-romanesque church in north of Spain

- Iglesia de Santa María (Lebeña) (Spanish)
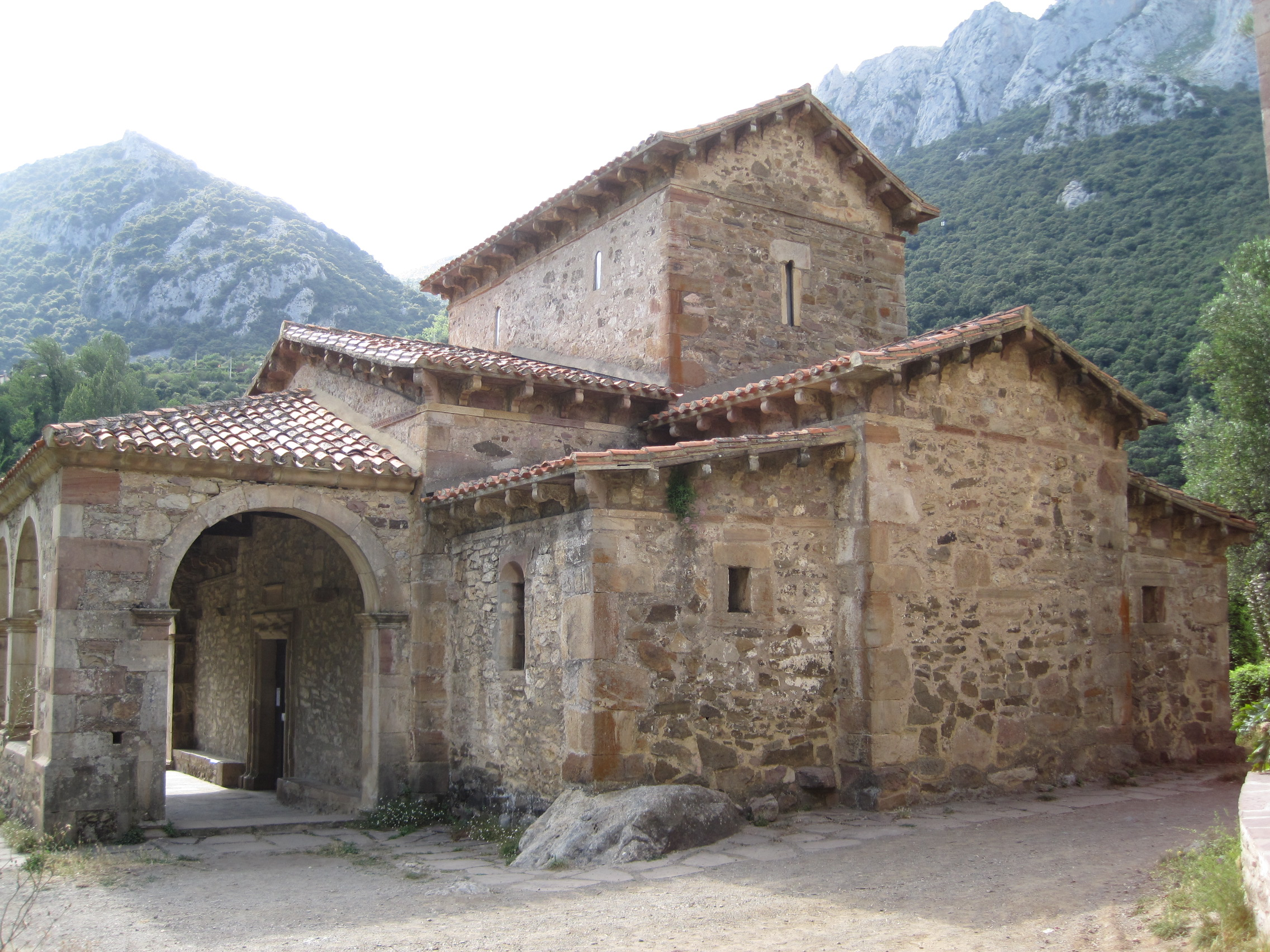

- Location within Spain
- 43.215528°N 4.590417°W
- Location: Cillorigo de Liébana, Spain

Spanish Cultural Heritage
- Official name: Iglesia de Santa María (Lebeña)
- Type: Non-movable
- Criteria: Monument
- Designated: 1893
- Reference no.: RI-51-0000064

The Church of Santa María (Lebeña) (Spanish: Iglesia de Santa María (Lebeña)) is a medieval building located in Cillorigo de Liébana, Spain. The architectural style is Pre-Romanesque.

== Conservation ==
It is classed as a Bien de Interés Cultural and has been protected since 1893.

== See also ==
- List of Bien de Interés Cultural in Cantabria
