= Cargadero de Dícido =

Historic site in Spain

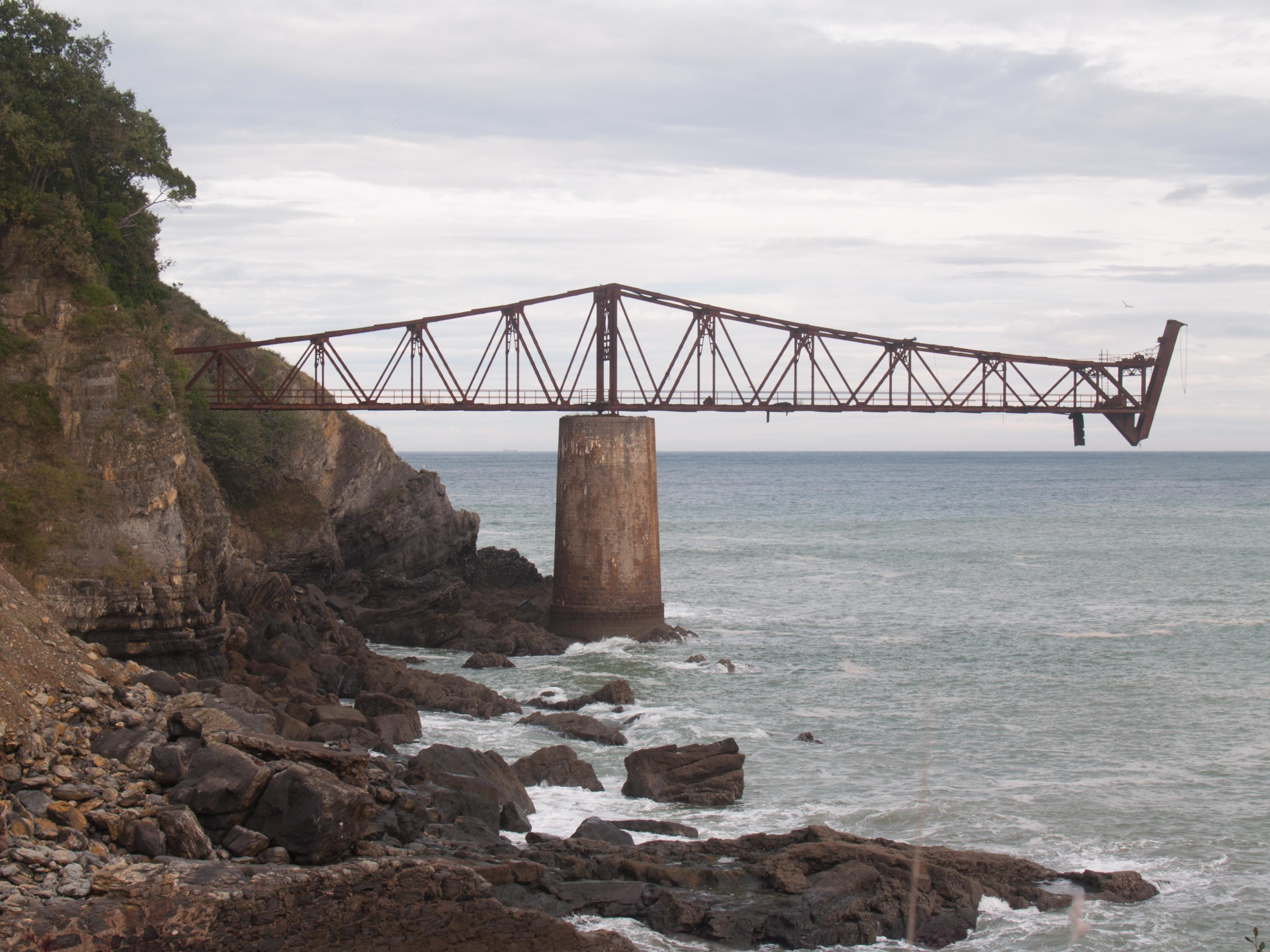
- Interactive map of Cargadero de Dícido
- Location: Castro Urdiales, Cantabria, Spain
- Built: 1938

The Cargadero de Dícido or Cargadero de Mineral de Mioño is a historic mineral loader (cargadero) located in the town of Mioño, in Castro Urdiales, Cantabria, Spain. It has been declared a Cultural Interest Asset.

== History ==
It gave service to the nearby Dícido mines, which are now abandoned. The first Dícido loading dock was built in 1880 by M.T. Seiring, partner of Gustave Eiffel. It was destroyed in 1937 during the Spanish Civil War, and was replaced by the current structure in 1938. It was designed by the Compañía Anónima Basconia and Gortazar Hermanos and built by Altos Hornos de Vizcaya.

It was declared a Cultural Interest Asset in 1996.

== Description ==
It is composed of a large circular section pillar, made of dimension stone, supporting a cantilevered iron structure.
