= Turibius of Liébana =

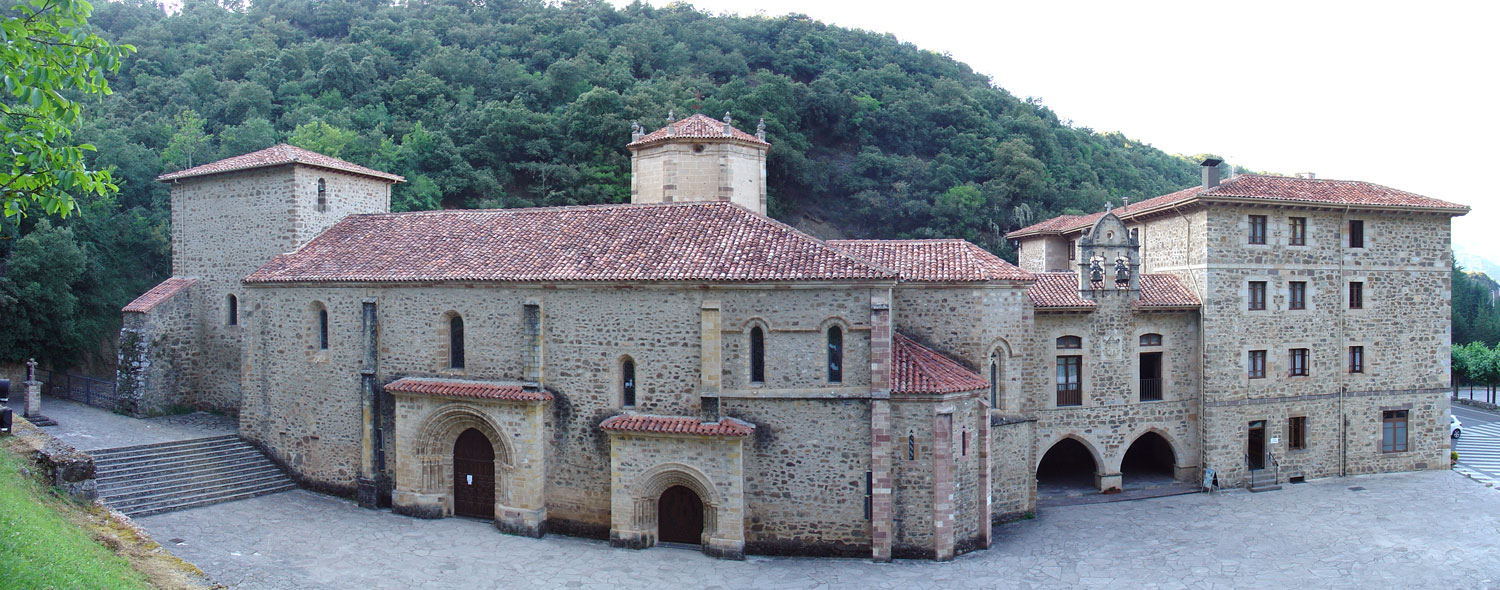
Monastery founded by Turibius at Liébana

Turibius of Liébana (fl. c. 530), also known as Turbius the Monk (Turibius Monachus, Toribio el Monje), was an early Benedictine monk. He was born probably in Turieno and spent most of his life in the region of Liébana. He received a letter full of praise from Bishop Montanus of Toledo in 527. In his preaching, he condemned as heresy the Priscillianism still rampant in Spain. Around the middle of the century, he and five companions took up the Benedictine habit and founded the monastery of Liébana, either the second or third oldest Benedictine establishment in Spain, dedicating it to Martin of Tours.

Turibius of Liébana has been conflated with Turibius of Astorga (died 460), also a saint, whose bones came to rest in the monastery the former Turibius had founded and where he also was buried.

According to the Chronicon attributed to Hauberto, a Benedictine Mozarab of the reign of Alfonso III of Asturias, but actually a forgery by Antonio Lupian Zapata, Turibius became Bishop of Palencia in 533. He was also said to have translated the body of Antoninus of Pamiers to the Cathedral of Palencia, thereafter named in his honour.

His feast day is 11 November, or 16 April in other calendars.
