= Santa Olaja mill =

Coordinates: 43.4861°N 3.5494°W

- Molino de Santa Olaja (Spanish)
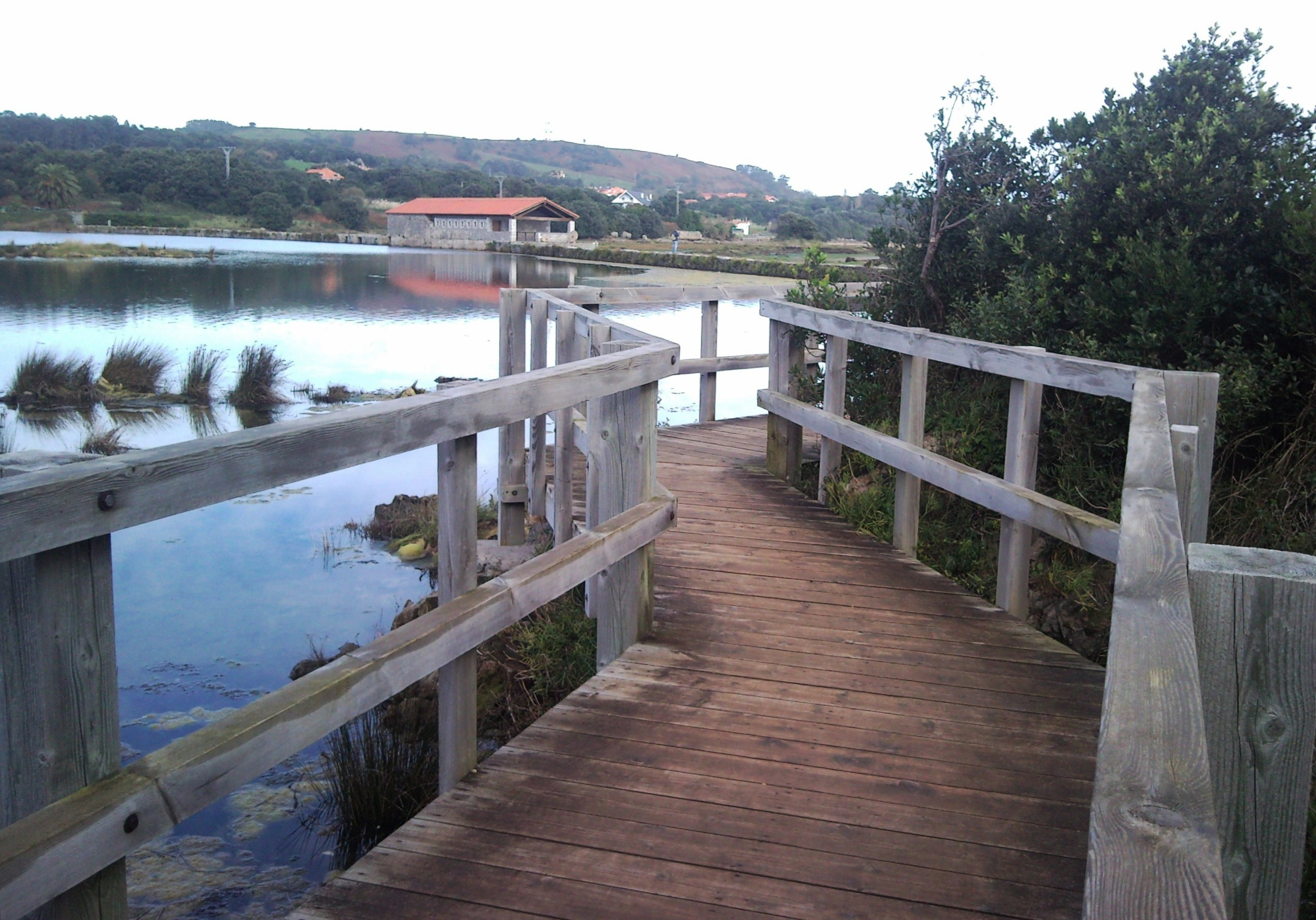
- Soana Marshes with the Santo Olaja tide mill in the background

- Location within Spain
- Location: Arnuero, Cantabria, Spain

Site notes
- Area: 300 square metres (3,200 sq ft)

Spanish Cultural Heritage
- Official name: Molino de Santa Olaja
- Type: Non-movable
- Criteria: Monument
- Designated: 1988
- Reference no.: A.R.I. 51 - 0005373 - 00000

The Santa Olaja mill is located in the Joyel Marshes in Soano, in the municipality of Arnuero in the autonomous community of Cantabria, Spain. It was declared a Bien de Interés Cultural in November 2013.

== History ==
The Santa Olaja mill is a tide mill. It is one of the main attractions within the Trasmiera Ecopark, a park which was voted an EDEN destination winner in 2011. The mill was constructed in the fourteenth century and remained operational until 1953. It had ten 10 wheels which gives an idea of its importance. This building is a very distinctive example of sea or tidal mills, hydraulic devices prototypical of the Renaissance technological culture in Cantabria. Its operation consists of storing water during high tide in a natural reservoir enclosed by dams, which is later used to activate the other mechanisms.

The mill's exact chronology is unknown. It was rebuilt in 1695. The tide mills are a variant of flour mills that take advantage of the variations in sea level, caused by the action of tides, for grinding grain. The Santa Olaja mill, about 300 square metres (3,200 sq ft), consists of two buildings joined by a dividing wall.

Wheel of the Santa Olaja mill in operation

It is built in stone masonry with ashlar in the corner posts. The seaward side has six semicircular arches and the inverse side has buttresses or embankments. The building was renovated in 2002. Its facilities, converted into a museum, serve to explain the operation of this type of mill, the different jobs that were performed there and its role in the economy of the time. The Santa Olaja mill represents what has long been the traditional way of life in this region.

The interior of the building is divided into two parts. A porch leads to a room where all the machinery of one wheel and parts of three others has been rebuilt. On display in the building are various instruments used during the grinding process as well as several stones with the radial slots used in the grinding of grain and flour. The adjoining room, has a partially glazed floor.
