= Turibius of Astorga =

Saint Turibius of Astorga
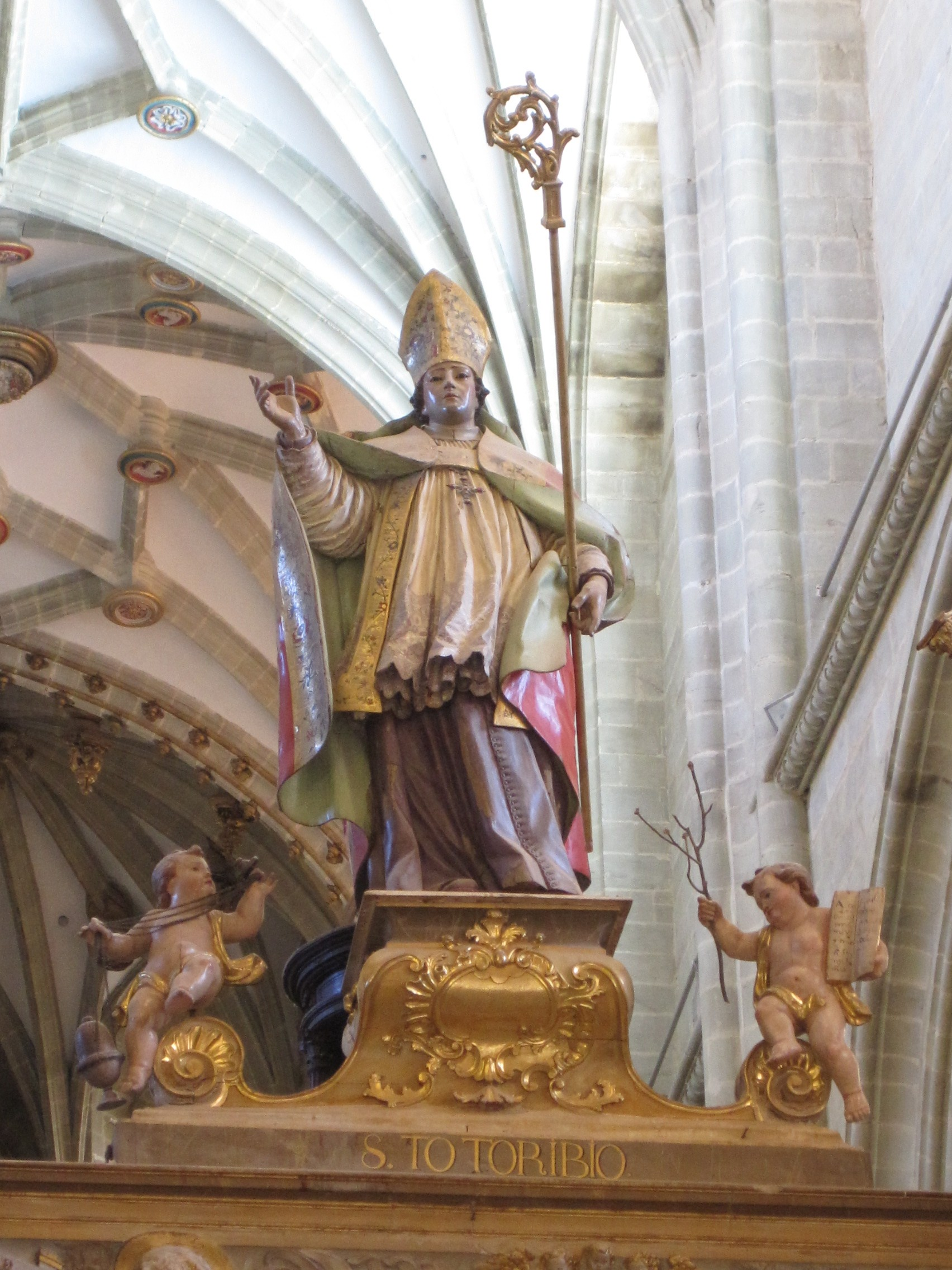
- Statue of Saint Turibius, Cathedral of Astorga.

Bishop
- Died: 460 AD
- Major shrine: Cathedral of Astorga
- Feast: April 16
- Attributes: mitre

Saint Turibius of Astorga (Spanish: Santo Toribio de Astorga; fl. 446, died 460) was an archdeacon of Tui and an early Bishop of Astorga. Turibius was a zealous maintainer of ecclesiastical discipline, and defender of the Nicene Christianity against the Galician heresy of Priscillianism, for which he received a supportive letter from Leo the Great, which still survives.

Turibius held a local synod in 446. After his death at Astorga in 460, he was revered as a saint. According to tradition, his relics, along with a piece of the lignum crucis he had brought from Jerusalem, were transferred to the Monastery of Liébana around the middle of the eighth century. His feast day is April 16 in the Roman Catholic Church. He is usually portrayed with a mitre and is not to be confused with Turibius of Liébana.

== Bibliography ==
- Butler, Alban (1861). "St. Turibius, Bishop of Astorga". In John Murphy (ed.). The lives of the fathers, martyrs, and other principal saints. Vol. IV. ISBN 0-559-17704-6.
- Fleury, Claude (1844). John Henry Newman (ed.). The Ecclesiastical History of M. L'abbé Fleury: From A.D. 429 to A.D. 456. Oxford: J.H. Parker.
- Walsh, John (1992). Relic and Literature: St Toribius of Astorga and his arca sancta. St Albans: David Hook. ISBN 978-0-9517564-1-6.
- González García, Miguel Ángel (1993). "Iconografía De Santo Toribio De Astorga. Geografía Y Fuentes". Cuadernos de Arte e Iconografia. 4 (11). Archived from the original on 2008-06-16.
