= Collegiate church of San Martin de Elines, Cantabria =

Church in Cantabria, Spain

Coordinates: 42.8289°N 3.8690°W

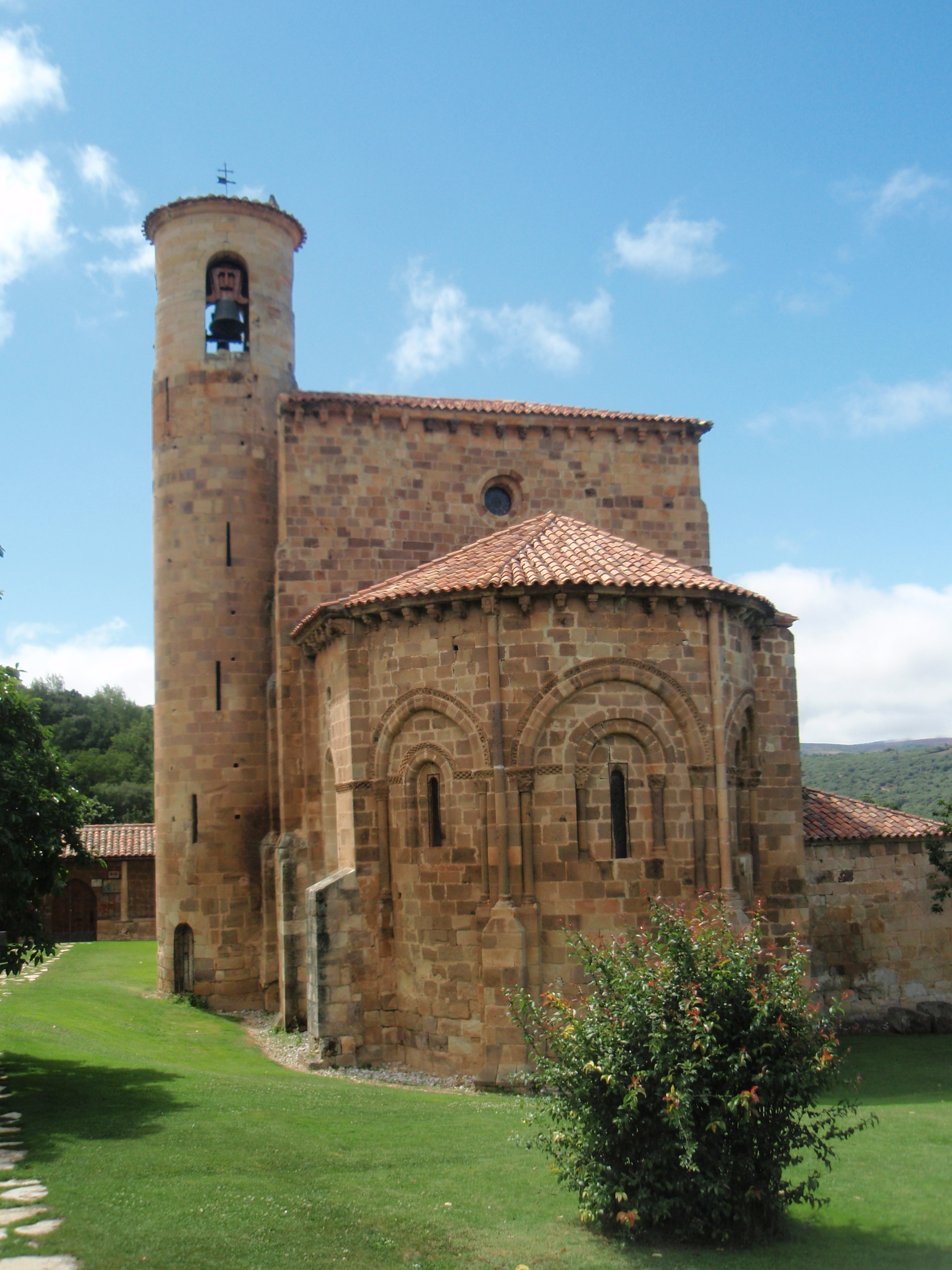
The church of San Martin de Elines

The church of San Martin de Elines is located in the valley of Valderredible, in the Province of Cantabria, Spain. Initially part of a monastery, St Martin's later became a collegiate church under the jurisdiction of the diocese of Burgos.

The existing church was built in the early 12c in the Romanesque style. Surviving remains of some mozarabic arches and windows located on the northern wall of the cloister suggest an earlier foundation, probably around the 10c.

== The building ==
The building follows the standard Romanesque style with a single rounded apse on the eastern side and a basilical nave of remarkable height. The exterior of the apse is divided into three panels by two decorative columns. The cornice is decorated with a set of corbels carved with animal heads, human figures and abstract motifs.

The entrance to the church is placed on the western façade. It is decorated with a semi-circular arch which is supported on columns with capitals carved with vegetal motifs. The bell tower is of circular shape and is attached to the southern wall of the building.

== The interior ==
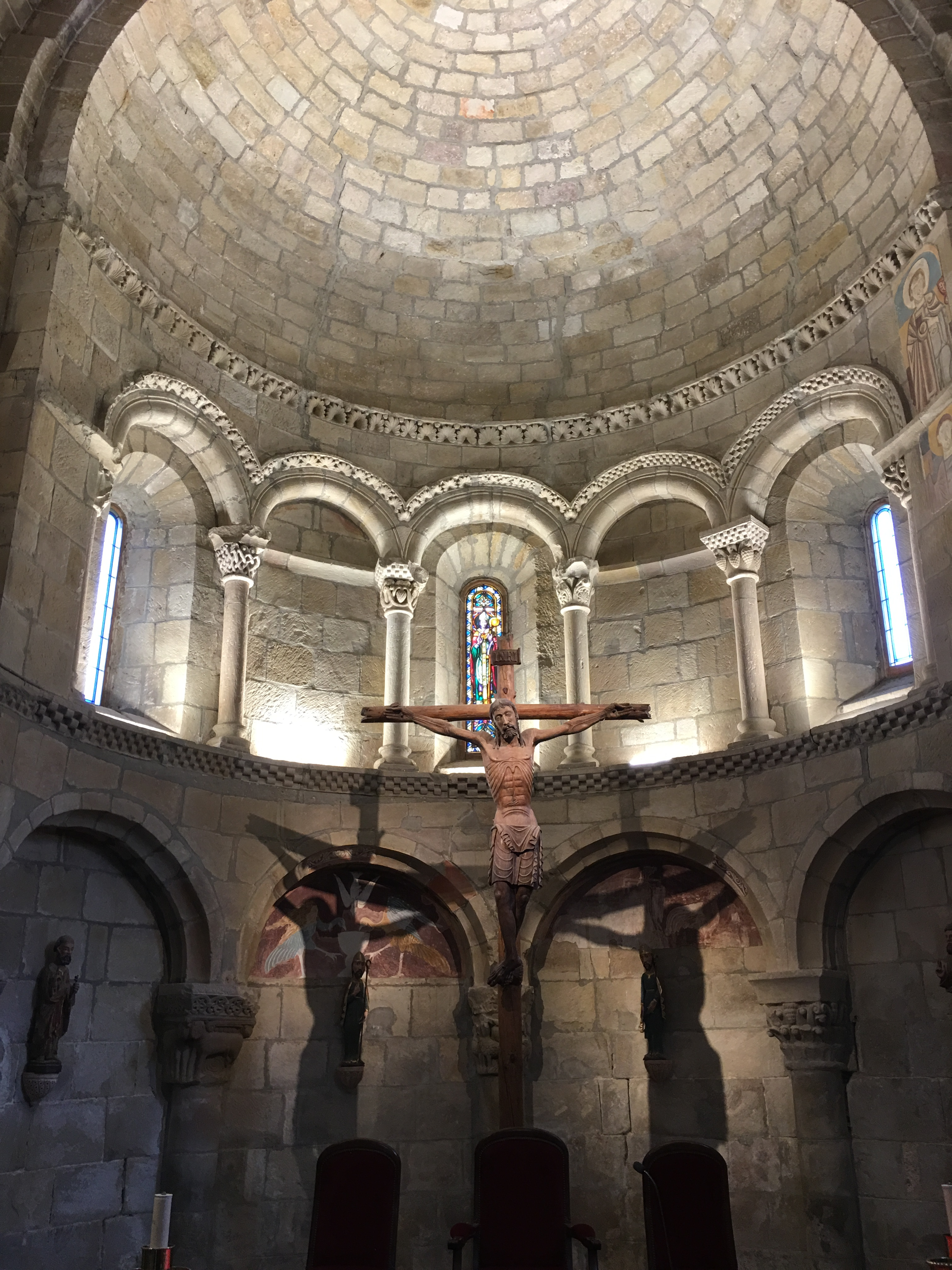
Interior

The apse is decorated with blind arcades on two levels. The lower arcade is composed of four semi-circular arches while the upper one has been decorated with five arches, also semi-circular. The capitals are all sculpted but have suffered damage.

The apse retains traces of Romanesque paintings, where two figures looking frontally, probably apostles, can be identified; the only surviving example in the province of Cantabria.

The large rounded capitals that sit on top of the four columns supporting the cupola are decorated with carvings of remarkable quality. One of the capitals represents Daniel among the lions and a second capital seems to depict Samson fighting a lion. A third capital displays passages of the Adoration of the Magi and the Massacre of the Innocents. A fourth one is decorated with cone pines and another scene shows lions devouring human figures.

== The cloister ==
The cloister is located west of the church and was built in the 16c in a simple Renaissance style. It houses a collection of medieval sarcophagus, some richly decorated.

== Gallery ==
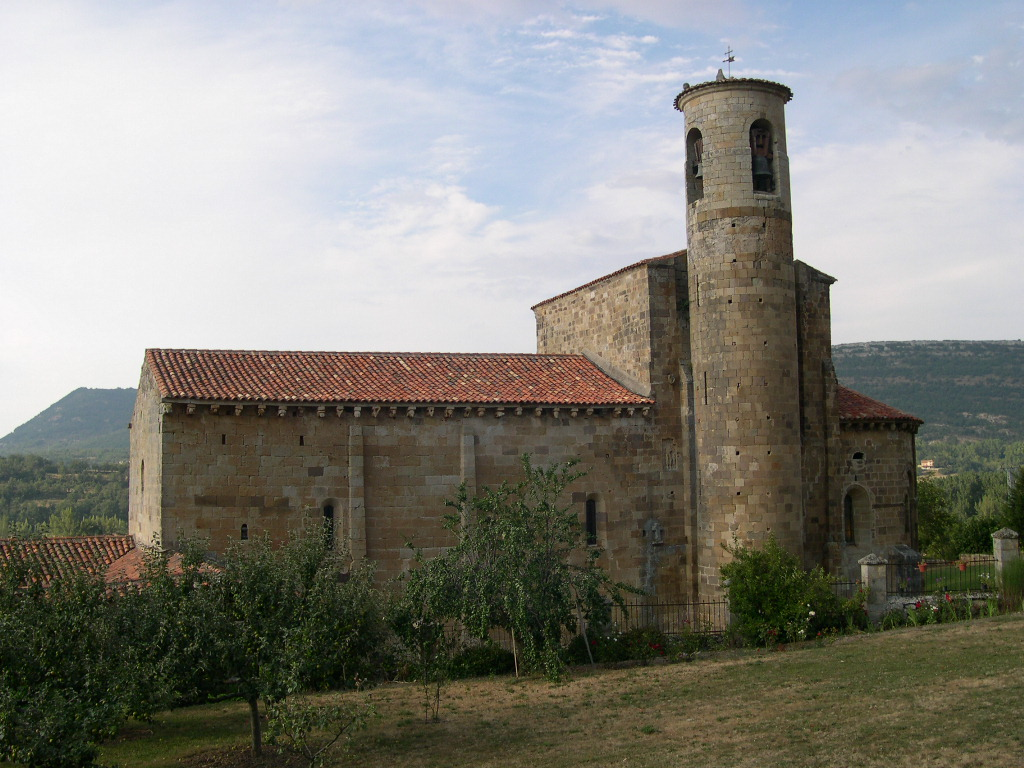
The church viewed from the south

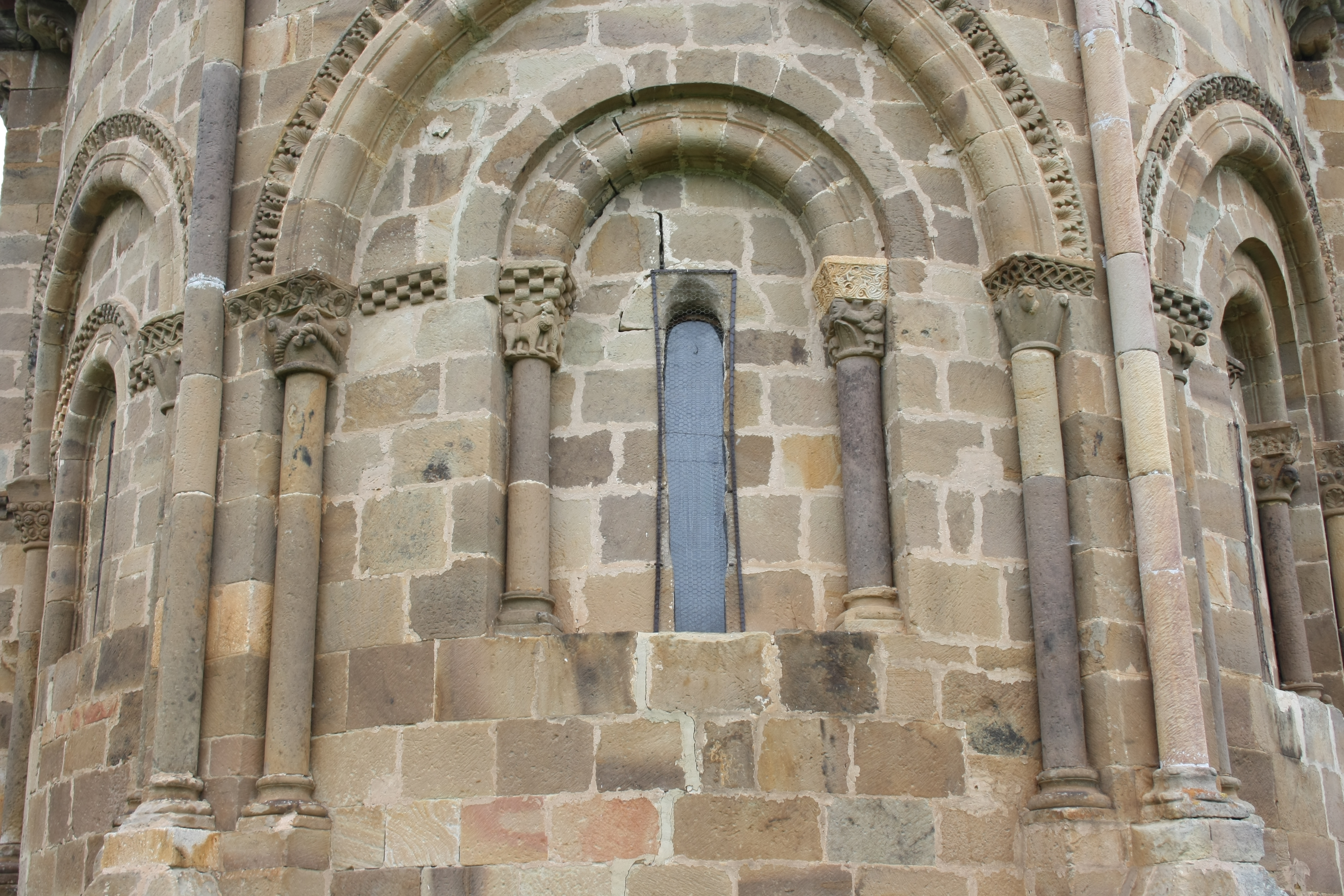
Detail of the apse

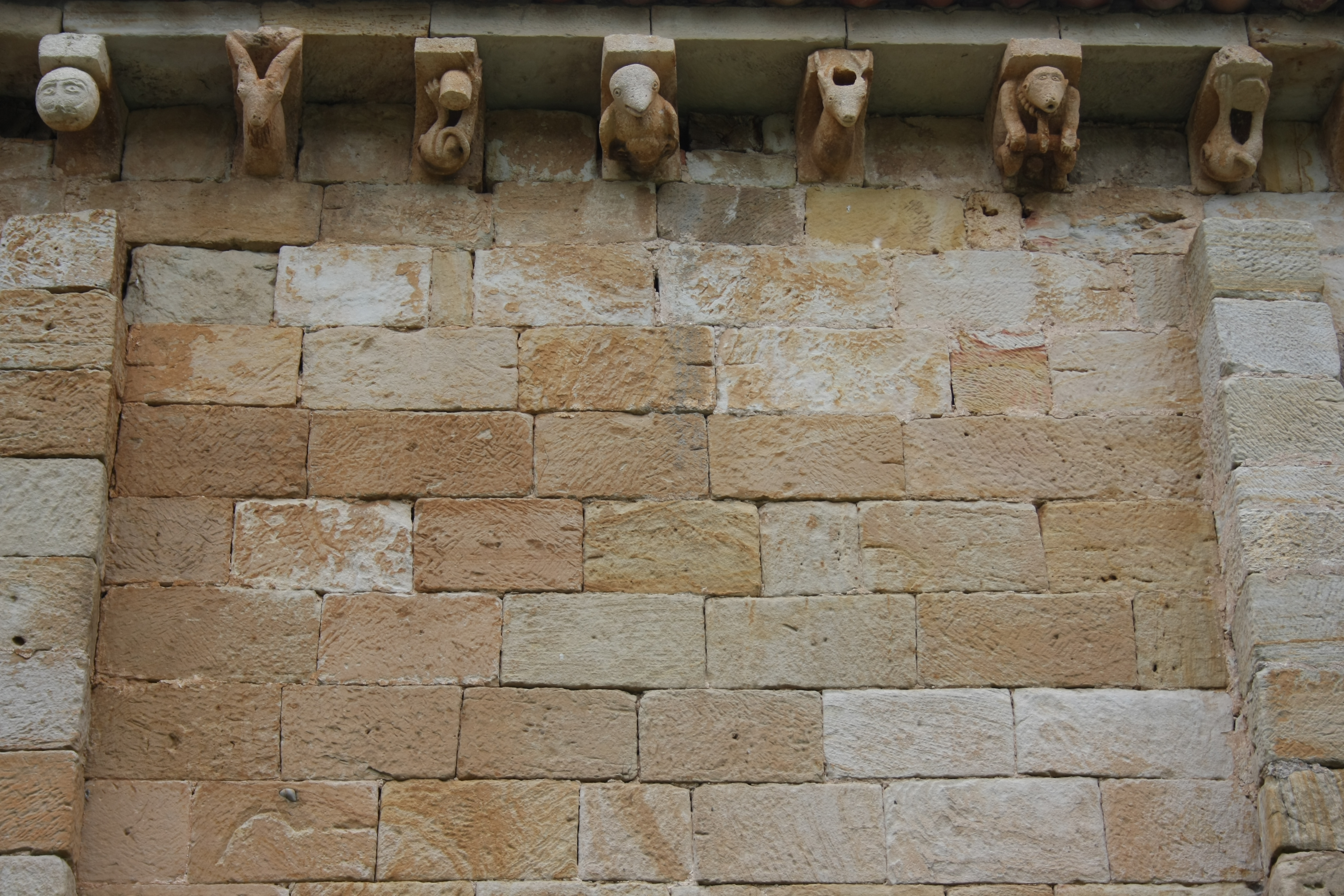
Corbels

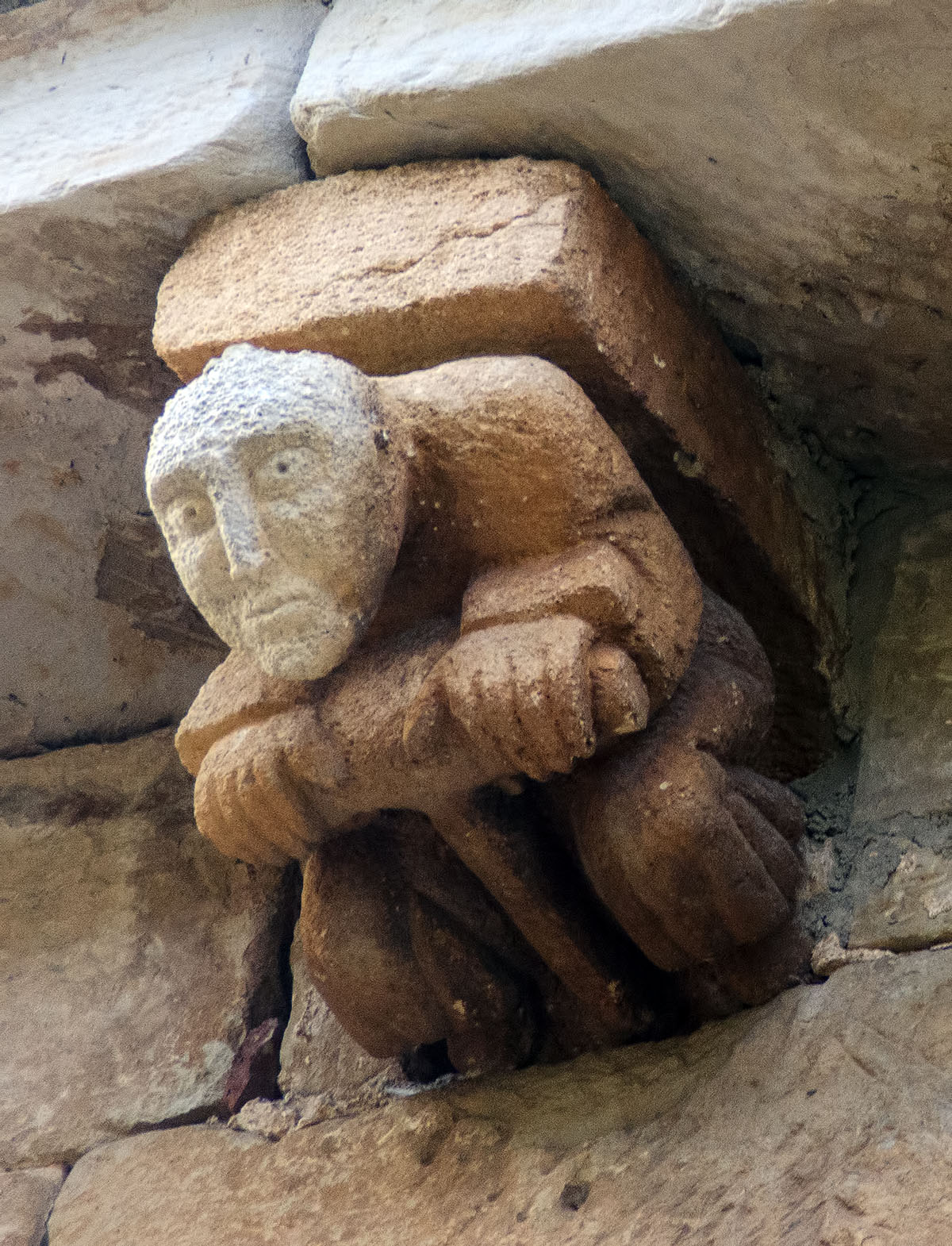
Detail of a corbel

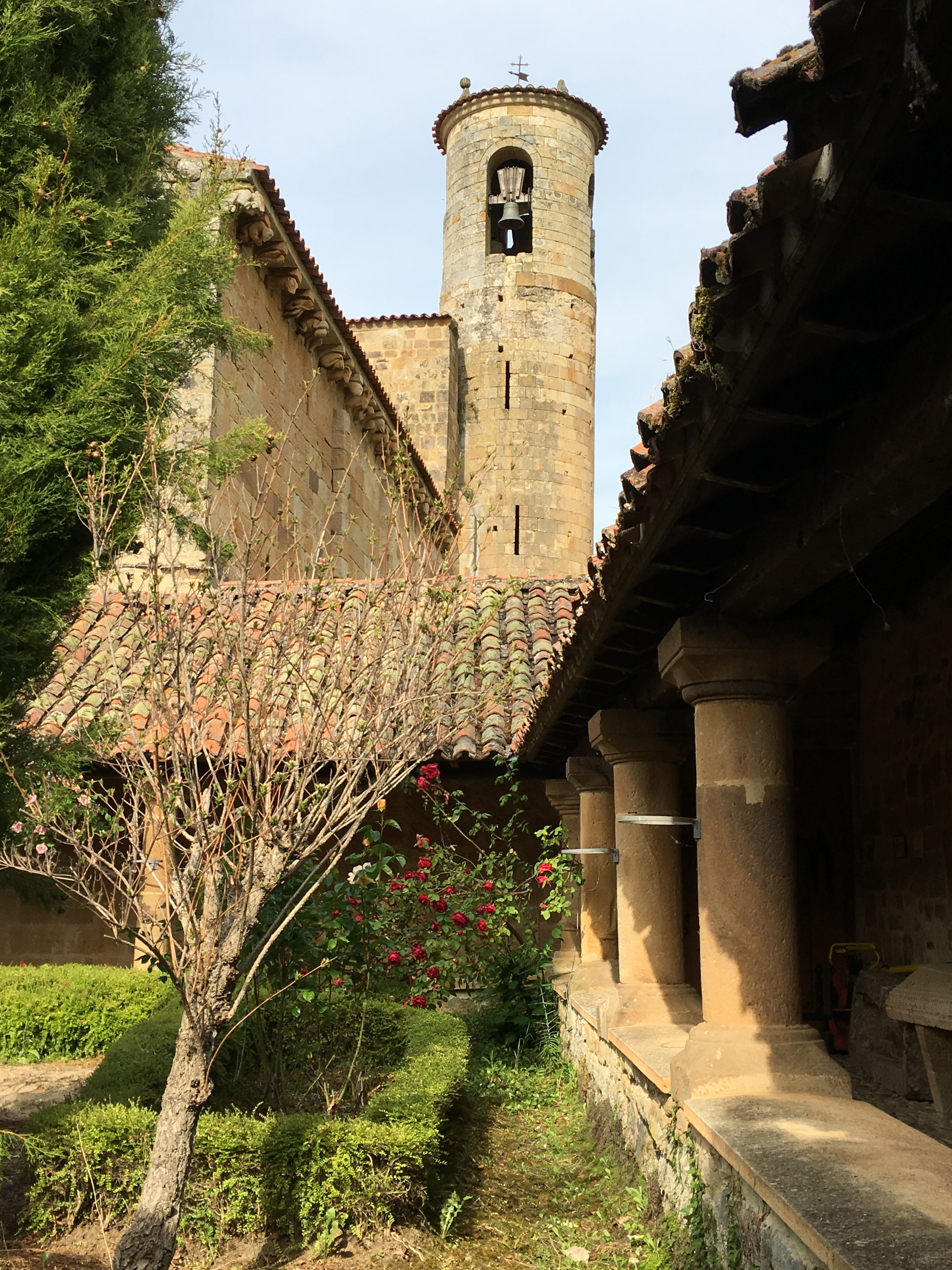
Cloister

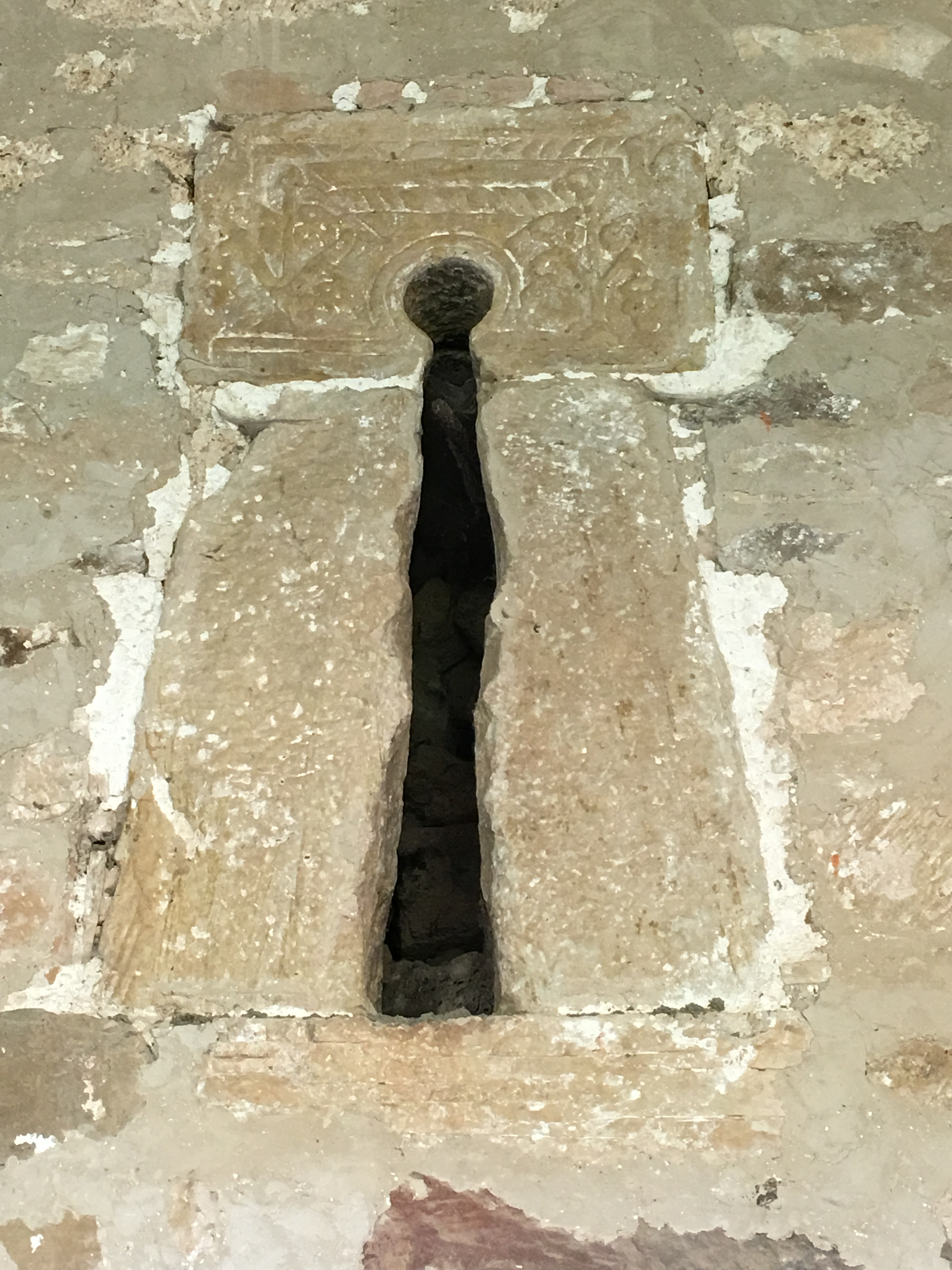
Mozarabic window

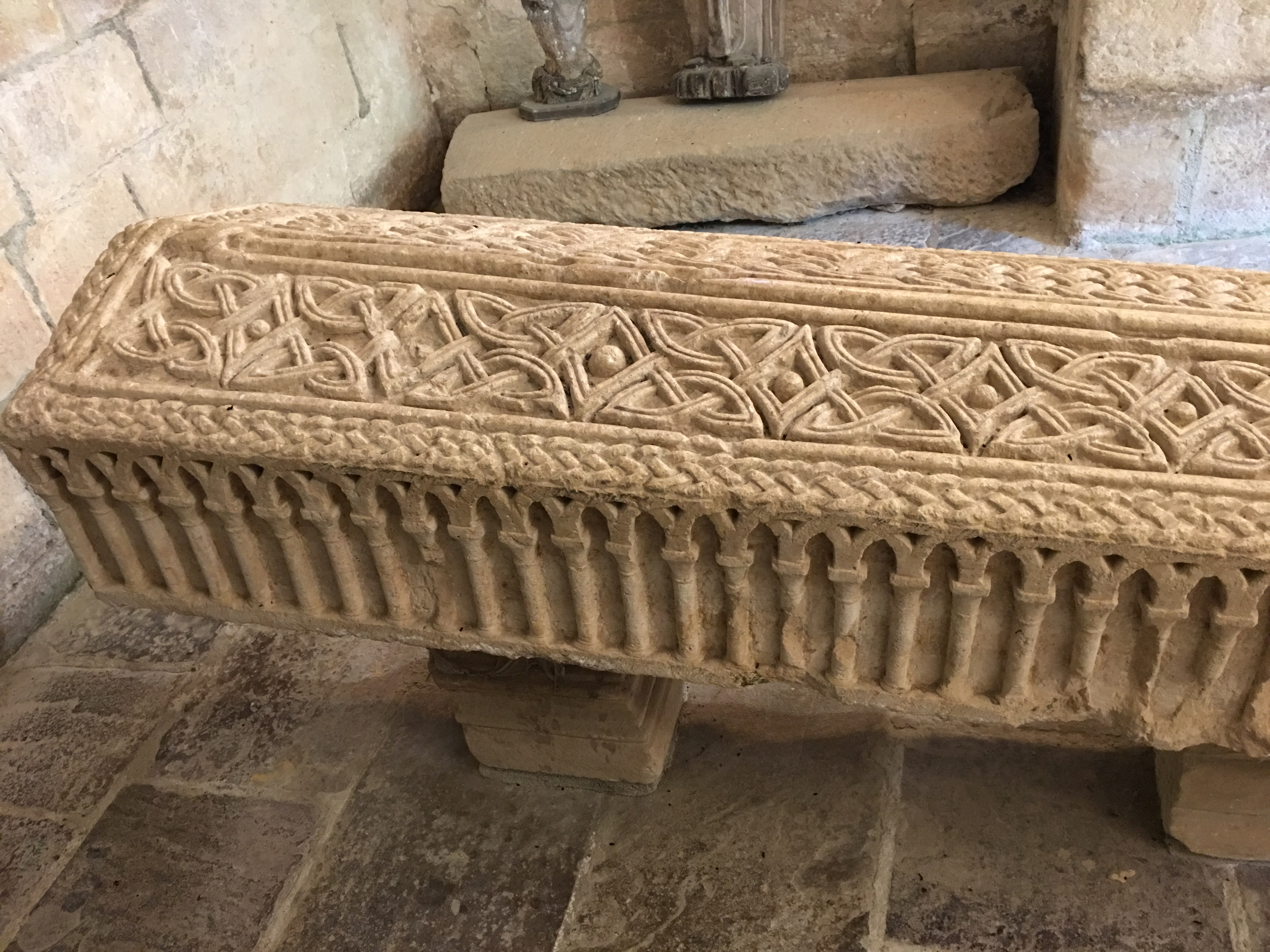
Sarcophagus

== Conservation ==
The building was declared Monumento histórico-artístico Nacional in 1931.
