= Castro Urdiales =

- Municipality
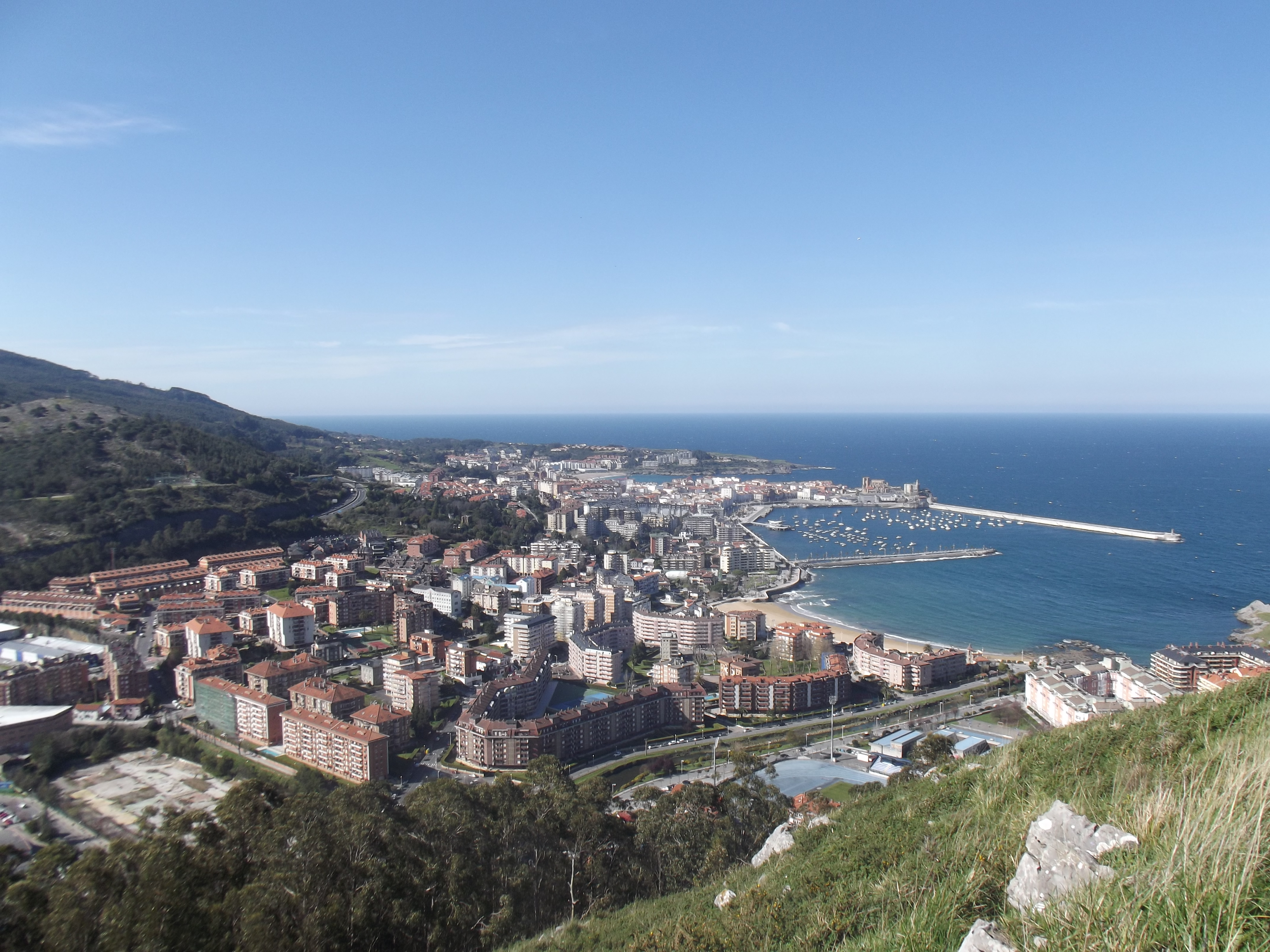
- View of Castro Urdiales from Mount Cueto

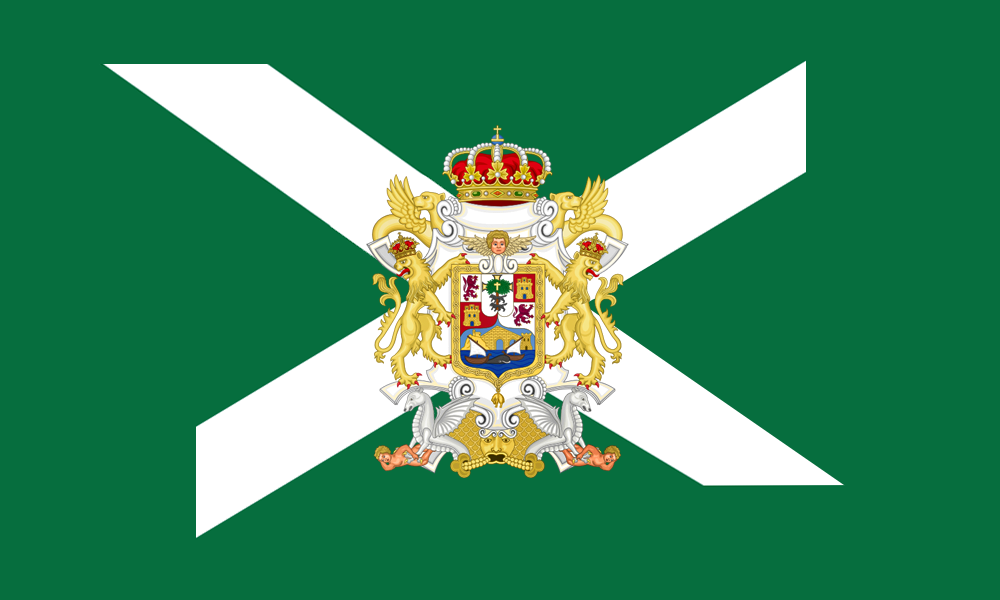
- Flag Coat of arms

- Location of Castro Urdiales municipality in Cantabria

- Location in Spain Castro Urdiales (Cantabria)
- Coordinates: 43°23′4″N 3°12′54″W
- Country: Spain
- Autonomous community: Cantabria
- Province: Cantabria
- Comarca: Eastern coast of Cantabria
- Founded: Flaviobriga 74 AD

Government
  - Alcalde: Susana Herrán Martín (2019) (PSOE)

Area
  - Total: 96.72 km^{2} (37.34 sq mi)
- Elevation: 19 m (62 ft)

Population (2025-01-01)
  - Total: 33,450
  - Density: 345.8/km^{2} (895.7/sq mi)
- Demonym: Castreños
- Time zone: UTC+1 (CET)
  - Summer (DST): UTC+2 (CEST)
- Postal code: 39700
- Website: Official website

Castro Urdiales (Spanish pronunciation: [ˈkastɾowɾˈðjales]) is a seaport of northern Spain, in the autonomous community of Cantabria, situated on the Bay of Biscay. Castro Urdiales is a modern town, although its castle and the Gothic-style parish church of Santa María de la Asunción, date from the Middle Ages. Its chief industries are tourism, fishing, and oil-packing of fish, especially sardines and anchovies. The Lolin and La Castreña anchovy canning factories serve as a reminder of the town's closeness to this industry and its proximity to the sea.

Although the number of people registered in the town is around 32,000, the summer population can double or even triple this figure. The town is popular because of its beaches and scenic harbor.

== History ==
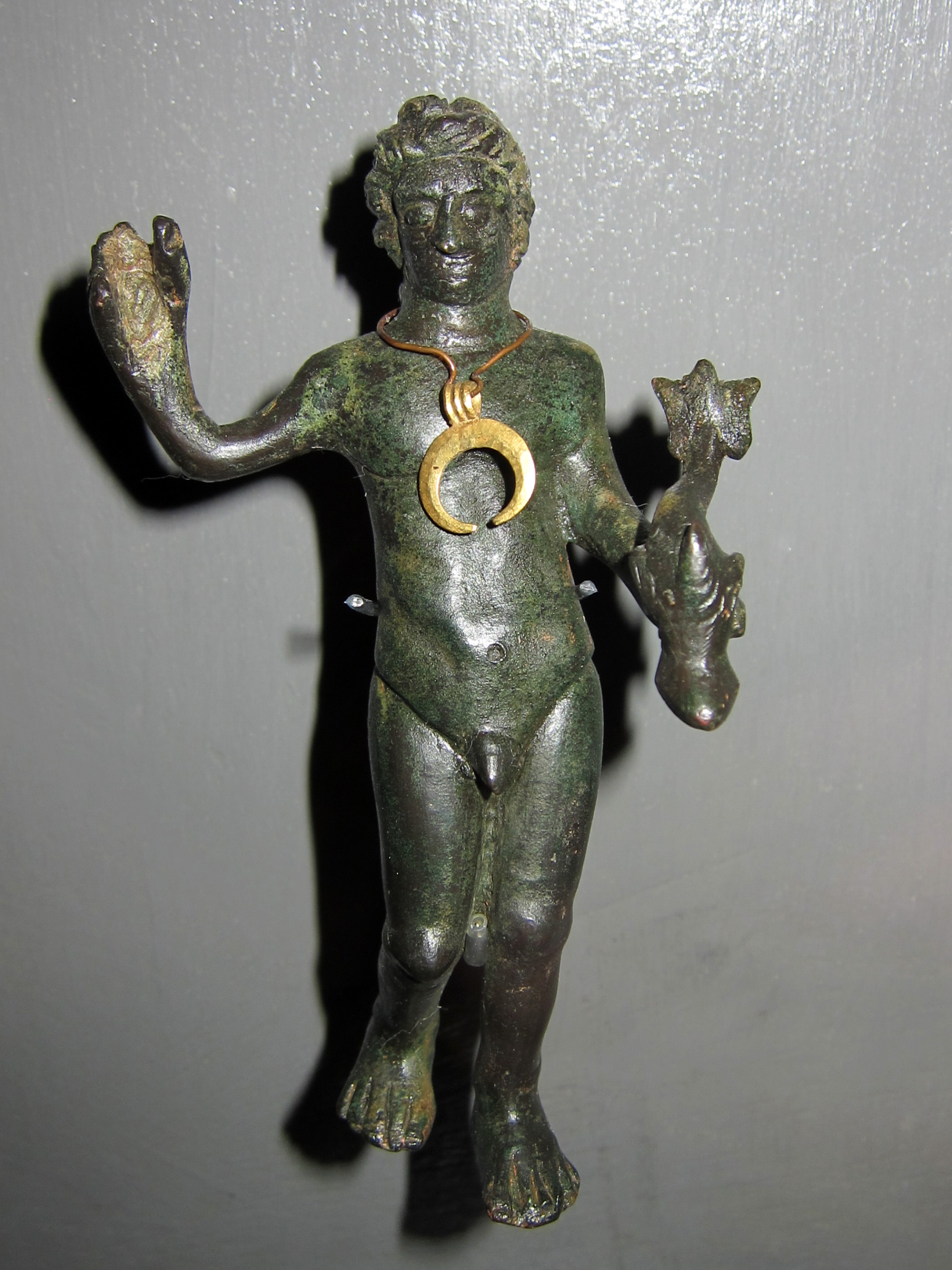
Figure of a young Neptune from Mount Cueto

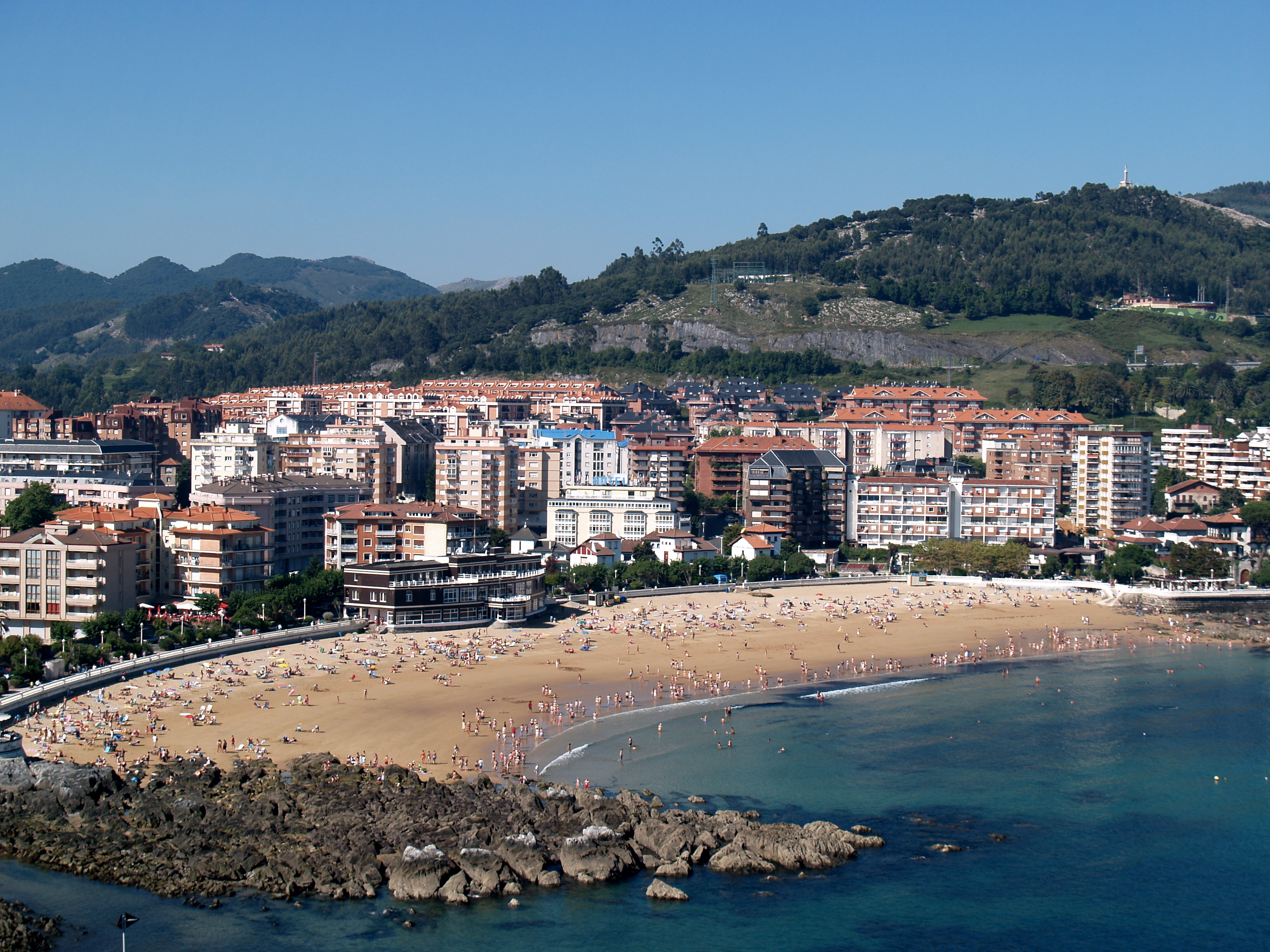
View of Brazomar beach.

Castro Urdiales was originally called Portus Amanum, and was the chief city of the Autrigones. In AD 74 a Roman colony was established under the name Flaviobriga, during the reign of emperor Vespasian. It was most likely established to mine the abundant iron in the area.

In 1163 the town of Castro Urdiales received its municipal charter. It lay at the western tip of the coastline of Navarre until 1200, when the kingdom was invaded by Alfonso VIII of Castile. Castro Urdiales benefited much from its location at a crossroads in the trade between northern Europe and Castile. It remained in Biscay until 1476 at least, but it is not cited in the seigneury's assemblies thereafter. Until the 18th century, the town recurrently attempted a reincorporation to Biscay (attested in 1799), but its attempts were met with the frontal refusal of Bilbao on account that it could tip the scale against its own trade balance.

It was destroyed by the French in 1813, but was speedily rebuilt and fortified. Its rapid rise in population and prosperity dates from the increased development of iron mining and railway communication which took place after 1879.

== Main sights ==
The monument complex of Castro Urdiales, also known as Puebla Vieja, has medieval origins and is located near the sea. It was declared a Conjunto histórico in 1978.

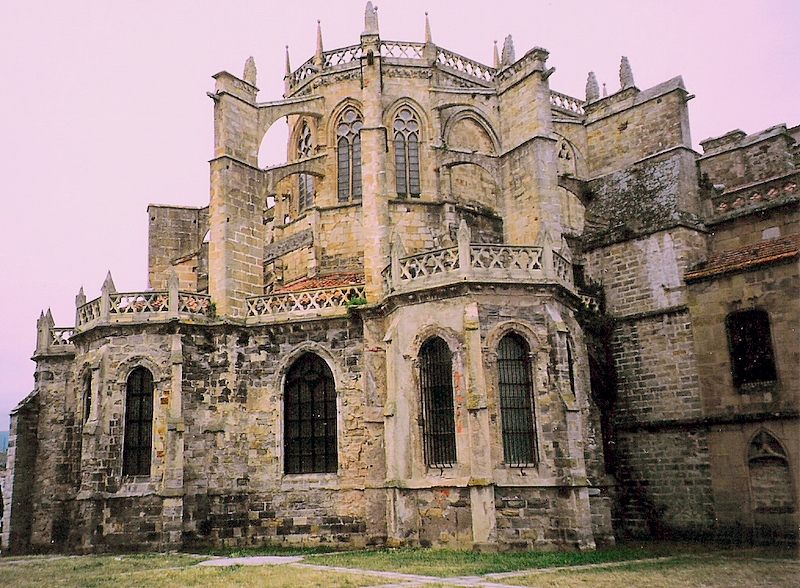
Santa María de la Asuncion Church, apse

The Church of Santa María de la Asunción is in Gothic style. Built under the protection of King Alfonso VIII of Castile in the 13th century (though it was finished in the 15th century), it is a basilica church with three naves. In the interior are the images of the White Virgin and the Reclining Christ, and three Gothic carvings of the Magi. It was declared a National Monument in 1931.

The Castle of Santa Ana is located near the port and the church of Santa María de la Asunción. In modern times it housed a lighthouse.

Other sights include:

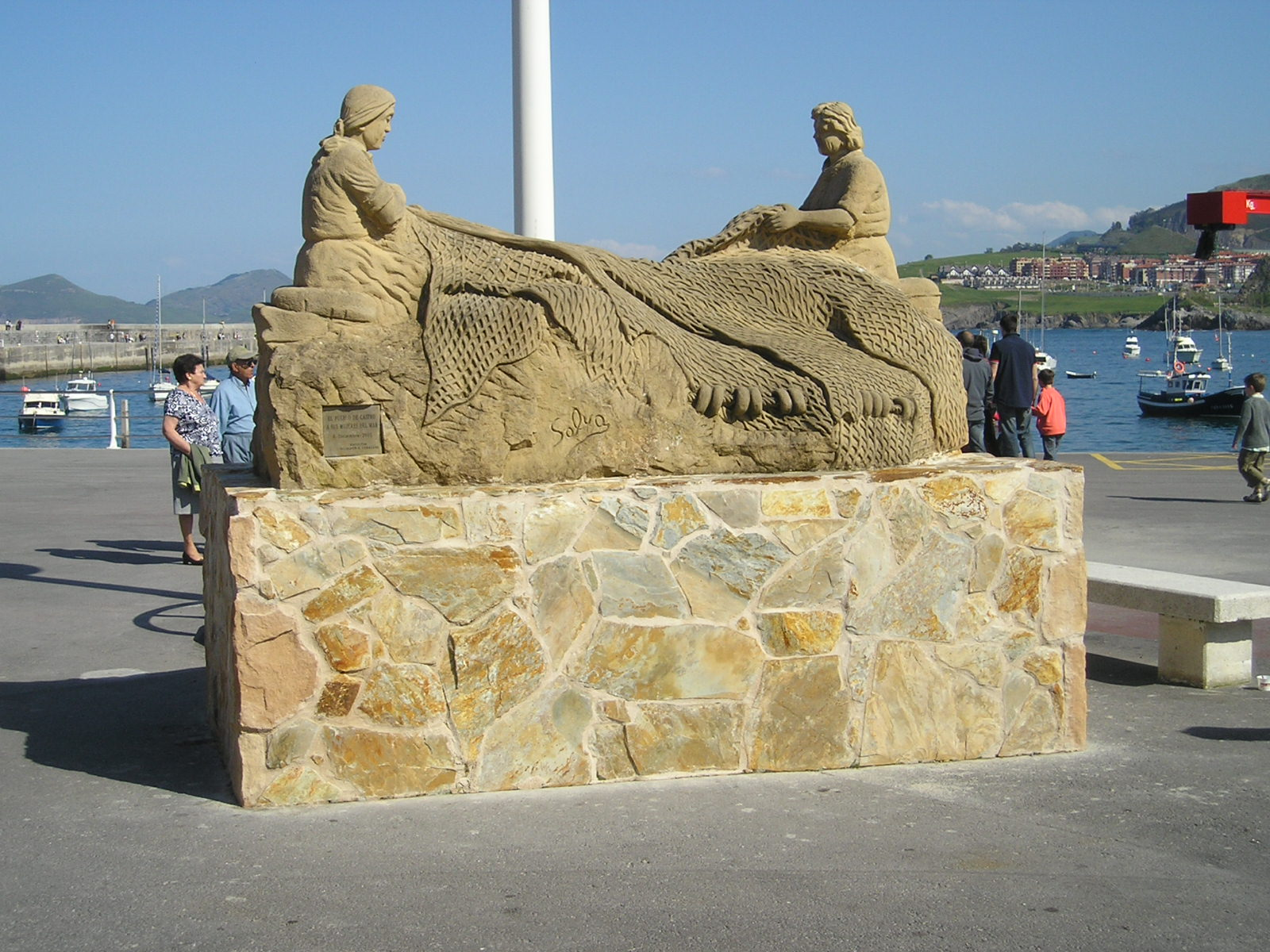
Monument on the waterfront in Castro Urdiales

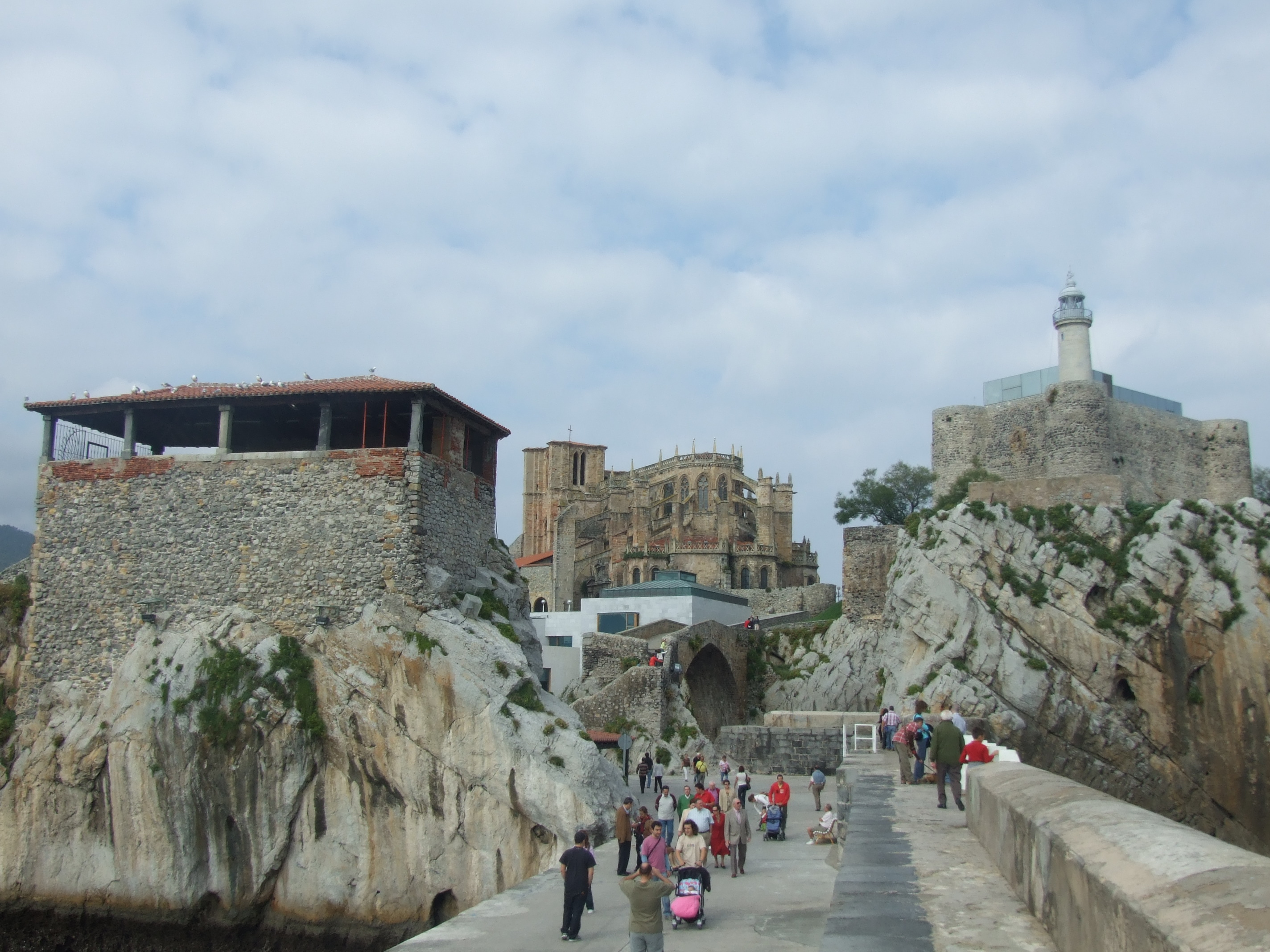
Lighthouse, church and Santa Ana

- Palace, castle-observatory and Ocharan gardens, protected since 1985. The castle-observatory, dating back to 1914 and designed by local architect Eladio Laredo, is in neo-Gothic style. The Ocharan Palace, or Toki-Eder, was built in 1901, also by the local architect Eladio Laredo. It is an eclectic-style building, with a portico of columns and other elements of Greek taste, and with a multicolored tile frieze designed by Daniel Zuloaga.
- Ruins of the medieval tower of the Templars, in Allendelagua, on the mountain side. It belonged to the Knights Templars and is currently in poor condition.
- Cave of El Cuco, west of the town. It houses rock carvings and paintings from the Upper Paleolithic period, which depict animals such as deer, goats and horses.
- Cave of La Lastrilla
- Cave Grande or de los Corrales
- Cave Aurelia
- Castro of la Peña de Sámano
- Remains of Flavióbriga and the medieval village, protected since 1996. The Flavióbriga archaeological site is under the Old town, two meters deep. Remains of a Roman colony can be visited in the Regional Museum of Prehistory and Archaeology of Cantabria.
- Water driving of El Chorrillo, a work of hydraulic engineering from the Roman age.
- Tower-House of Los Otañes, in Otañes.
- Ruins of the Hospital de la Vera Cruz, in Islares.
- City Hall (16th century)
- Tower-House of Cerdigo, built in Cerdigo between the 17th and 18th centuries.
- Archaeological site of Patera de Otañes, in the village of Otañes.
- Roman mile-stone, opposite the Church of Santa María. Dating to 61 AD, it marked the distance to Pisoraca. It has an inscription that reads "Nero Claudius, son of the divine Claudius, Caesar, Augustus, Germanicus, Pontifex maximus, with the tribunician power for eighth time, the empire for ninth and the consulate for fourth. From Pisoraca one hundred and eighty miles".
- Remains of the Iglesia de San Pedro (11th century), in Romanesque style.
- A historic mineral loader, the Cargadero de Dícido

== Twin towns ==
- Aire-sur-l'Adour, France
- (Sahrawi Arab Democratic Republic) Bucraa, Western Sahara
- (Sahrawi Arab Democratic Republic) Miyek, Western Sahara
- Jerez de la Frontera, Spain

== See also ==
- Hermandad de las Cuatro Villas
