= Santo Toribio de Liébana =

Cultural property in Camaleño, Spain

Monastery of Santo Toribio de Liébana
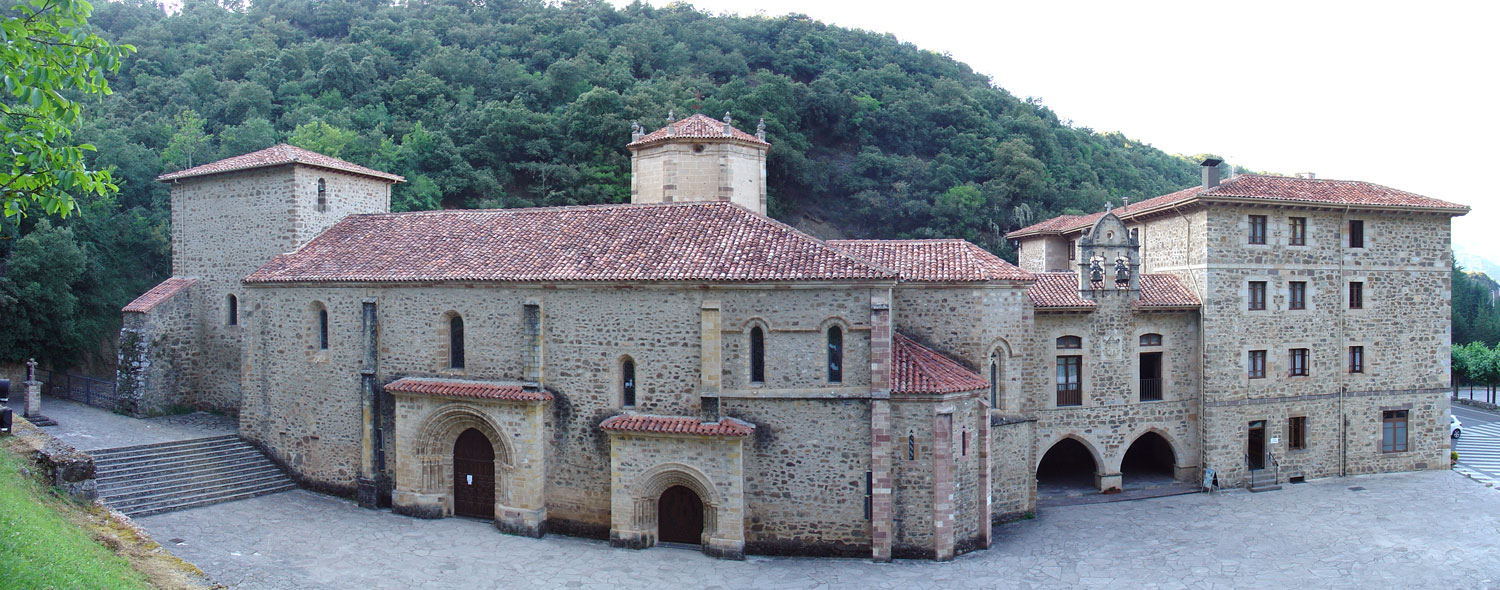
- Santo Toribio de Liébana, Cantabria (Spain)

Religion
- Affiliation: Roman Catholic
- Status: Monastery

Location
- Location: Camaleño (Cantabria), Spain
- Interactive map of Monastery of Santo Toribio de Liébana
- Coordinates: 43°9′0″N 4°39′14.4″W

Architecture
- Type: Monastery
- Style: Romanesque
- Completed: 12th century
- UNESCO World Heritage Site
- Type: Cultural
- Criteria: ii, iv, vi
- Designated: 2015 (32nd session)
- Parent listing: Routes of Santiago de Compostela: Camino Francés and Routes of Northern Spain
- Reference no.: 669bis-020
- Region: Europe and North America
- Spanish Cultural Heritage
- Type: Non-movable
- Criteria: Monument
- Designated: 11 August 1953
- Reference no.: RI-51-0001242

Website
- Official Website

The Monastery of Santo Toribio de Liébana is a Roman Catholic monastery located in the district of Liébana, near Potes in Cantabria, Spain. Located in the Cantabrian Mountains in northern Spain, the monastery is one of the five places in Roman Catholicism, together with Rome, Jerusalem, Santiago de Compostela and Caravaca de la Cruz, that has the privilege of issuing perpetual indulgences.

The monastery was founded prior to the 6th century. The monastery holds and venerates part of the Lignum Crucis discovered in Jerusalem by Saint Helena of Constantinople, which is claimed to be the largest piece held. Brought from the Church of the Holy Sepulchre by Saint Turibius of Astorga, the left arm of the True Cross is kept on a gilded silver reliquary. The monastery was initially dedicated to St. Martin of Tours but its name was changed in the 12th century.

On April 16, 1961, the Franciscan friars, Custodians of the Holy Places, were entrusted with the relic's safekeeping and with the promotion of the devotion to the Holy Cross.

== History ==
Its origins are obscure, but it was during the reign of Alfonso I of Asturias, who was repopulating the area around Liébana during the early part of the reconquest of Spain in the mid-8th century. The first reference to the monastery of Turieno with the protection of Saint Turibius was made in 1125. Its foundation is attributed to a 6th-century Bishop of Palencia called Turibius of Liébana, who retired with some companions to Liébana to live according to the Benedictine rule. When it was founded, the monastery was first dedicated to Saint Martin of Tours, which name over time was changed to Saint Turibius of Liébana. Probably during the 8th century, the body of another 6th-century bishop, Saint Turibius of Astorga was moved to the monastery, along with relics which he was believed to have brought from the Holy Land for safekeeping.

The most important of these is that of the Wood of the True Cross (Lignum Crucis), believed by some Roman Catholics to be the biggest surviving piece of the cross upon which Jesus Christ was crucified. Because of this, the monastery was an important pilgrimage centre, and is one of the most important holy sites of Roman Catholicism in Europe, alongside other notable places such as Rome, Santiago de Compostela, Caravaca de la Cruz and Assisi. The monastery was also where the 8th century monk Beatus of Liébana wrote and illustrated his works, such as his Commentary on the Apocalypse.

The monastery was originally a royal possession, but it was given by Alfonso VIII of Castile to Count Gómez y Countess Emilia, who then passed it on to the monastery of Oña (Burgos), along with other properties in Liébana and neighbouring provinces. The monastic community ceased to exist after the forced sale of religious land in Spain in 1837, but was replaced in 1961 by a small community of Friars Minor.

== Church ==
The most important building is the gothic church, whose construction began in 1256, though it has been remodelled several times since. It is built on the site of a pre-Romanesque and a Romanesque building (perhaps Asturian or Mozarabic in style). It has the clarity of line and space, and the surrounding decoration that characterises the architecture of San Bernardo. The church is rectangular in plan with three aisles; a tower at the foot of the central, widest aisle, and three polygonal apses. Its facade is similar to that of the Abbey of the Holy Bodies, the cathedral of Santander. Its doors in the southern wall are Romanesque in style and possibly predate the building inside. The principal door, the Puerta del Perdón (Door of Forgiveness) is only ever opened during each Jubilee Year when Saint Turibius' day coincides with a Sunday. The cloister was completed in the 17th century.

== The True Cross ==
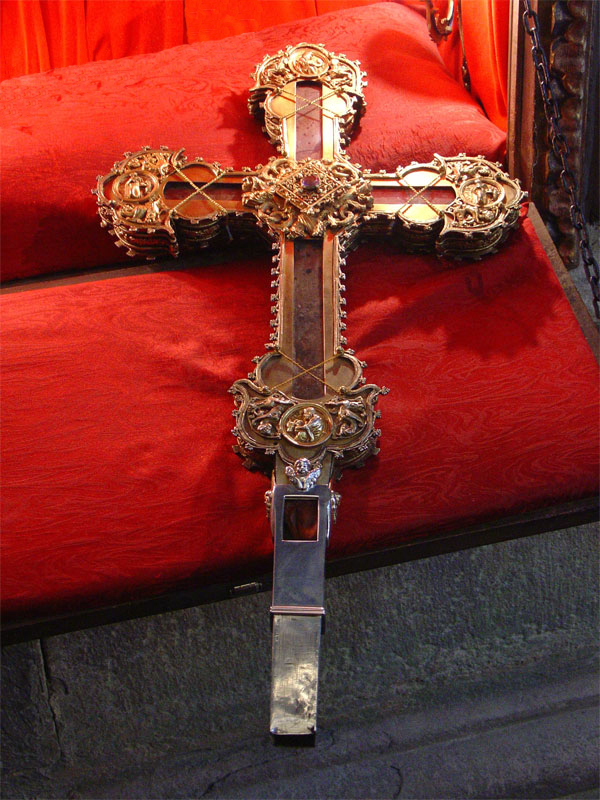
The largest surviving piece of the True Cross.

According to tradition, this relic is part of the True Cross that the Empress Saint Helena unearthed in Jerusalem. From there, Saint Turibius of Astorga, Custodian of the Holy Places, took it to the cathedral of his hometown in Astorga, Spain, where he was soon made bishop. When the Moors invaded Spain in 711, the relic was hidden along with others in a fold on Mount Viorna in the Liebana Valley, next to St. Turibius' relics. Both relics were eventually transferred to the monastery that immediately became an important place to be visited by pilgrims on their way to Santiago de Compostela. Documents dated 1507 state that, "since time immemorial" the Jubilee is celebrated every time the saint's feast-day falls on a Sunday.

Fr. Sandoval, chronicler of the Benedictine order, wrote that this relic is the "left arm of the Holy Cross. It was sawed and assembled in the form of a cross, leaving intact the hole where was nailed down the hand of Christ". The vertical bar is 635 millimetres (25.0 in) long and the crossbar is 393 millimetres (15.5 in) long. The cross has a thickness of 38 millimetres (1.5 in). It is the largest preserved relic of the True Cross.

The wood was embedded in a Gothic silver gilt cross, manufactured by a workshop of Valladolid in 1679. It lies in a housing of golden wood in a baroque, domed, early 18th-century chapel in the north wall of the church, looked over by an effigy of the chapel's founder, Francisco de Cosío y Otero (1640–1715), Grand Inquisitor of Madrid and later Archbishop of Bogotá in Colombia, who was born locally.

In 1817 Ignacio Ramón de Roda, Bishop of León, went to the monastery and asked permission of the prior of the Benedictine monks to remove a portion of the Cross. Two pieces of wood arranged in the form of a cross in a reliquary were given to Don Joachim and Don Felix Columbus, descendants of Christopher Columbus, for the chapel of their family castle in Asturias. In 1909 Terry and Mathilde Boal inherited and imported to their American estate the chapel of the Columbus family, including an admiral's desk that belonged to the famous explorer himself. They brought from Spain to Boalsburg, Pennsylvania, the entrance door and the whole interior of the Columbus Chapel with the relic of the True Cross.

In 1958 a scientific investigation carried out by Madrid's Forestry Research Institute concluded that the relic is of a Mediterranean Cypress wood (Cupressus sempervirens), very common in Israel, and could be older than 2,000 years.
