= Tambre (river) =

River in Galicia, Spain

Coordinates: 42.8282°N 8.8730°W

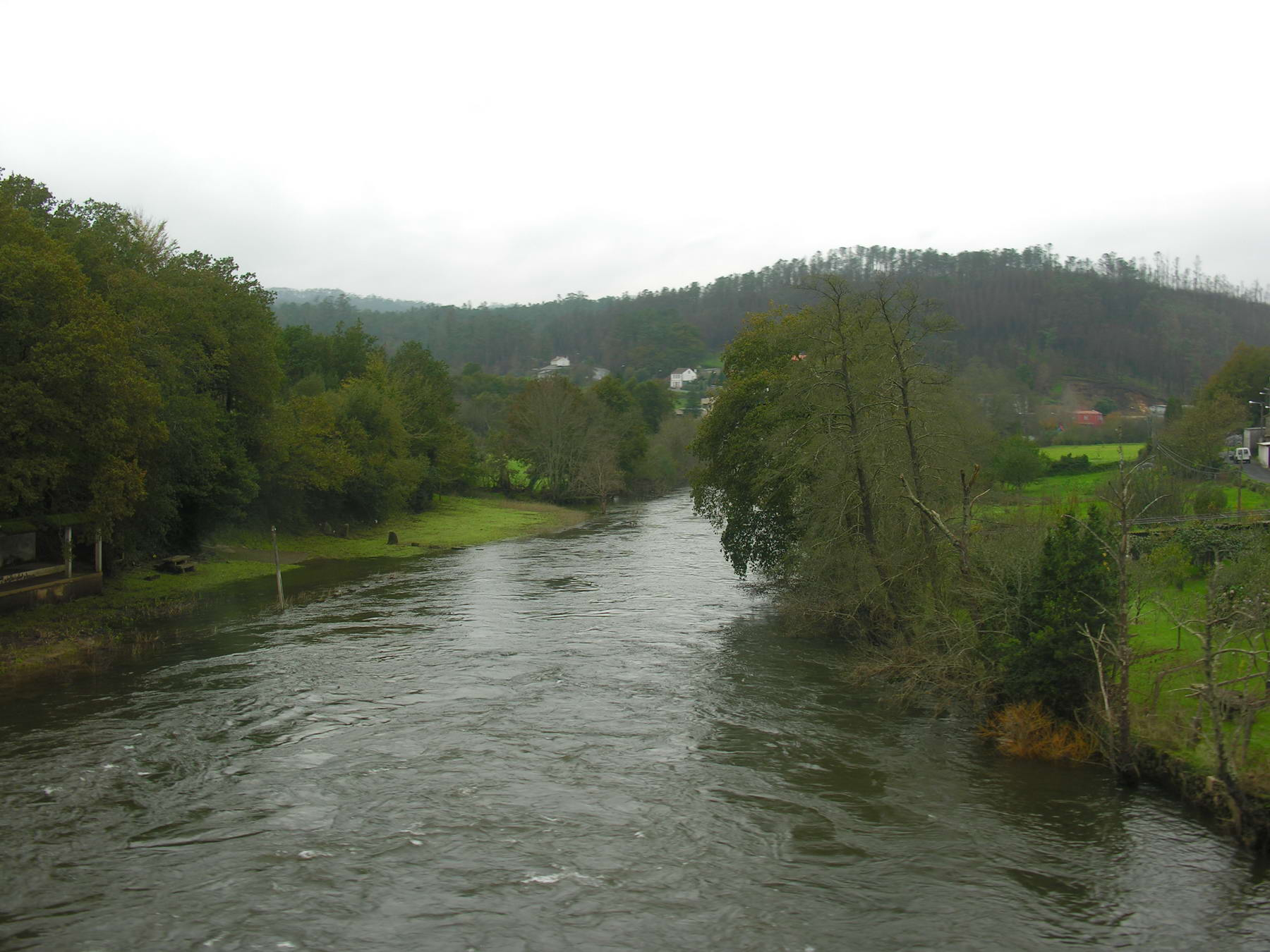
- River Tambre

- Tambre river basin (dark blue)
- Native name: Río Tambre (Spanish)

Location
- Country: Spain
- State: Galicia (Spain)

Physical characteristics
- Source: Montes de Bocelo
  - location: Sobrado, A Coruña
- Length: 134 km (83 mi)
- Basin size: 1,531 km^{2} (591 sq mi)
- Discharge
  - location: Ponte Nafonso
  - average: 54.1 m^{3}/s (1,910 cu ft/s)
  - maximum: 1,160 m^{3}/s (41,000 cu ft/s)12 December 1989

Basin features
- Tributaries
  - left: Mera, Sionlla
  - right: Maruzo, Samo, Lengüelle, Dubra, Barcala

The Tambre is a coastal river that crosses Galicia, in northwestern Spain. Its basin covers 1,531 square kilometres (591 mi^{2}).

The river flows through the province of A Coruña; the municipalities along its course are Sobrado, Curtis, Vilasantar, Boimorto, Mesía, Frades, Arzúa, O Pino, Oroso, Ordes, Trazo, Tordoia, Santiago de Compostela, Val do Dubra, Ames, A Baña, Brion, Negreira, Outes, Mazaricos, Noia and Lousame. Its mouth forms the Ría de Muros e Noia estuary.

It has been designated a Site of Community Importance.

In ancient times it was called Támaris, its name being related to that of the River Tamar in Cornwall. It was from the lands north of this river that the Spanish County of Trastámara and the royal House of Trastámara derive their name (Tras-Támara meaning "across the Tambre"). Tamarix may have derived its name from the river.

== Gallery ==
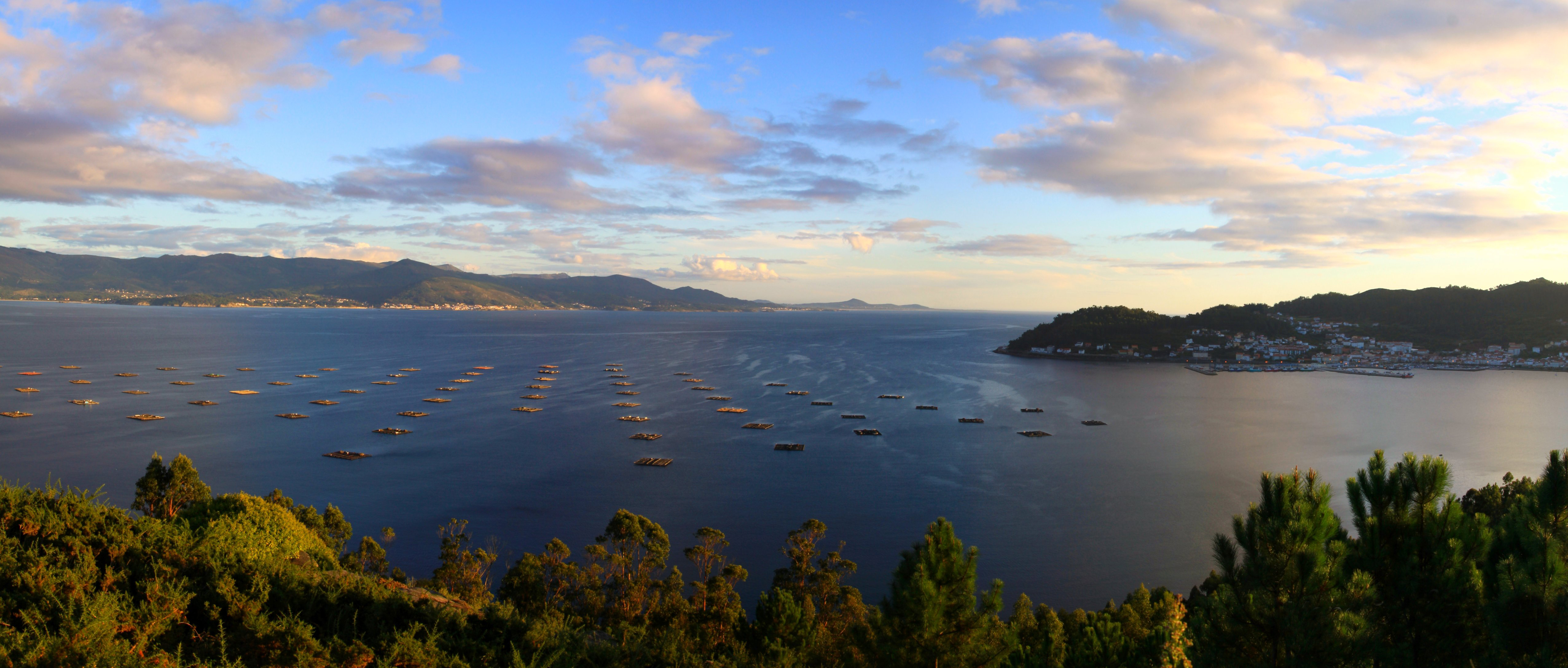
Ría de Muros e Noia

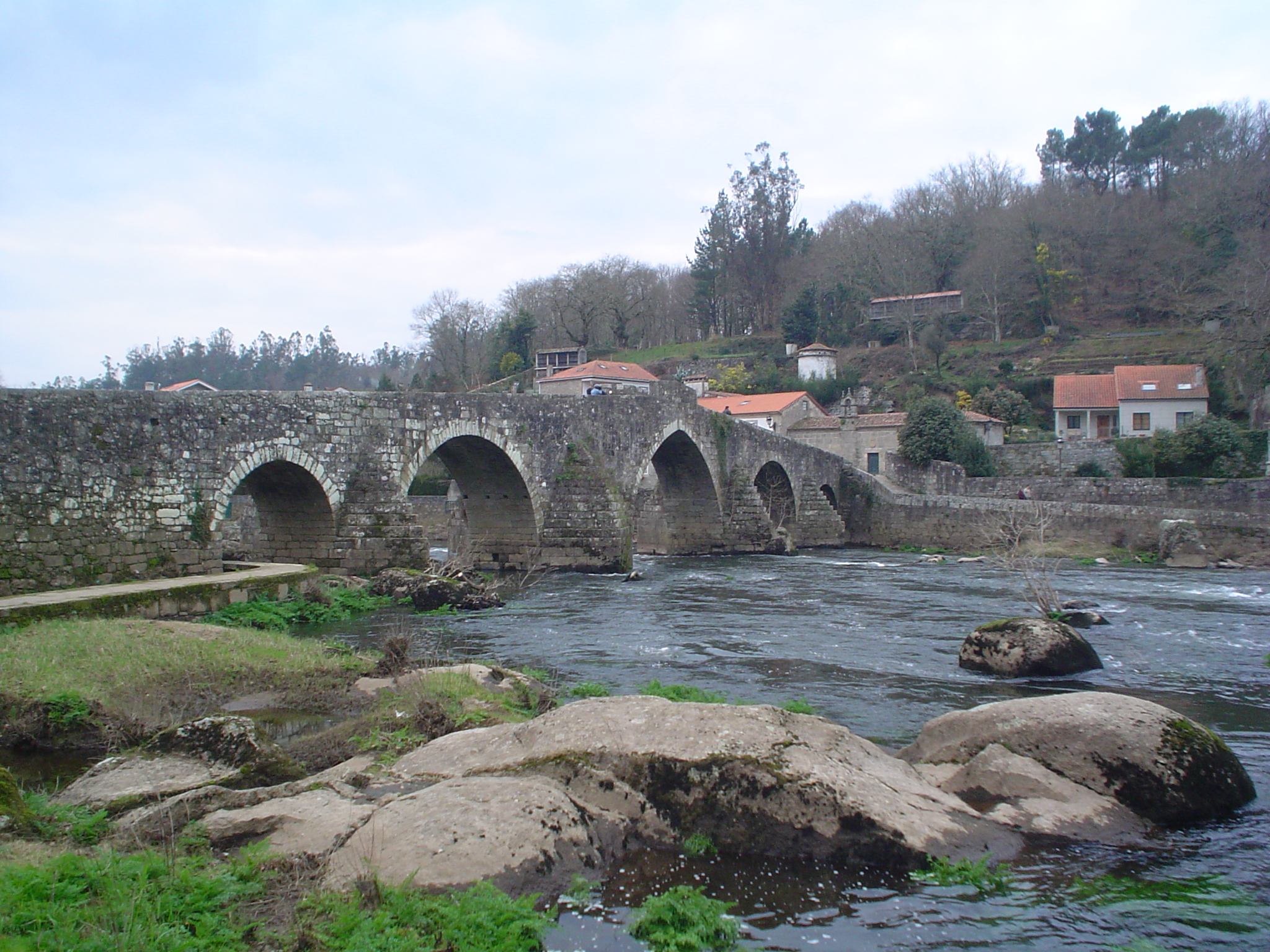
Ponte Maceira bridge

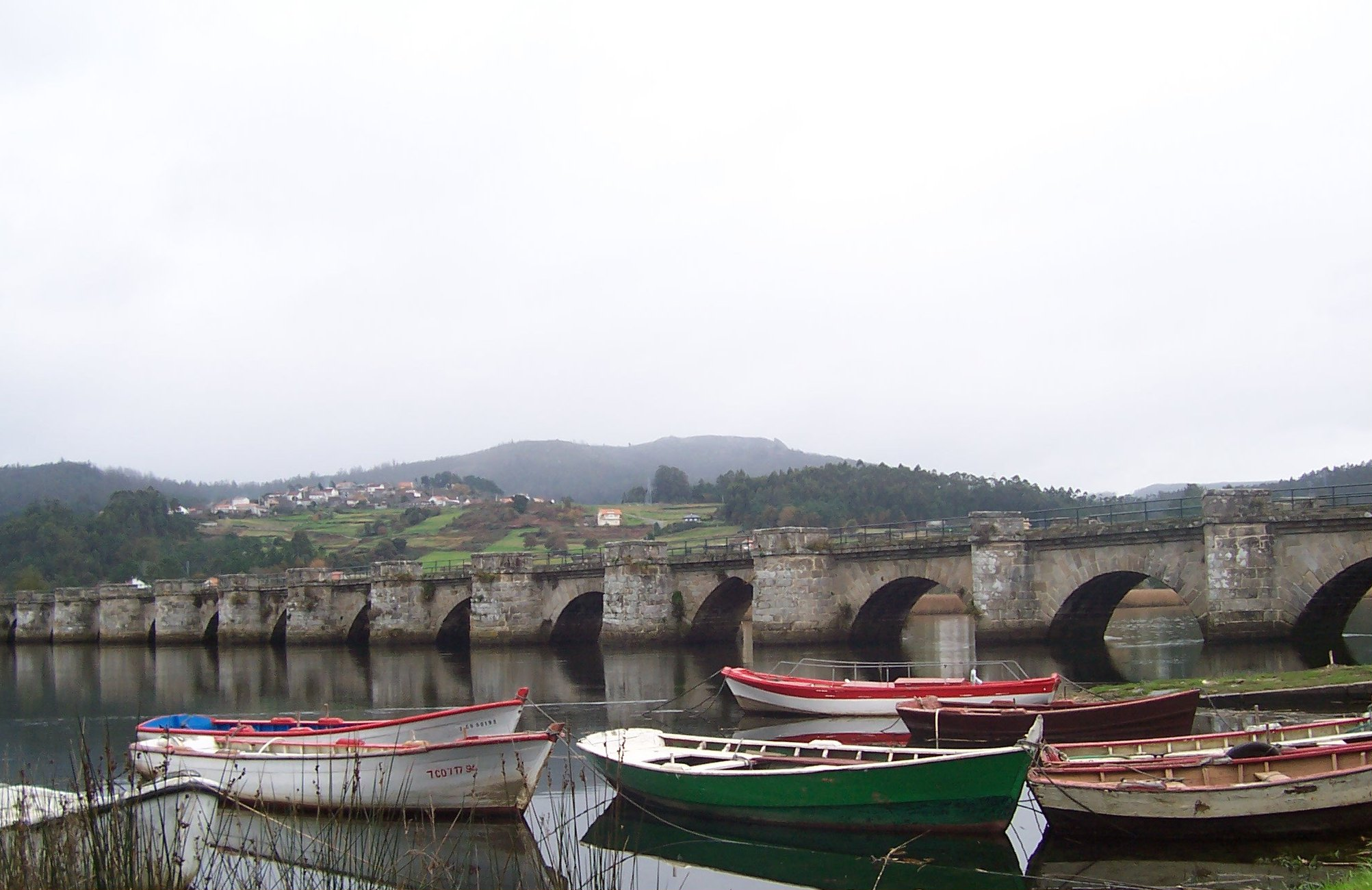
Ponte Nafonso bridge

== See also ==
- List of rivers of Spain
- Rivers of Galicia
