= Aiazo =

Village in Frades, Spain

Coordinates: 43.013°N 8.284°W

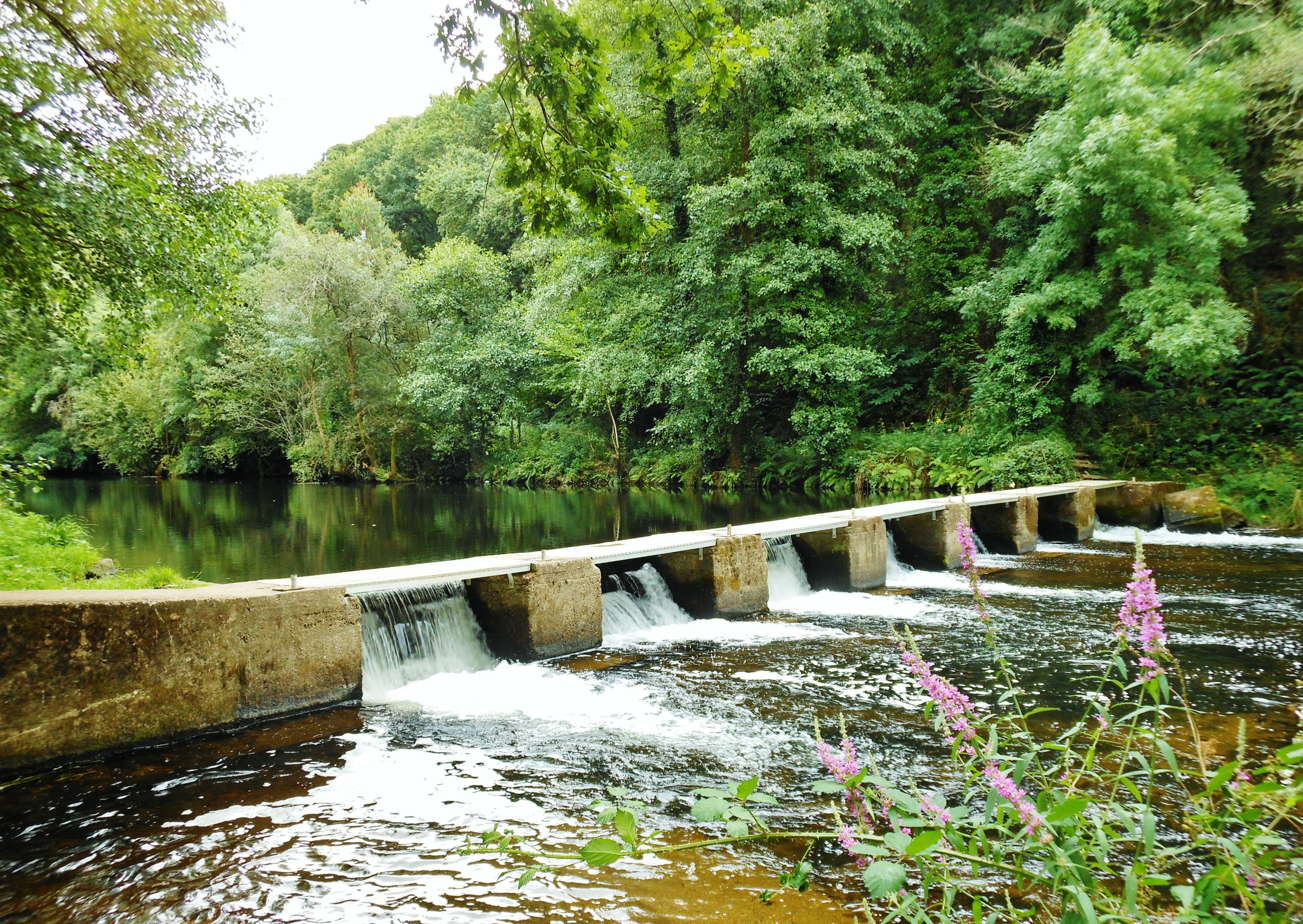
The Porto Aiazo bridge in Aiazo

San Pedro de Aiazo or simply Aiazo (Spanish: [aˈʝaθo]) is a village in the south of the municipality of Frades, in Galicia. According to the National Institute of Statistics of Spain (INE), in 2022 it had 152 inhabitants (86 men and 66 women) in three principal neighborhoods (Fontelo, Fonsá and A Devesa).

== Geography ==
Aiazo is placed in the south-west of the municipality of Frades (Ordes' shire), 30 km driving from Santiago de Compostela and 50 km driving from Coruña. By the south, Aiazo borders with the Arzúa's shire, by the Tambre river; by the north and the east it borders with the rest of Frades, and by the west with the municipality of Oroso. The relief, characterized by the Maruzo river (in the north) and Tambre river (in the south), over a geological area determined by the schist complex of Ordes, forms a landscape with soft hills. In Aiazo there are agrarian lands and forests around the populated areas. The forests are mostly of eucalyptus and pines in plantations, and Galician typical oak forest, with oaks, birchs, alders, willows, etc. Another frequent kind of forest in Aiazo is the riverbank forest near the Tambre, Gaiteiro, and Maruzo rivers. Maruzo's riverbank is part of the Río Tambre's ecological network Natura 2000, this protection will be increased in the future to the Tambre's riverbank. In the beginning, Aiazo's population was concentrated in the three principal neighborhoods, born around an aquifer. Historically Fontelo, Fonsá and A Devesa were the most important villages, the three with similar characteristics of terraced houses. To complement the three first settlements, country houses appeared, like Os Pereiros, in A Devesa, or O Casal, in Fontelo, and new settlements grew, like A Torre or A Carballeira. In the late 20th century, many isolated houses appeared, some of them following a ribbon development in the way between Ponte Carreira and Ordes, and other around the primary neighborhoods. Population ageing is a phenomenon occurring in Aiazo, although in recent years the tendency has been to receive immigrants, especially because of the 2008 crisis.

== Climate ==
The climate in Aiazo is oceanic, with frequent rain and soft temperatures, ca. 12 °C annual average. Winters are not very cold, but rainy. Nightly frosts are common, and the snow appears once a year, approximately. Summers are relative dry and warm.

== Demographics ==
Aiazo has the following neighborhoods :

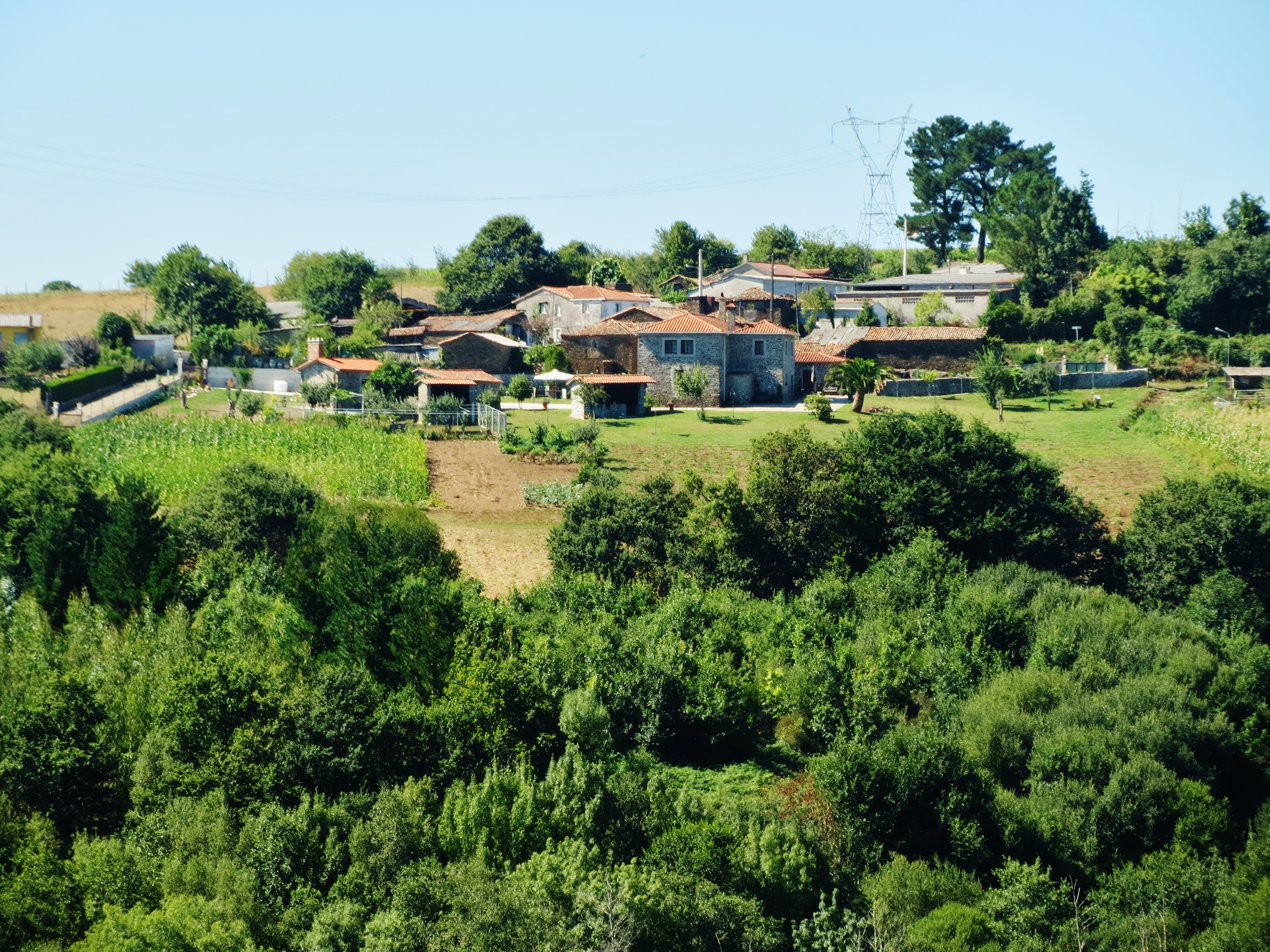
Fonsá and the Pazo of Mariñas

- Fontelo. Around an old and sinuous lane, many old big houses form this neighborhood.
- A Igrexa. Born around the Saint Peter's Church (igrexa de San Pedro, in Galician), six houses form this place. Aiazo's principal square is located just there, and on it, the neighbors celebrate some events.
- A Devesa. It is formed by many old houses, some of them restored.
- Fonsá. Old and new houses coexist here. There is a country mansion here, and a new residential area, too.
- A Carballeira. Is a residential area in the north of Fontelo.
- Galtar. Formed by four houses in Ghaltar Lane.
- Estrada. Is the area where the main street in Aiazo across the village.
- A Pedra. It is a private country houses and cowsheds complex.
- O Cadro. Two houses near A Pedra.
- Liñares. Three new houses in the north of Aiazo.
- A Torre. Five houses placed in a crossing, between Fontelo and Fonsá.

Fontelo and its contour is the most populated neighborhood in Aiazo, with 87 inhabitants (INE 2022), the second one by population is Fonsá and its contour, with 42 inhabitants and the last one by inhabitants is A Devesa and its contour with 23 inhabitants. In summer, Aiazo's population is increased because of tourists, so some days, Aiazo has 300 persons. This occurs because during all the 20th century, Aiazo was, like other Galician regions, an important emigration dot. So, nowadays there are little communities of people from Aiazo in cities like A Coruña or Vigo, in Galicia, in other cities of Spain and Europe like Barcelona (specially the municipality of Santa Coloma de Gramenet), Bilbao, Madrid, London, Aller, Zurich or Hamburg, and in other cities of the world like Buenos Aires. There are people from Aiazo in countries like France or Portugal, too. So in summer, many emigrated people and their descendants return to Aiazo to spend time in their houses, some of them remain empty the rest of the year.

== History ==
In Aiazo were found several ruins from the Castros Era, such as the dolmen of Aiazo, Neolithic megalithic tomb, one of the biggest and oldest in Galicia or such as the Medorras castro, a fortified settlement from the Iron Age, additionally, other ruins from indeterminate times were also found in Aiazo. Considering these findings, Aiazo territory has a very old settlement, more than 5,000 years old. Near Aiazo, an ancient Roman goldmine was found, so during the Roman Age, Aiazo was probably populated, too. Between 17th and 19th centuries, some mansions and big houses were built in Aiazo, such as a baroque house, still inhabited, in Fontelo, or Casa Fogueteiro, a big baroque house, in the past a mansion, abandoned in the late 20th century and nowadays just an old ruin.

During the 19th, Aiazo was incorporated to the new Frades municipality. A journey between Sobrado dos Monxes and Santiago de Compostela crossed Aiazo, a journey that was often transited by friars (in galician, "frades"), so this is the origin of the neighbor village name, Frades, which later became the name for the whole municipality. The journey lasted two days so friars had to sleep in Aiazo, the halfway point. The Fogueteiro mansion was, until the 19th century, an inn where the friars slept. In 1887 the San Pedro church was built: it is a small baroque building with just one nave and a lateral section for the sacristy, with ashlar and masonry corners.

During the 20th century, the way to Santiago lost its importance, especially because of the development of new vehicular roads. Aiazo became a common agrarian village that sent a big number of people to the emigration. During the 1950s Aiazo started the re-parcelling works, ended during the 1990s. This was the largest transformation of Aiazo's landscape in its history.

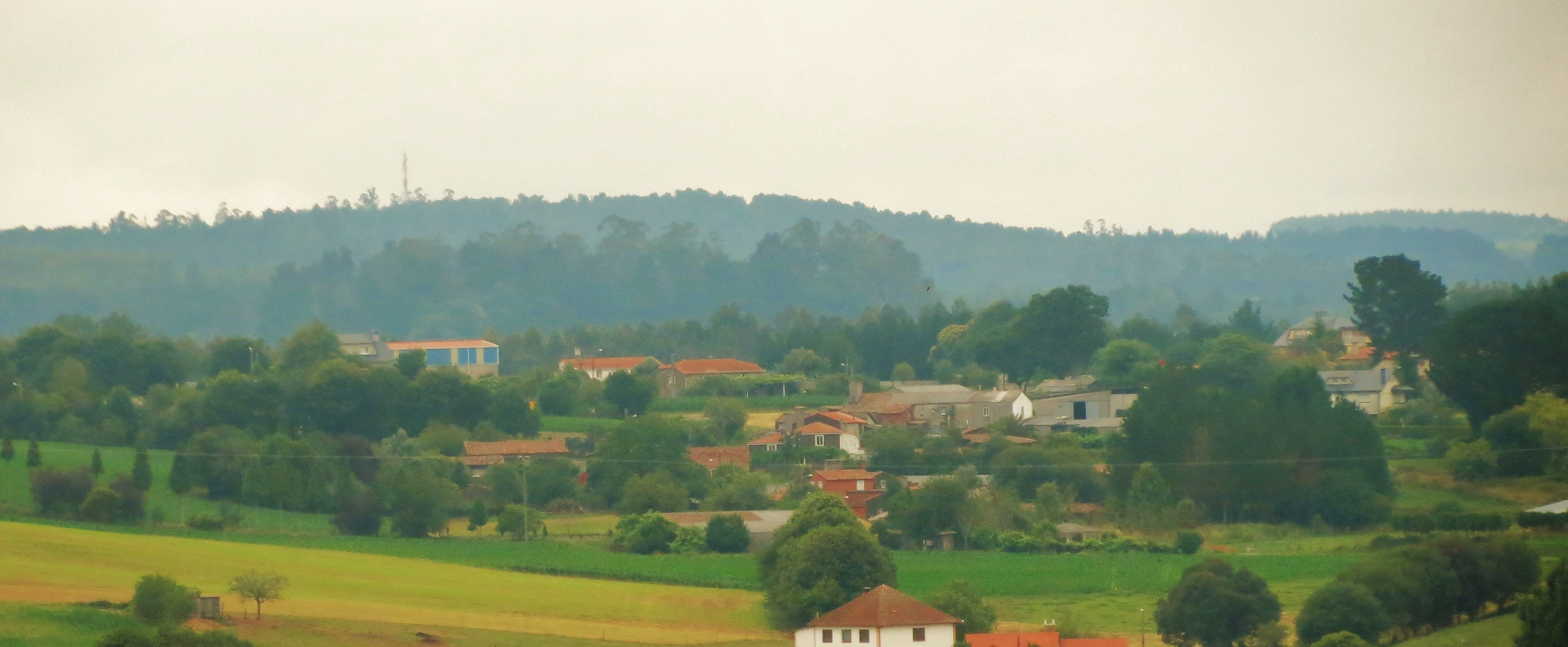
Landscape of Aiazo seen from the neighbor Tambre village

Since the 1980s, the social structure of Aiazo became different and as some people returned from the emigration, they built new houses. By this time the Asociación de Veciños de Aiazo, (lately Asociación de Veciños Os Pasos de Aiazo) –a neighborhood association became very important. This group of people improved Aiazo social life in an extraordinary way. A historic day in Aiazo is 23 July, since in this day of 1994 the Os Pasos de Aiazo recreational area was set up by this association. Os Pasos became so important that Aiazo celebrated different events by using this space, highlighting the Festa dos Pasos (Os Pasos Festival), since 1994, or the Ruta de Senderismo day (a hiking event) since 1998. In January 2005 Aiazo celebrated the first edition of the Festa da Merenda (Merenda Festival), devised by some influential women in the neighborhood association, that quickly became the most important gastronomic festival in Frades and one of the most important in all Galicia, exceeding 8,000 visitors at the 2015 edition.

== Tourism ==
Aiazo has three interesting places for visitors:

- A dolmen found in the 1990s, demolished and placed in the Trasgaltar woods. Its destruction and abandonment was denounced by some collectives like the Associaçom Cultural Obradoiro da História, who reported the importance of the archeological site to the community.
- A hiking route next to the Tambre river, communicated with other Frades villages.
- A recreational area next to the Tambre River, very popular during the summer. Called Os Pasos was set up in 1994. Aiazo celebrates a festival every year in commemoration of its establishment. Since 1994 Os Pasos was improved until it became a symbol of identity for Aiazo and Frades people and an important leisure point for many people in the Santiago de Compostela urban area.

Other interesting places in Aiazo are the Peneda da Hedra, a cave where a shoemaker lived, or the different mills in the Maruzo river, some of them well preserved, like the Mestas mill.

== Economy ==
Aiazo is a residential area characterized by the commuting to A Coruña, Santiago and other Galician towns such as Ordes. Agrarian activities in Aiazo are not as important as in other Frades areas, however A Pedra livestock is an exception here. Aiazo is the home of some SMEs of the service sector and of one of the biggest forestry companies in Spain named Eucalyptus Plus SL.

== Festivals and culture ==
Aiazo celebrates many religious, cultural and gastronomic festivals. Highlights:

- Merenda Festival; gastronomic (Festa da Merenda). Every Holy Week, volunteer neighbors cook merendas, a typical Aiazo's pancake. People can taste it for free while enjoying traditional music and, in the evening, a band plays until dawn. This is the most important event in Aiazo and in the whole of Frades.
- San Pedro; religious annual party, celebrated in June.
- Os Pasos Festival; celebrated once a year, a Saturday near 23 July; Aiazo's neighbors hold a lunch.
- A Ruta; Every year in the first week of August, the Aiazo community goes hiking with other people to discover the Aiazo forests and then they enjoy a barbecue and popular games in Os Pasos.
- San Roque; an annual religious party celebrated in August.
- Magosto; fall gastronomic festival. Volunteer neighbors cook typical autumn products and people taste it for free in the Aiazo Civic Centre (placed in A Carballeira).

== Sarillo de Aiazo ==
Sarillo de Aiazo is Aiazo's Galician folk music group. There are 20 musicians of various ages.

== See also ==
Aiazo in Openstreetmap
