= Trastámara =

Trastámara may refer to:

- the land "beyond (north of) the Tambre" (tras Támara) in medieval Galicia
- Count of Trastámara, a medieval title of nobility
- House of Trastámara, a late medieval Spanish dynasty
