= Cerceda =

- Municipality
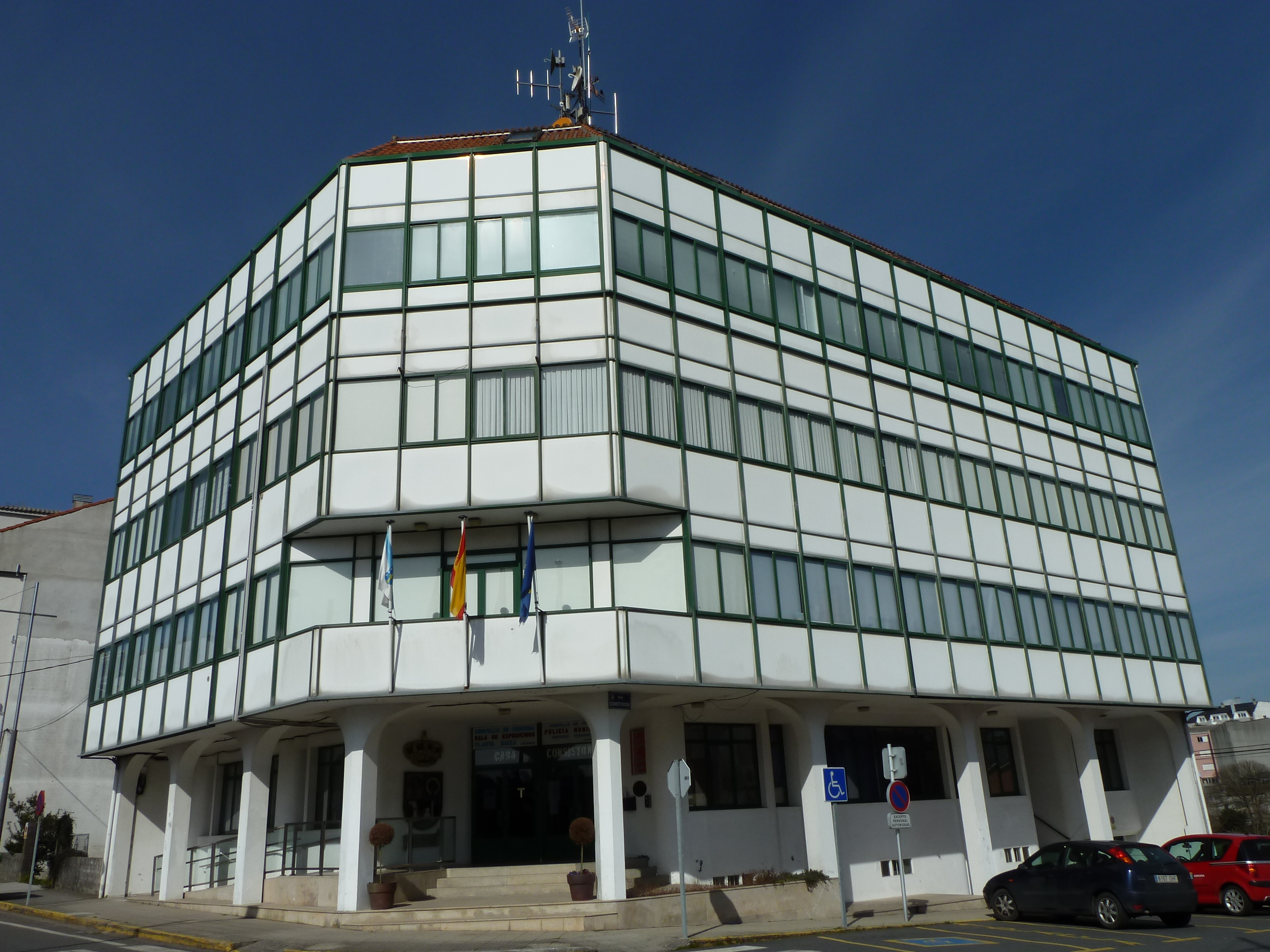

- Coat of arms

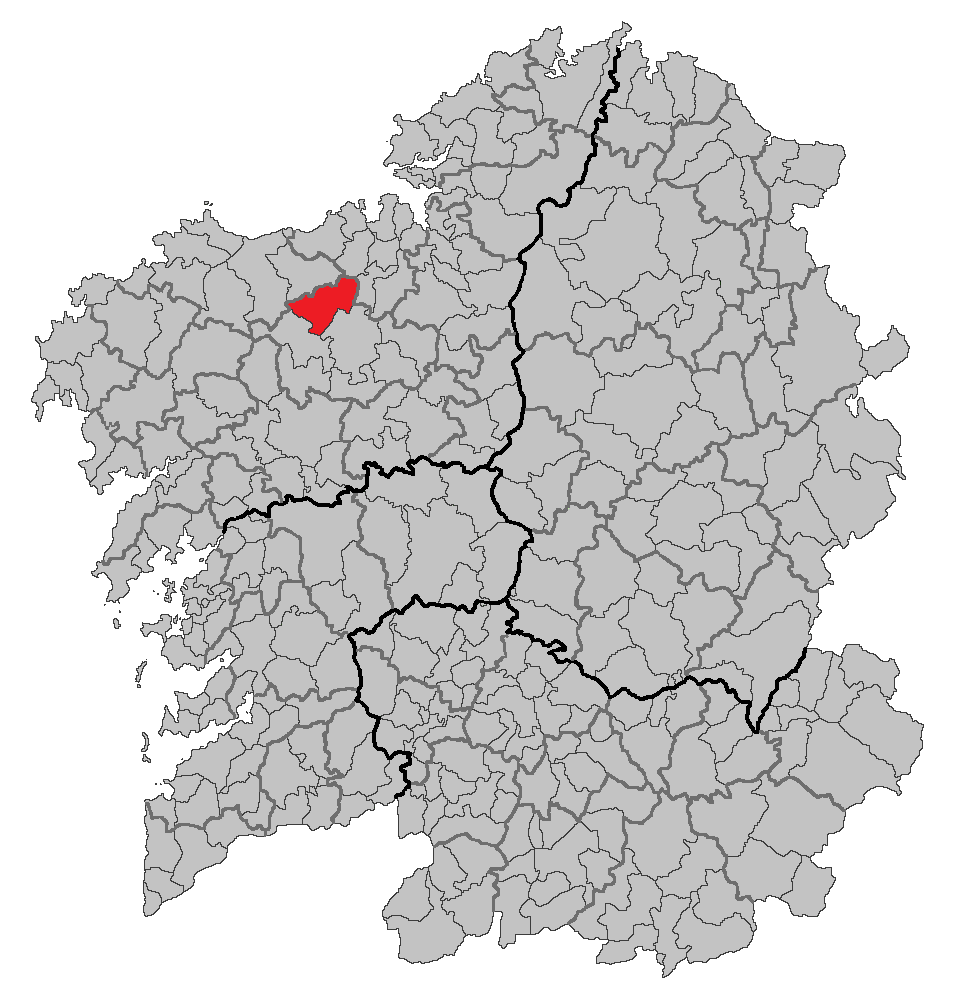
- Location of Cerceda

- Location in Spain
- Coordinates: 43°11′19″N 8°28′13″W
- Country: Spain
- Autonomous community: Galicia
- Province: A Coruña
- Comarca: Ordes (region)

Area
  - Total: 111.27 km^{2} (42.96 sq mi)

Population (2025-01-01)
  - Total: 5,116
  - Density: 45.98/km^{2} (119.1/sq mi)
- Demonym: Cercedense
- Time zone: UTC+1 (CET)
  - Summer (DST): UTC+2 (CEST)
- Postal code: 15185
- Dialing code: 981
- Website: Official website

Cerceda is a municipality of northwestern Spain in the province of A Coruña, in the autonomous community of Galicia. It belongs to the comarca of Ordes. It has a population of 5,597 inhabitants (INE, 2008).

== See also ==
List of municipalities in A Coruña
