= Ordes (comarca) =

Coordinates: 43.05°N 8.4°W

- Comarca
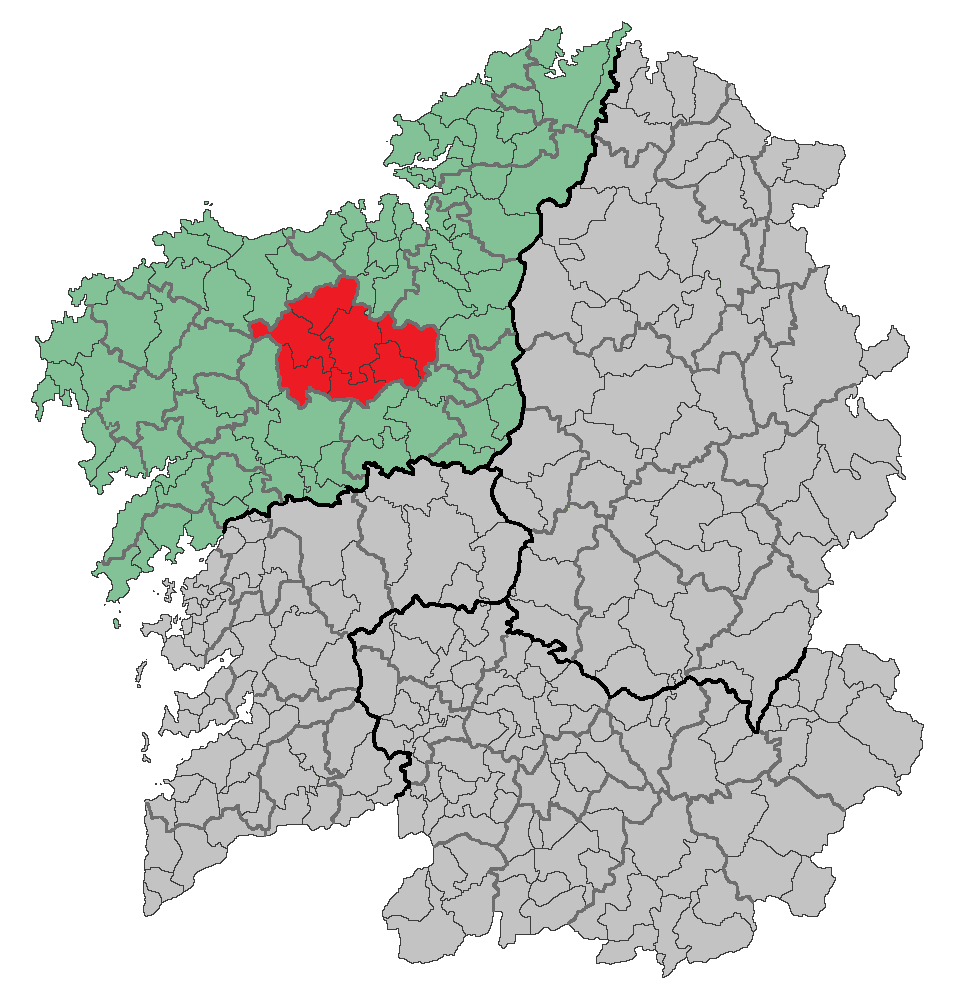
- Country: Spain
- Autonomous community: Galicia
- Province: A Coruña
- Capital: Ordes
- Municipalities: List: Cerceda, Frades, Mesía, Ordes, Oroso, Tordoia, Trazo

Area
  - Total: 753.0 km^{2} (290.7 sq mi)

Population
  - Total: 12,589
  - Density: 16.72/km^{2} (43.30/sq mi)
- Demonym: Ordense
- Time zone: UTC+1 (CET)
  - Summer (DST): UTC+2 (CEST)

Ordes is a comarca in the Galician Province of A Coruña. The total population of this local region is 12,589 (2022) and it has a surface area of 753 km^{2} (291 sq mi).

== Municipalities ==
Cerceda, Frades, Mesía, Ordes, Oroso, Tordoia and Trazo.
