= Dios Ke Te Crew =

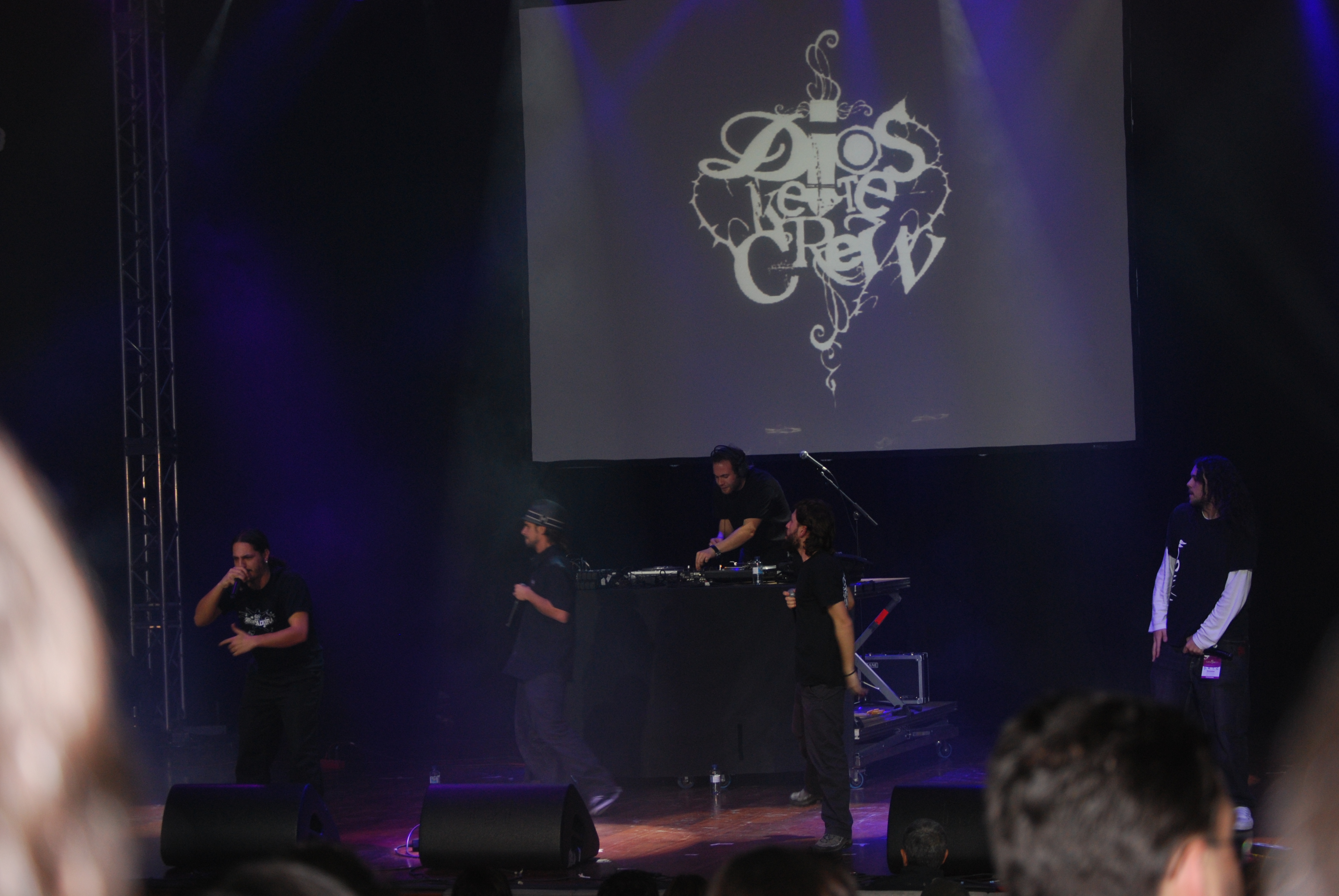

Background information
- Origin: Ordes, Galiza
- Genres: Hip hop Political hip hop
- Years active: 2003–present
- Members: García Mc (2003-2016) Sokram; Mou; Jamas; DJ Murdock

Dios Ke Te Crew (a satiric misspelling of the Galician phrase "Deus que te criou!") is a Rap music group formed in 2003 in Ordes, Galiza. Its members are DJ Murdock, Sokram, Mou and Jamas. Their songs are performed in Galician language. Later they also formed a group of graffiti and breakdance. All these aspects of hip hop come together in live performances of the group, where it is common to witness the painting of graffiti in the background of the stage and breakdance, while the band plays its songs. Their lyrics tend to be heavily political, criticizing things like capitalism, the Guardia Civil, the Spanish monarchy, the discrimination of the Galician language or corruption.

== History ==
The group began in 2003 when the hip-hop groups Ghamberros and 5 Talegos, both from Ordes, formed Dios Ke Te Crew (DKTC). On the non-musical part they were joined by the Vandals Crew, Cousas Novas (both Graffiti artists crews) and the breakers Compostela Playmovil Kids (which no longer form part of the crew).

The first recording of DKTC was part of the soundtrack of the documentary Hai que Botalos ("We have to kick them out"), a documentary against the People's Party of Galicia government. The song was Herdeiros da Ditadura, about the historical and present repression and mistreatment of the Galician language. The song became quite popular, and was even played in demonstrations that year.

In 2006, DKTC released their first job in a professional format, an LP titled Xénese with 16 tracks. Self-released by the label's own group DKTC Sons and the publisher Falcatruada. This is the first rap album made entirely in Galician language, achieving a remarkable success of public. Xénese has influences of jazz, rock, reggae, funk and hardcore punk.

In their performances throughout Spain, DKTC has shared the stage with artists like Saian Supa Crew, The Beanuts, Dealema, Foreign Beggars, Ojos de Brujo, La Mala Rodríguez, SFDK, Violadores del Verso, Sólo los Solo or La Excepción.

In 2011 DKTC released a new LP, Humanose.

== Collaborations with other groups ==
- Ninguén (2006), with the folk group A Quenlla.
- Coas tuas mans (2010), with the rock group Nao.
- Sempre Adiante (2011), with the rock group Ruxe Ruxe.

== Members ==
- DJ Murdock
- Sokram (MC)
- Mou (MC)
- Jamas (MC)
- García Mc (2003-2016)

== Discography ==
- 2006: Xénese (LP)
- 2009: Chove (Maxi Single)
- 2011: Humanose (LP)
- 2013: Dez (Maxi Single)
- 2019: O Ciclo da Serpe (LP)
