= Mesía Castle =

Ruined castle in Galicia, Spain

Coordinates: 43°07′05″N 8°14′34″W

Castillo de Mesía
- Mesía in Spain
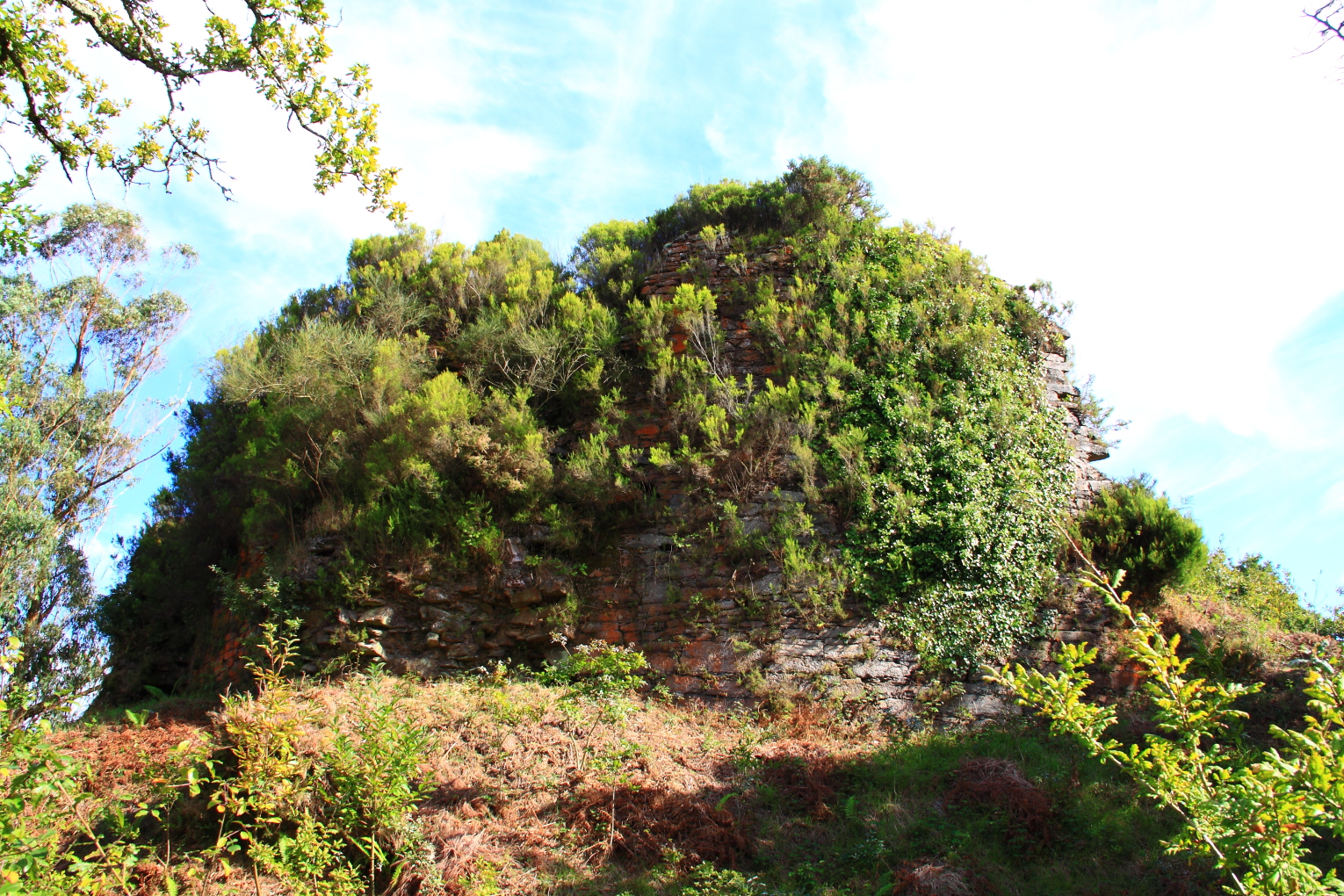
- Ruins of the castle today.

Site information
- Type: Community
- Owner: Ministry of Culture
- Condition: Ruins

Location
- Height: 18 meters

Site history
- Built: Late 13th or early 14th century

The fortress-tower of Mesía is a fortification dating from the late 13th or early 14th century, located in the village of Pobra, in the Galician municipality of Mesía. Since the 15th century, during the Ancien Régime, the jurisdiction of Mesía for the bishop of Santiago de Compostela was exercised from this castle. It was declared a Bien de Interés Cultural on November 17, 1994, by the Ministry of Culture.

== Description ==
The castle consisted of an inner walled tower, with exterior polygonal defenses, surrounded by a deep moat. Its current state of preservation is one of abandonment, and only part of the exterior defenses remains, which are rounded and reach a height of 18 meters at some points. The keep was much taller than the walls and likely had battlements.

== History ==
The earliest historical records mentioning the castle date back to 1401, in a document by Gonzalo Díaz de Mesía, lord of this jurisdiction. Its name appears in an inscription that was on a lintel above the gate of the keep:

ESTA CASA FEZO D. GONZLAVO (Gonzalvo) DÍAZ DE MESÍA E SUA MOLER M(María) PRES (Peres)

Much of the castle was destroyed in 1467 during the Irmandiño Revolts, but upon being abandoned by them, Alonso II de Fonseca usurped ownership and restored it. In 1858, the construction was still intact, but two years later, the poet Ángel Corzo, in a personal letter, remarked:

Two days ago I was in Mesía, I wanted to visit its ancient castle, and I found it destroyed by the pickaxe and the hoe of man.

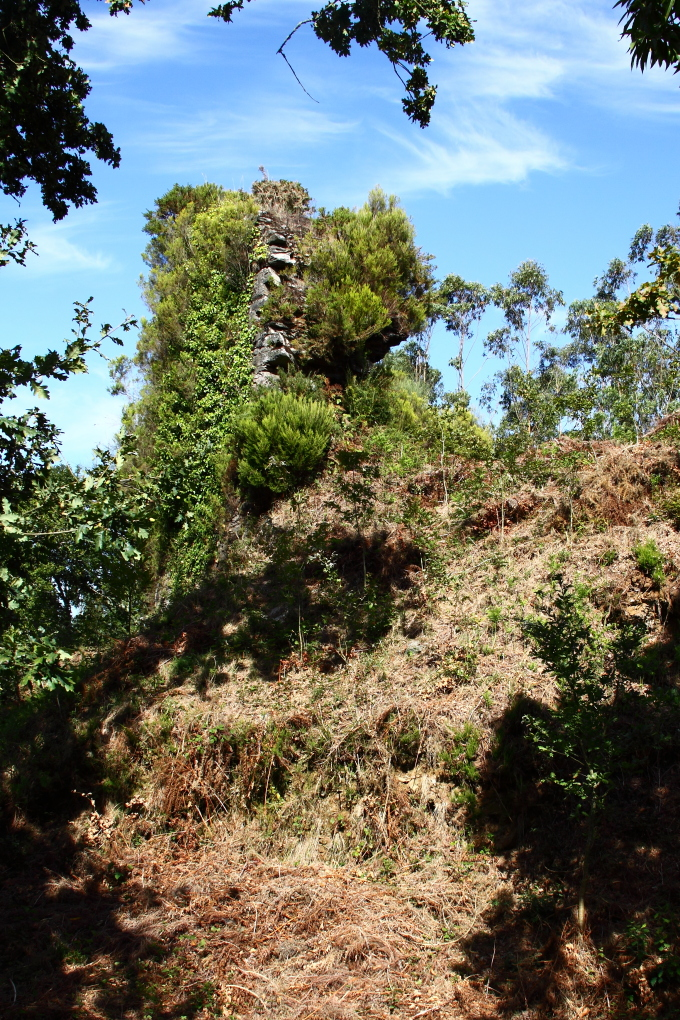

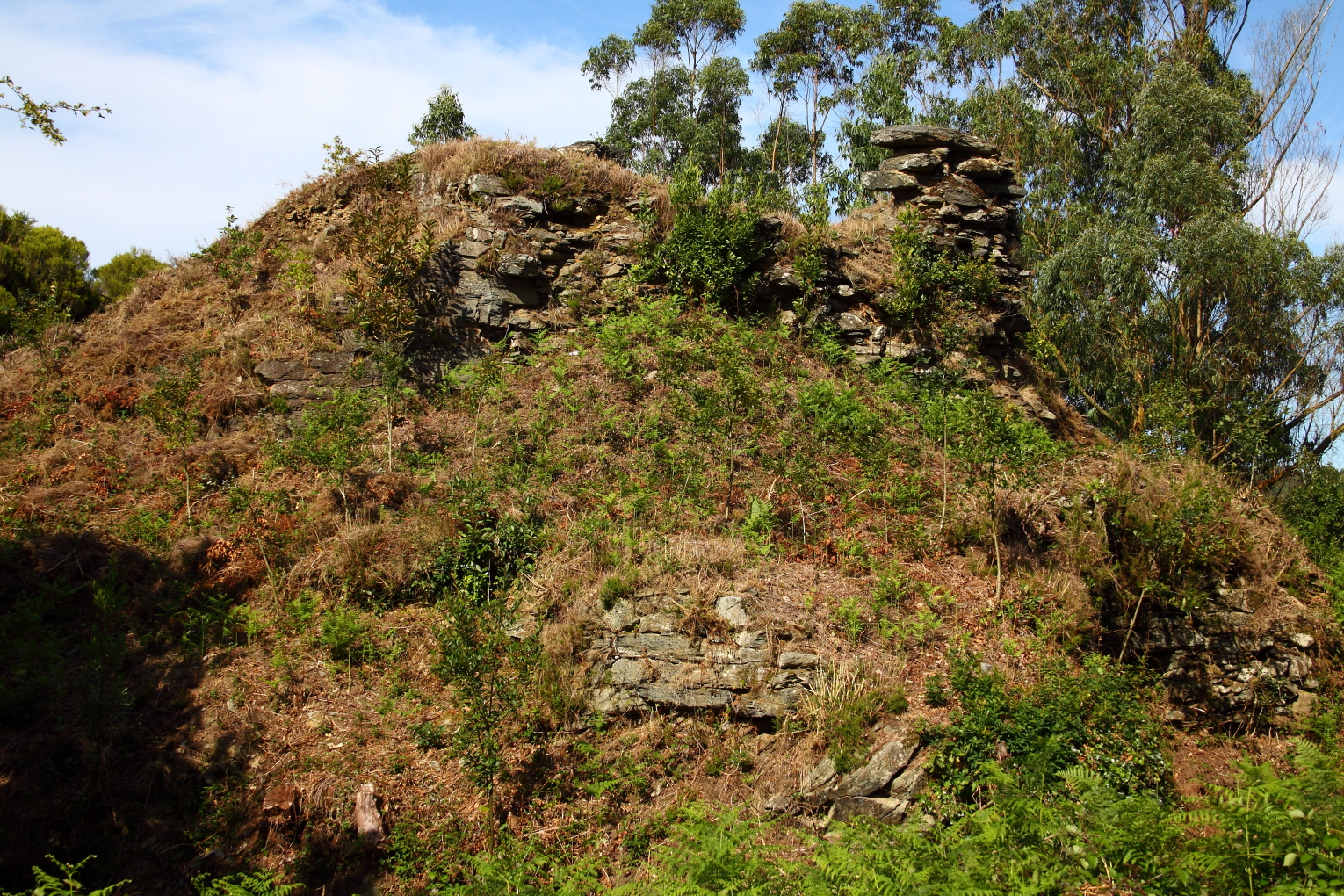

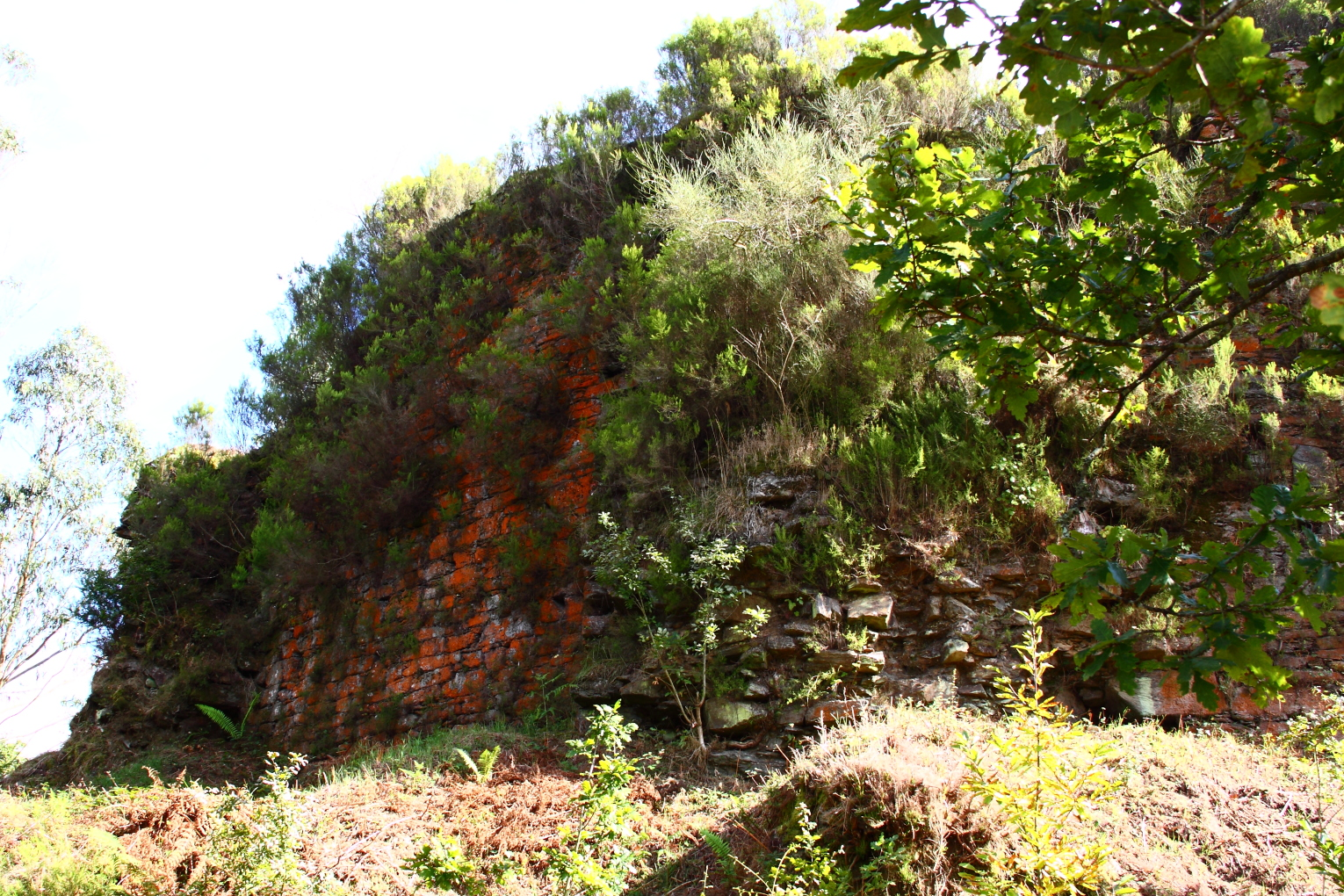

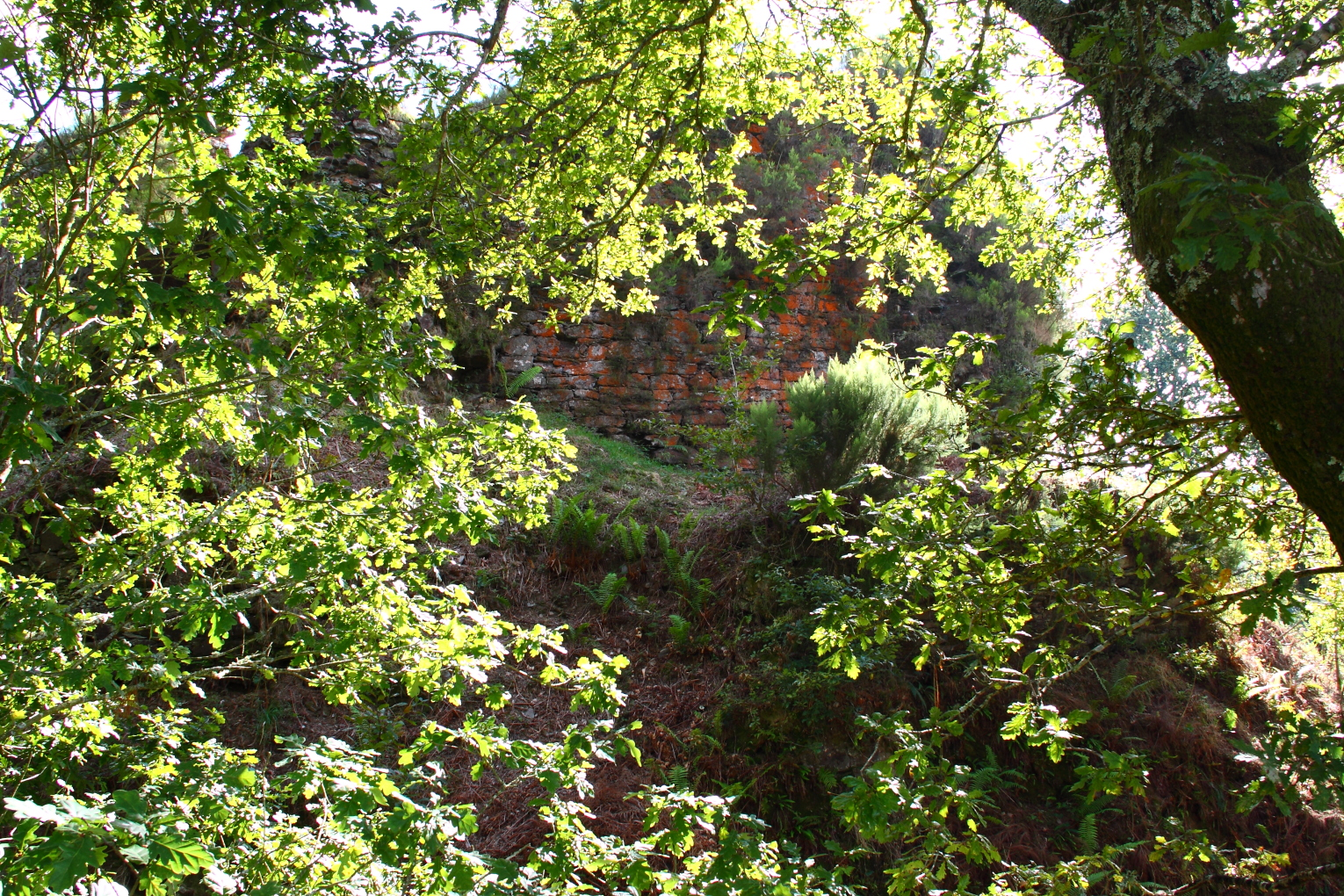
