= Trazo =

Coordinates: 43°01′N 8°32′W

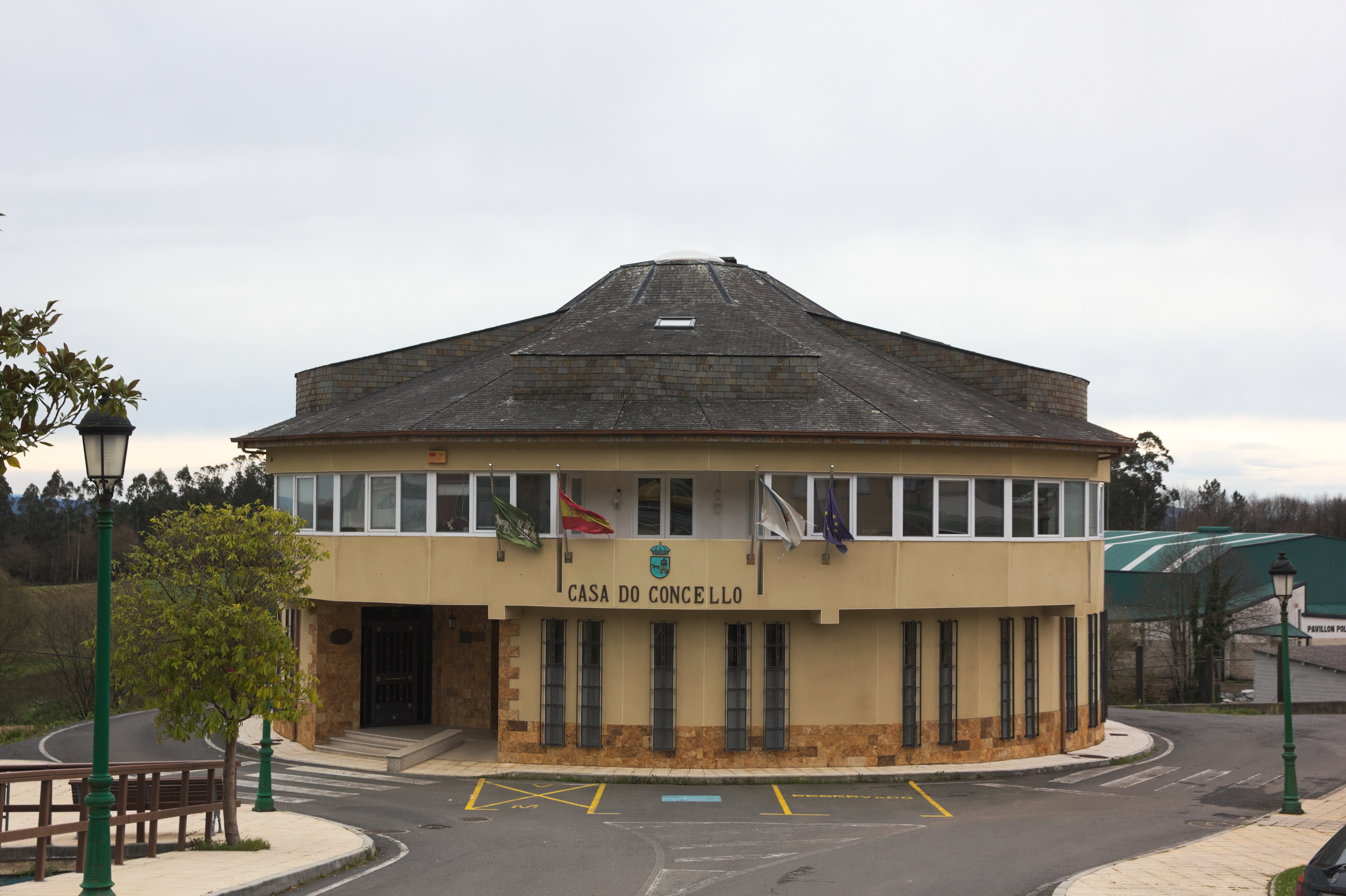
- Town hall.

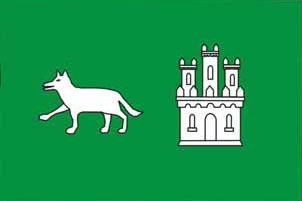
- Flag Coat of arms

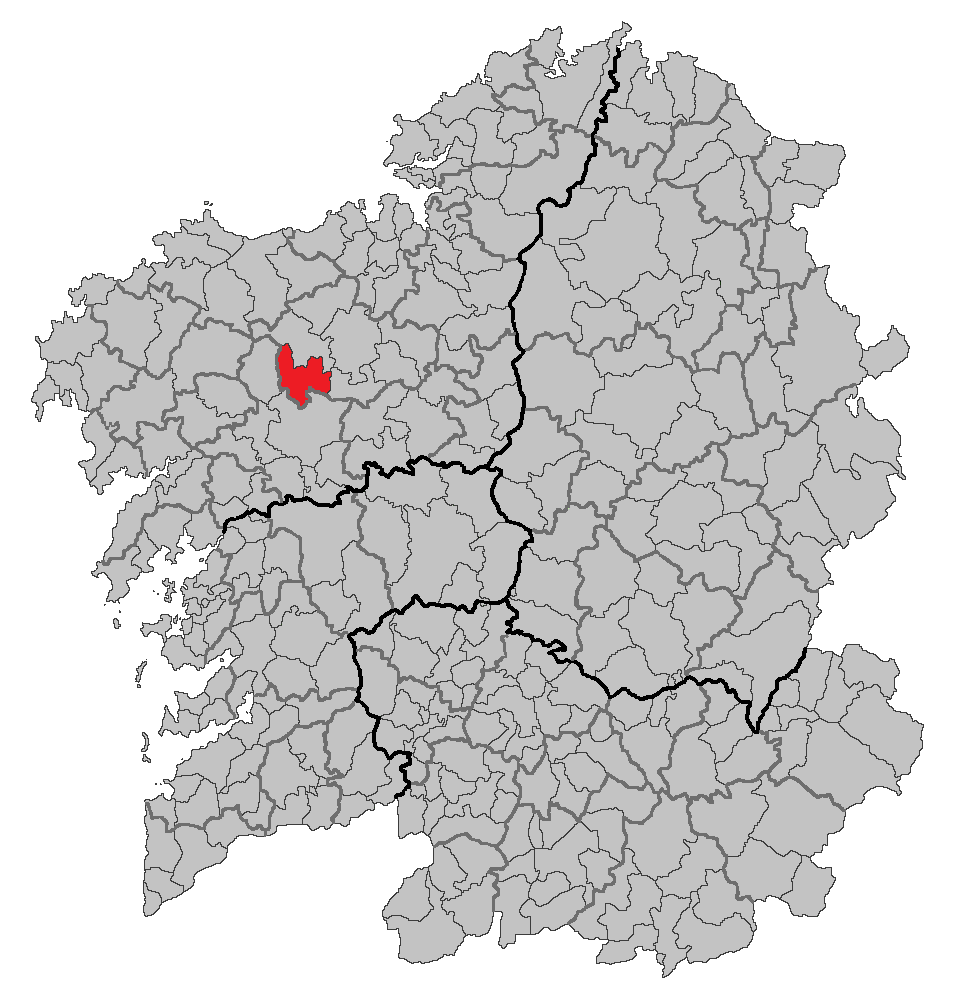
- Location of Trazo within Galicia

Area
  - Total: 101.82 km^{2} (39.31 sq mi)

Population (2025-01-01)
  - Total: 2,986
  - Density: 29.33/km^{2} (75.95/sq mi)
- Time zone: UTC+1 (CET)
  - Summer (DST): UTC+2 (CEST)

Trazo is a municipality in the province of A Coruña, in the autonomous community of Galicia, Spain. It is located in the comarca of Ordes.

The Tambre River on the south serves as a boundary with the Santiago de Compostela municipality.

== See also ==
List of municipalities in A Coruña
