= Mesía =

Municipality in Galicia, Spain

Coordinates: 43°06′00″N 8°16′00″W

- Municipality
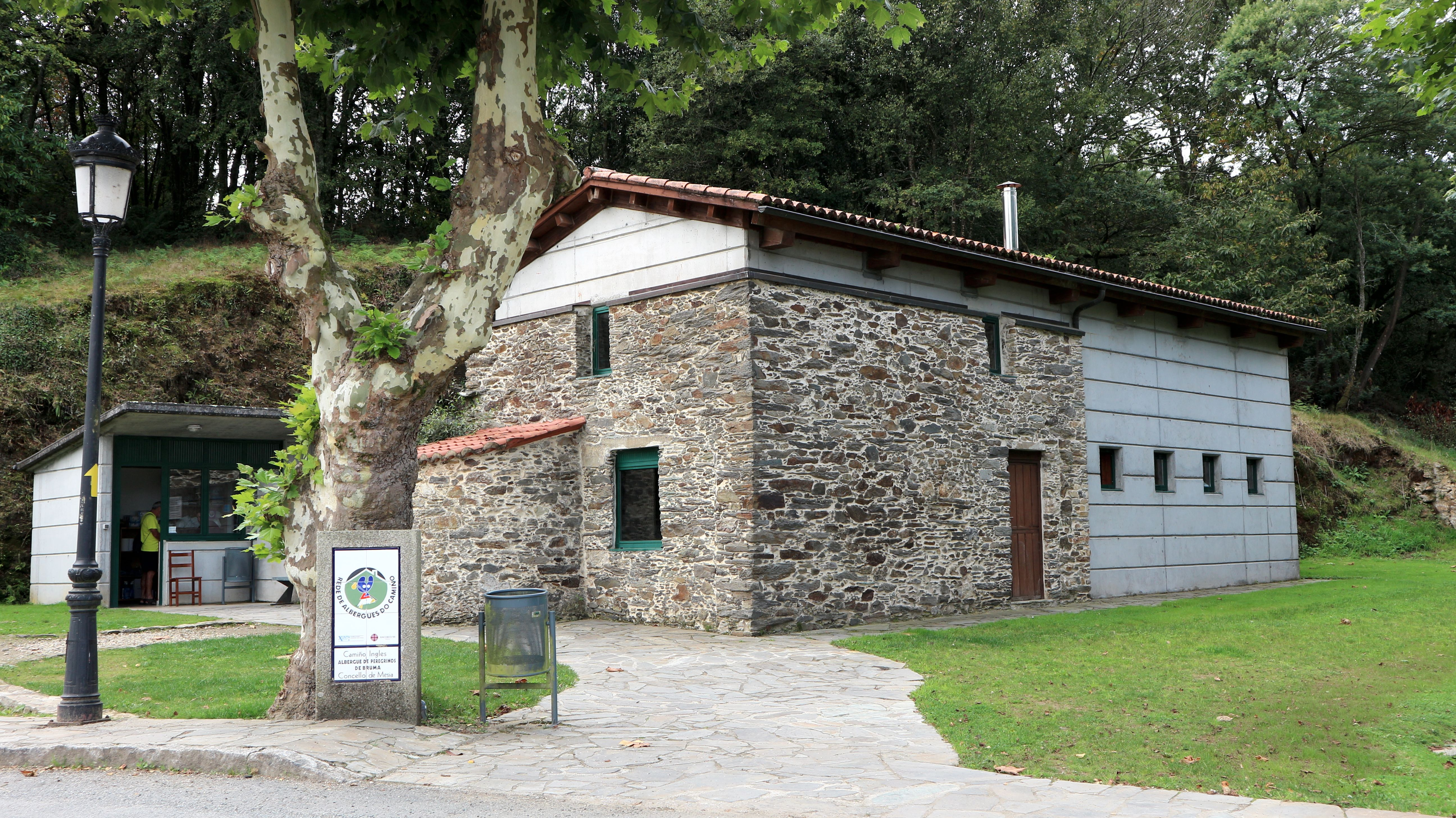

- Coat of arms

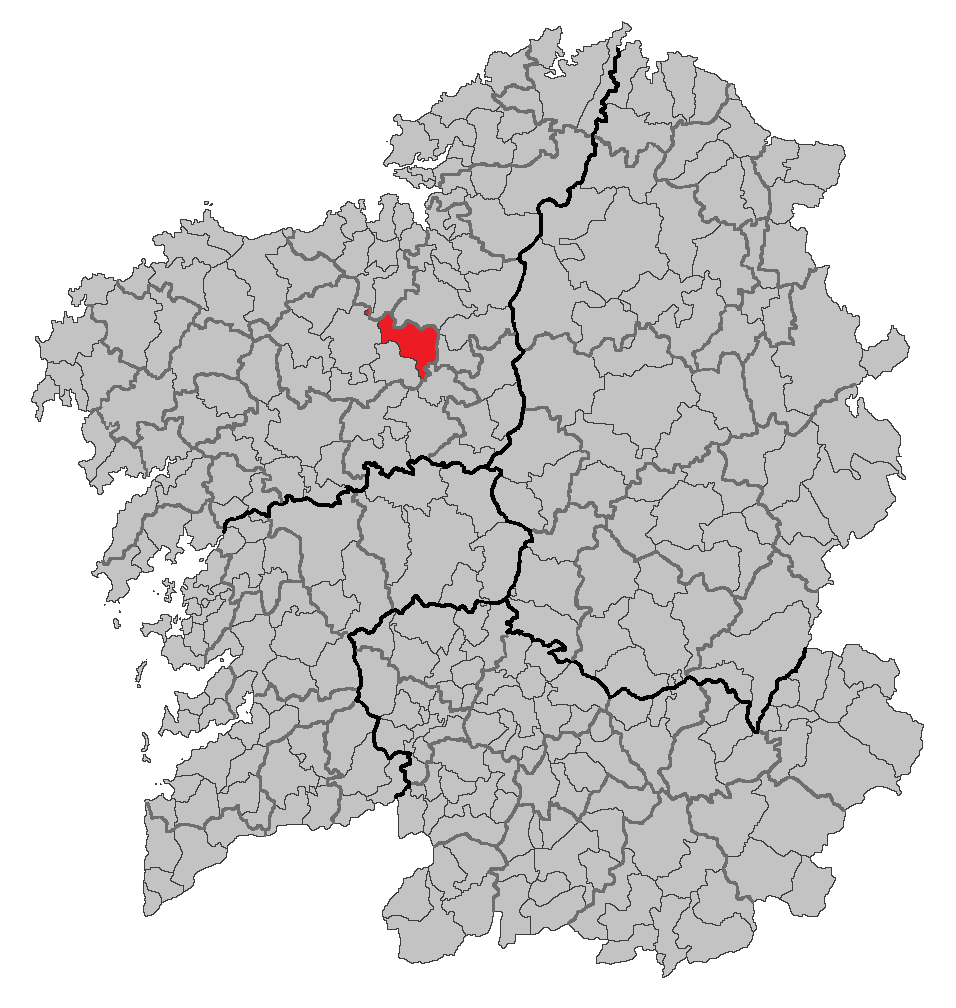
- Location of Mesía

- Location in Spain
- Country: Spain
- Autonomous community: Galicia
- Province: A Coruña
- Comarca: Ordes

Government
  - Alcalde: Mariano Iglesias
- Demonym: Mesiense
- Time zone: UTC+1 (CET)
  - Summer (DST): UTC+2 (CEST)
- Postal code: 15685
- Website: Official website

Mesía is a municipality in the province of A Coruña, in Galicia, northwestern Spain. It is part of the comarca of Ordes. It has a population of 2,922 (Spanish 2011 Census) and an area of 107 km^{2}. It contains the ruined mediaeval castle Castillo de Mesía.

== Civil parishes ==
- Albixoi (Santa María)
- Bascoi (Santiago)
- Boado (Santiago)
- Bruma (San Lorenzo)
- Cabrui (San Martín)
- Castro (San Sebastián)
- Cumbraos (Santa María)
- Lanzá (San Mamed)
- Mesía (San Cristóbal)
- Olas (San Lorenzo)
- Visantoña (San Martín)
- Xanceda (San Salvador)

== See also ==
List of municipalities in A Coruña
