= Frades, A Coruña =

Frades
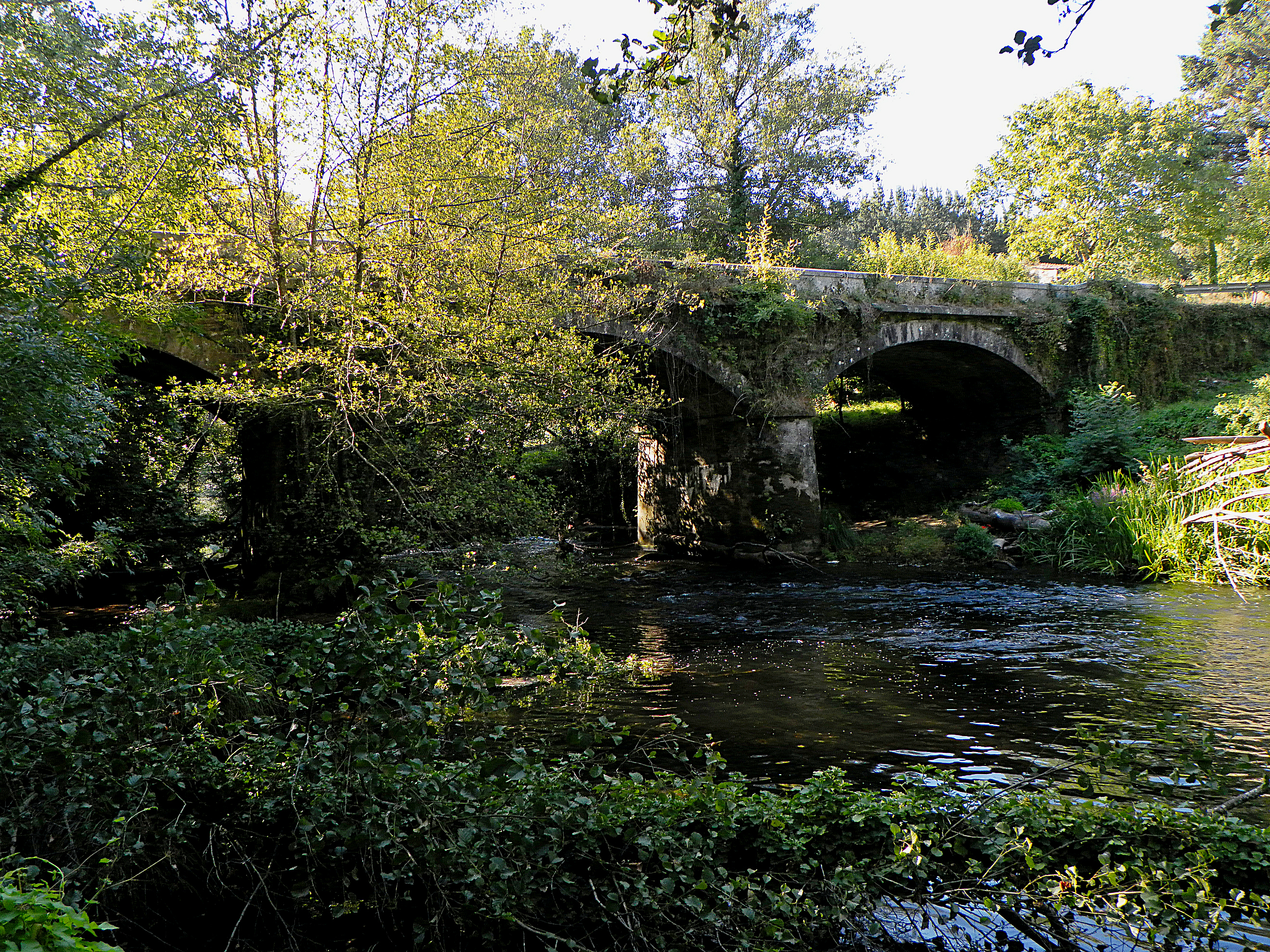
- Roman bridge in Gafoi, Frades.

- Coat of arms

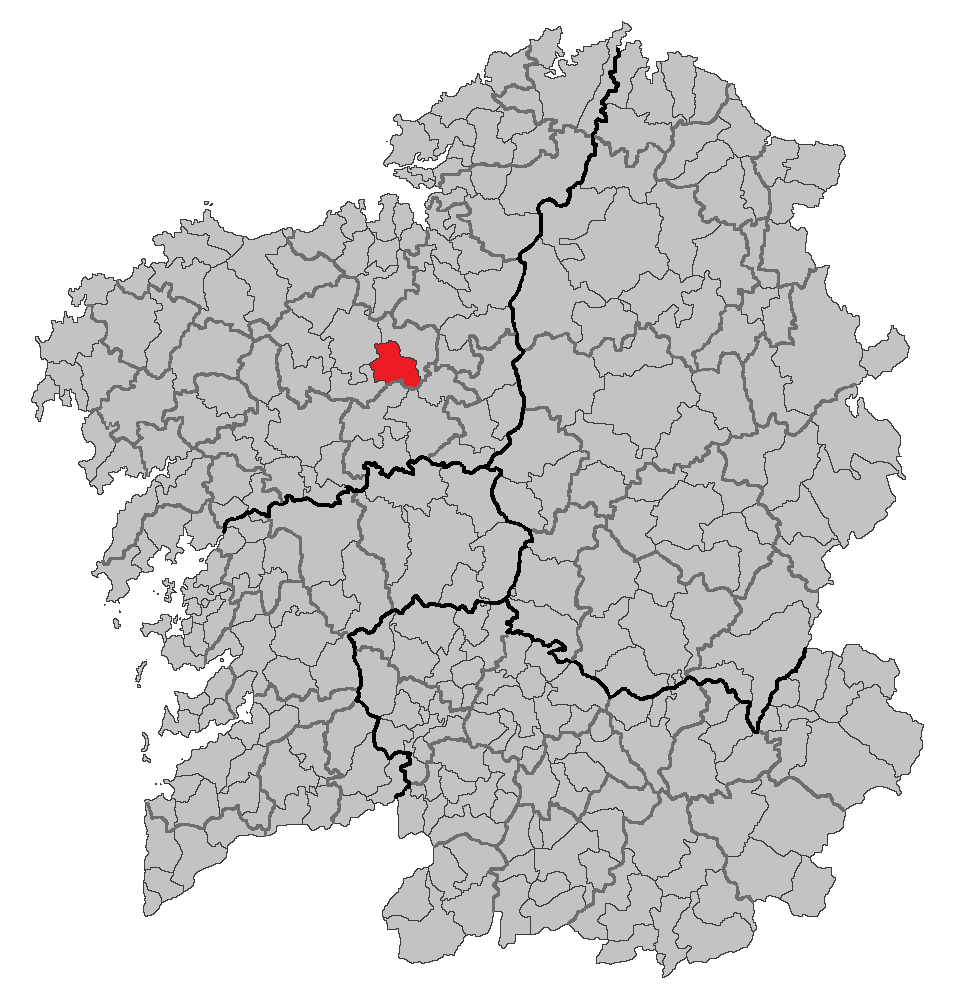
- Location of Frades within Galicia
- Coordinates: 43°2′24″N 8°16′38″W
- Country: Spain
- Autonomous community: Galicia
- Province: A Coruña
- Comarca: Ordes

Area
  - Total: 81.61 km^{2} (31.51 sq mi)

Population (2025-01-01)
  - Total: 2,117
  - Density: 25.94/km^{2} (67.19/sq mi)
- Time zone: UTC+1 (CET)
  - Summer (DST): UTC+2 (CEST)
- Website: https://frades.gal/

Frades is a municipality in the province of A Coruña, in the autonomous community of Galicia, northwestern Spain. It belongs to the comarca of Ordes. Frades is situated in the central zone of the province. One of the most popular sites in Frades is the Aiazo village and its parklands next to the Tambre river.

== See also ==
List of municipalities in A Coruña
