= Tordoia =

Coordinates: 43.088°N 8.560°W

- Municipality
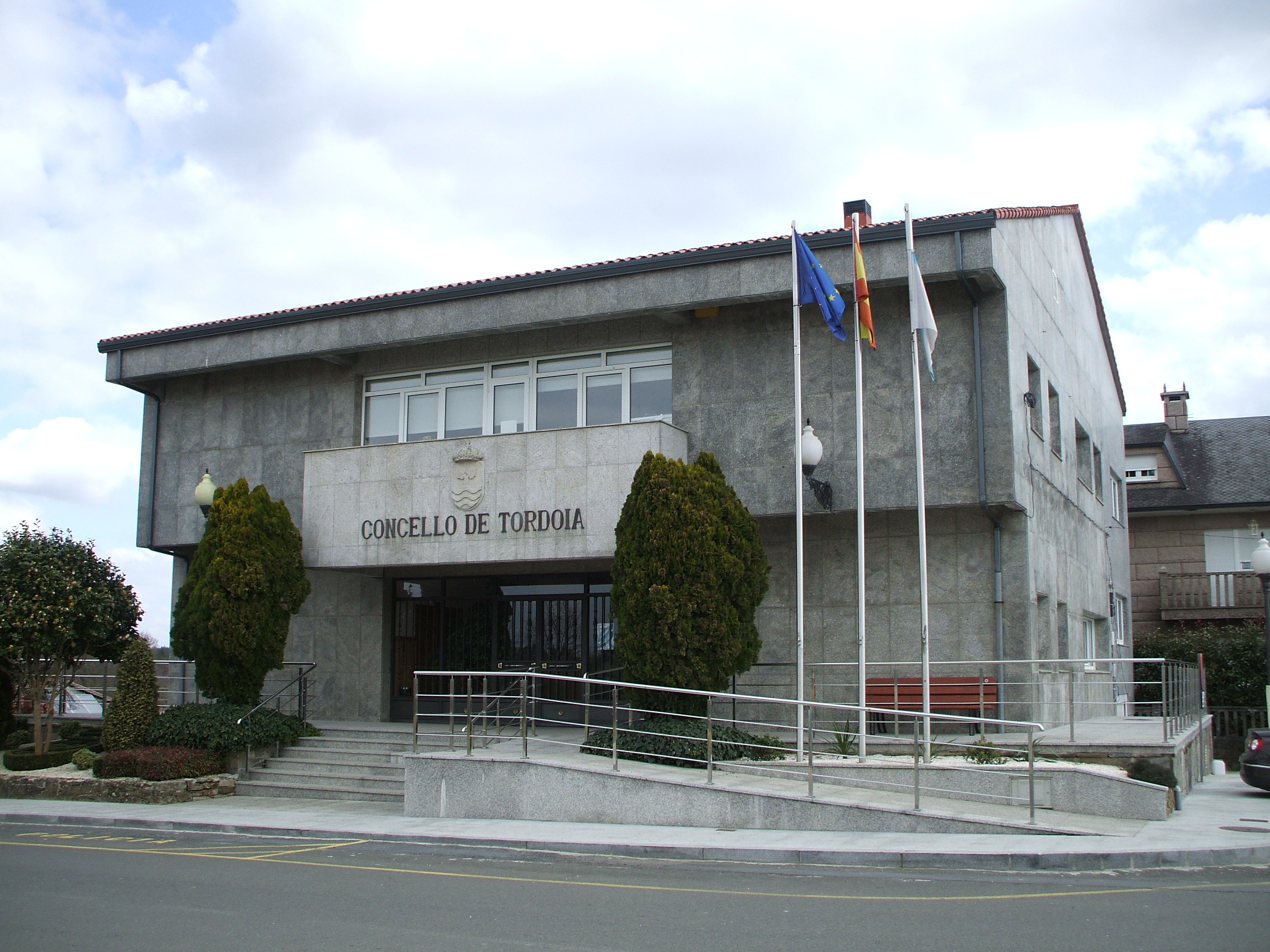
- Town hall

- Coat of arms

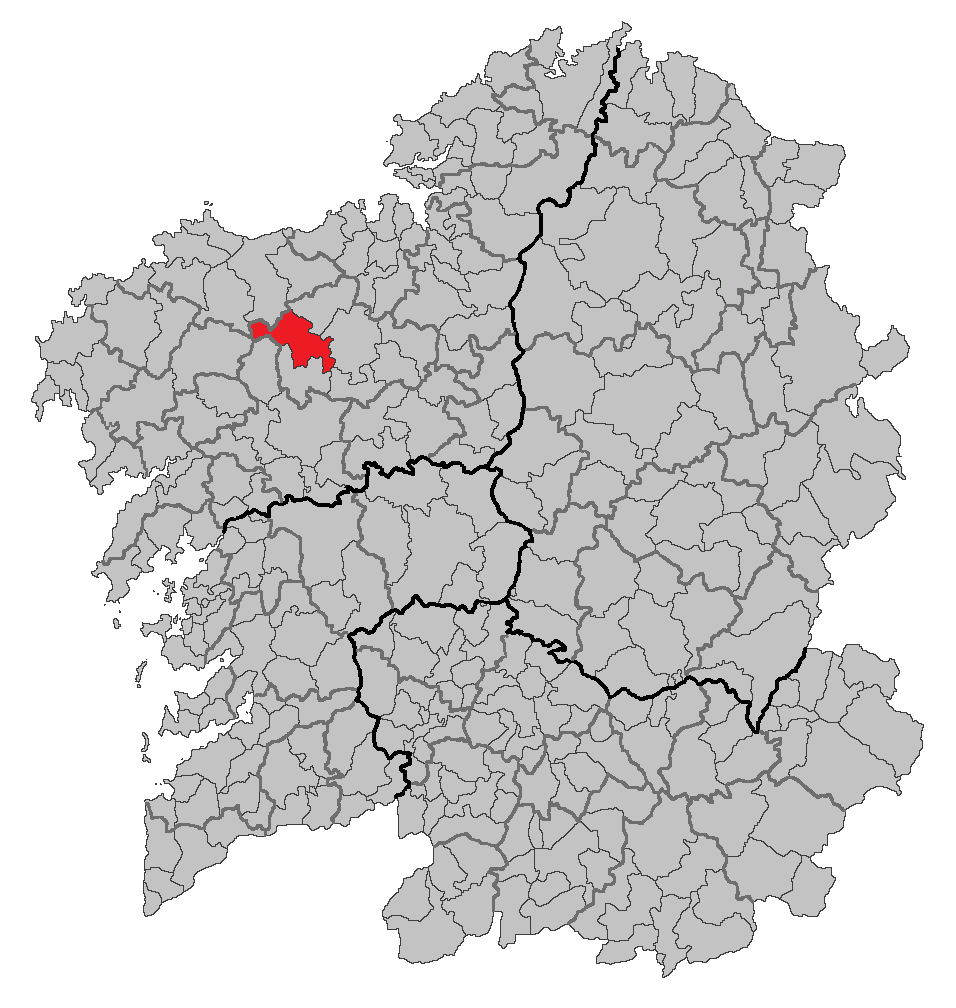
- Location of Tordoia

- Location in Spain
- Country: Spain
- Autonomous community: Galicia
- Province: A Coruña
- Comarca: Ordes

Government
  - Alcalde: Eduardo Antonio Pereiro Liñares (People's Party)
- Demonym: Tordoiés/tordoiesa
- Time zone: UTC+1 (CET)
  - Summer (DST): UTC+2 (CEST)
- Postal code: 15683
- Website: Official website

Tordoia (Galician pronunciation: [toɾˈðojɐ]) is a municipality in the province of A Coruña, in the autonomous community of Galicia, northwestern Spain. It belongs to the comarca of Ordes. It has a population of 4847 (Spanish 2001 Census) and an area of 125 km^{2} (48 sq mi).

== See also ==
List of municipalities in A Coruña
