= Oroso =

Coordinates: 42°59′N 8°26′W

Concello de Oroso
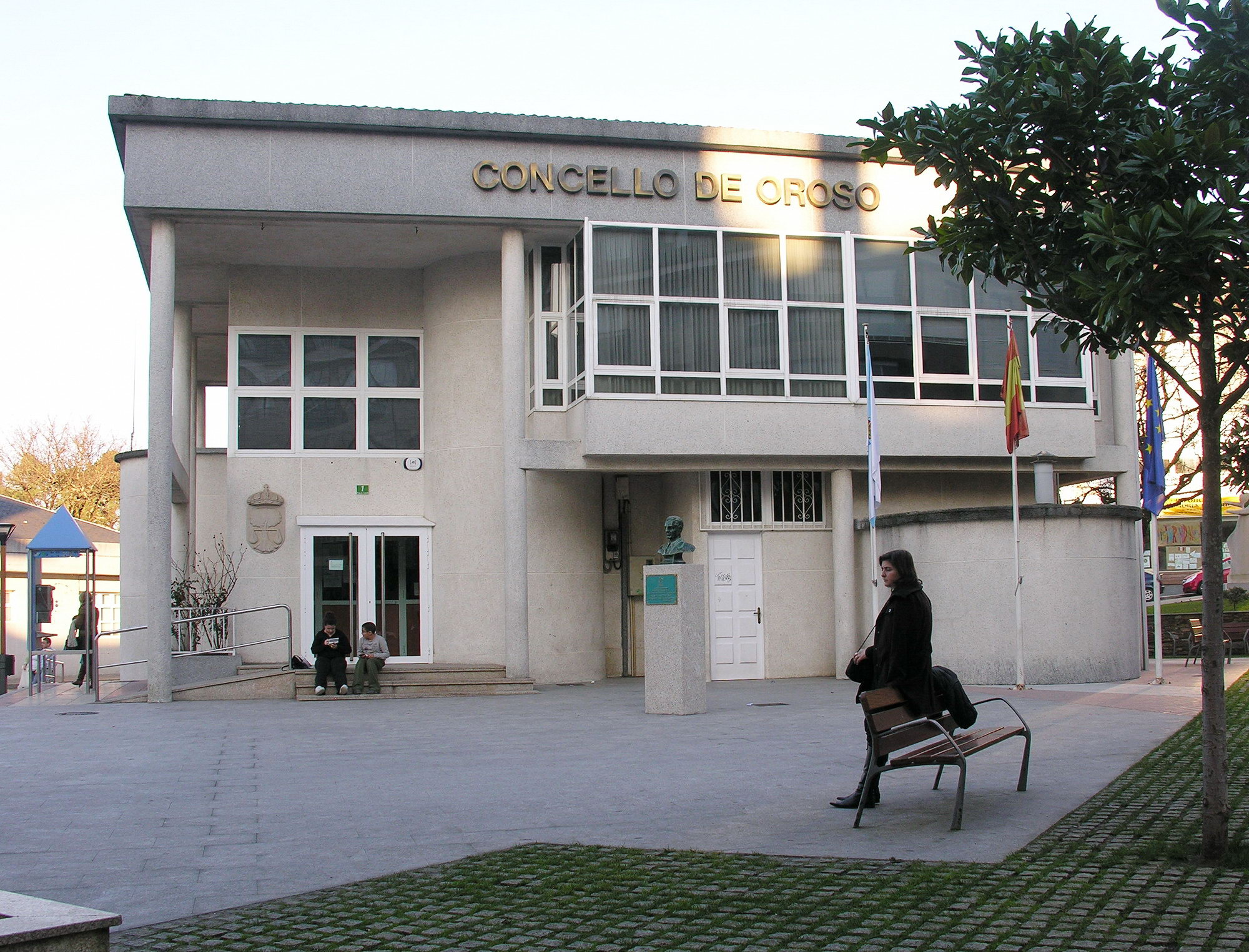

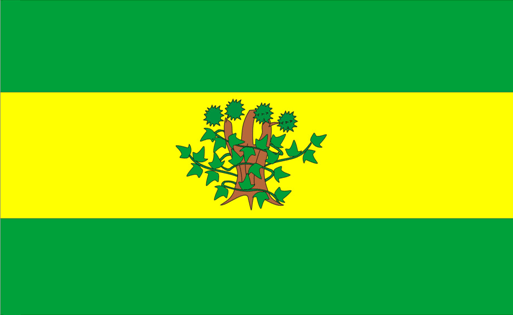
- Flag Coat of arms
- Nickname: Oroso
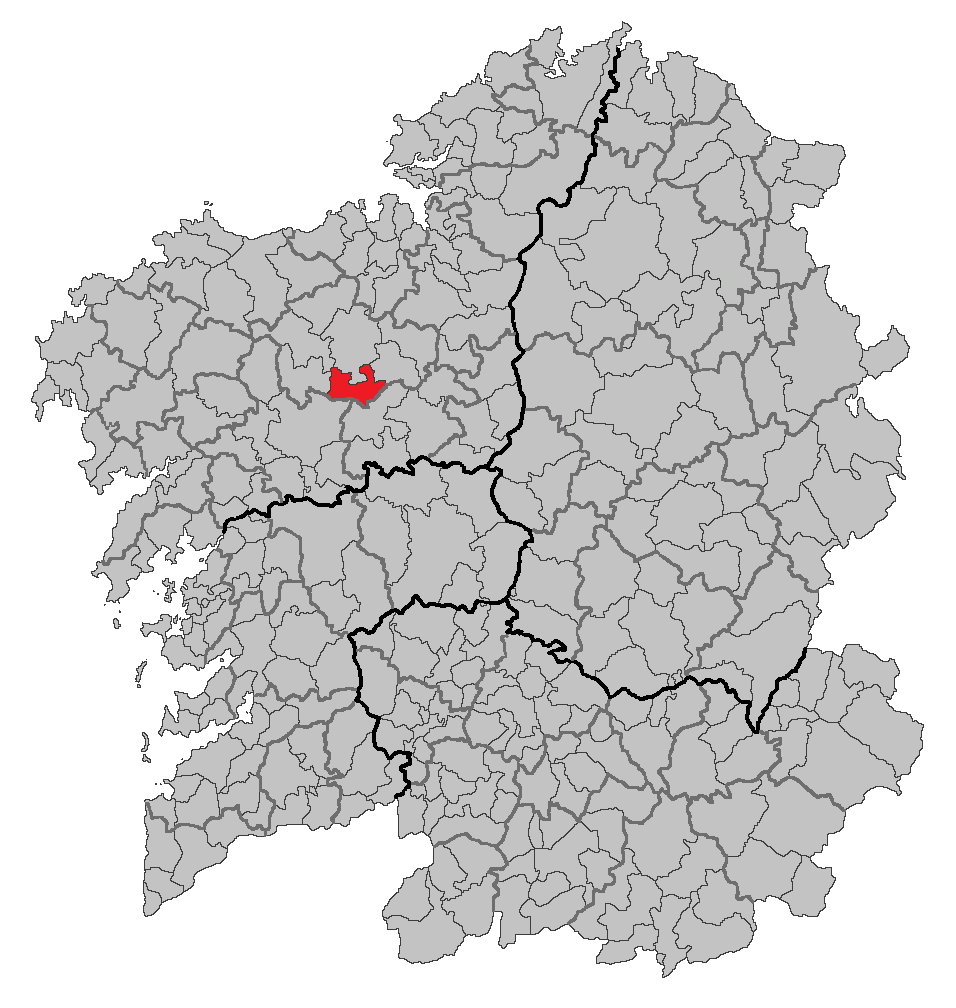
- Location of Oroso within Galicia
- Parroquias: 11

Government
  - Alcalde (Mayor): Manuel Mirás Franqueira

Area
  - Total: 72.38 km^{2} (27.95 sq mi)

Population (2025-01-01)
  - Total: 7,776
  - Density: 107.4/km^{2} (278.3/sq mi)
- Time zone: UTC+1 (CET)
  - Summer (DST): UTC+2 (CEST)
- Website: http://www.concellooroso.com/

Oroso is a municipality of northwestern Spain in the province of A Coruña, in the autonomous community of Galicia. It belongs to the comarca of Ordes.

== See also ==
- List of municipalities in A Coruña
