= Ordes =

- Municipality
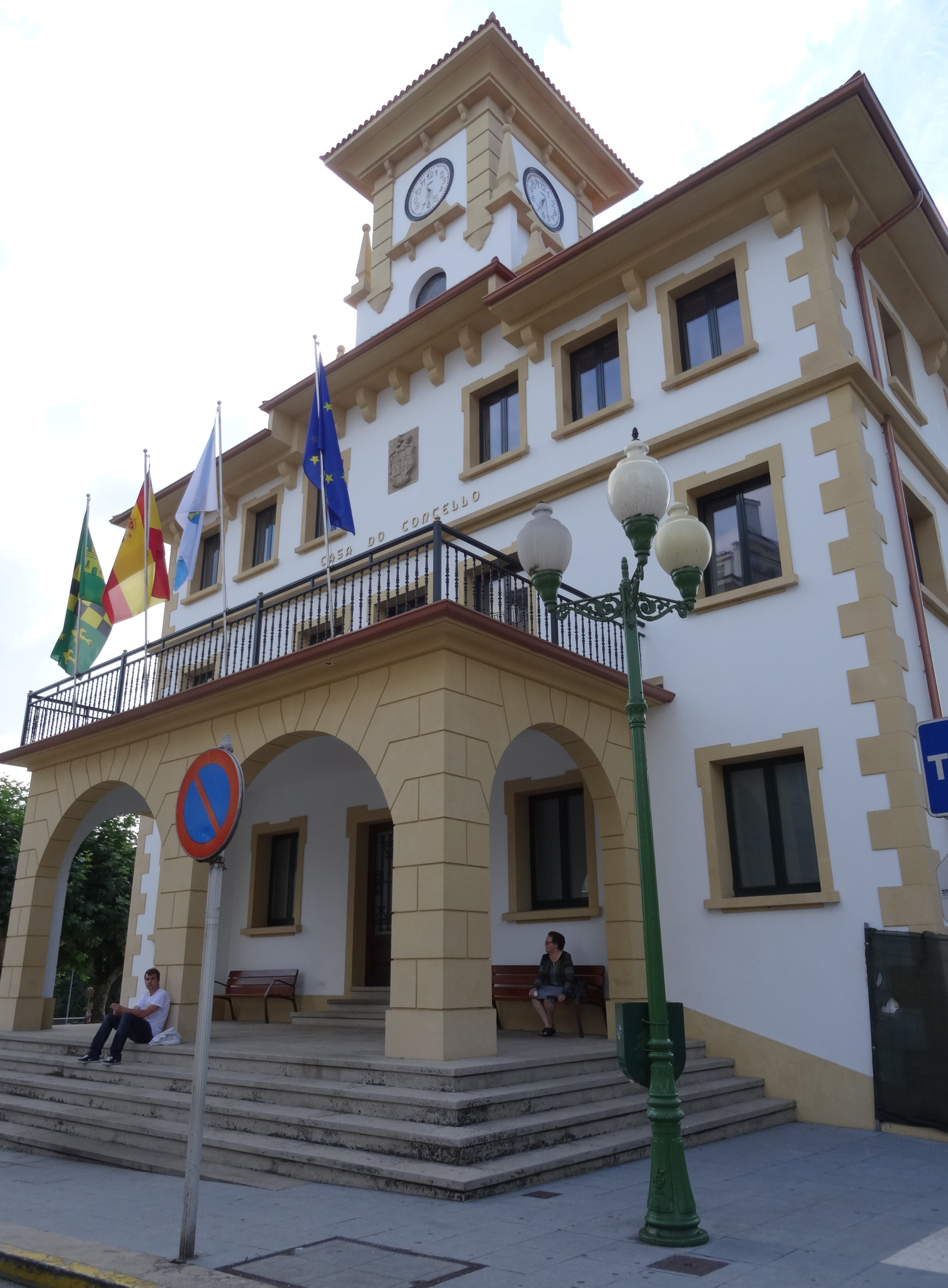

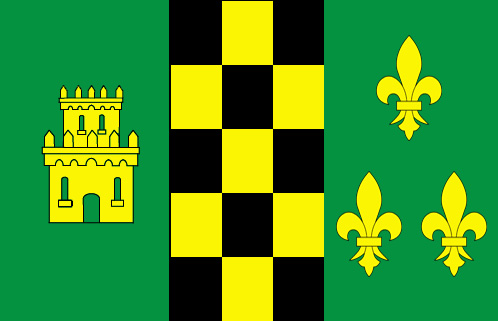
- Flag Coat of arms

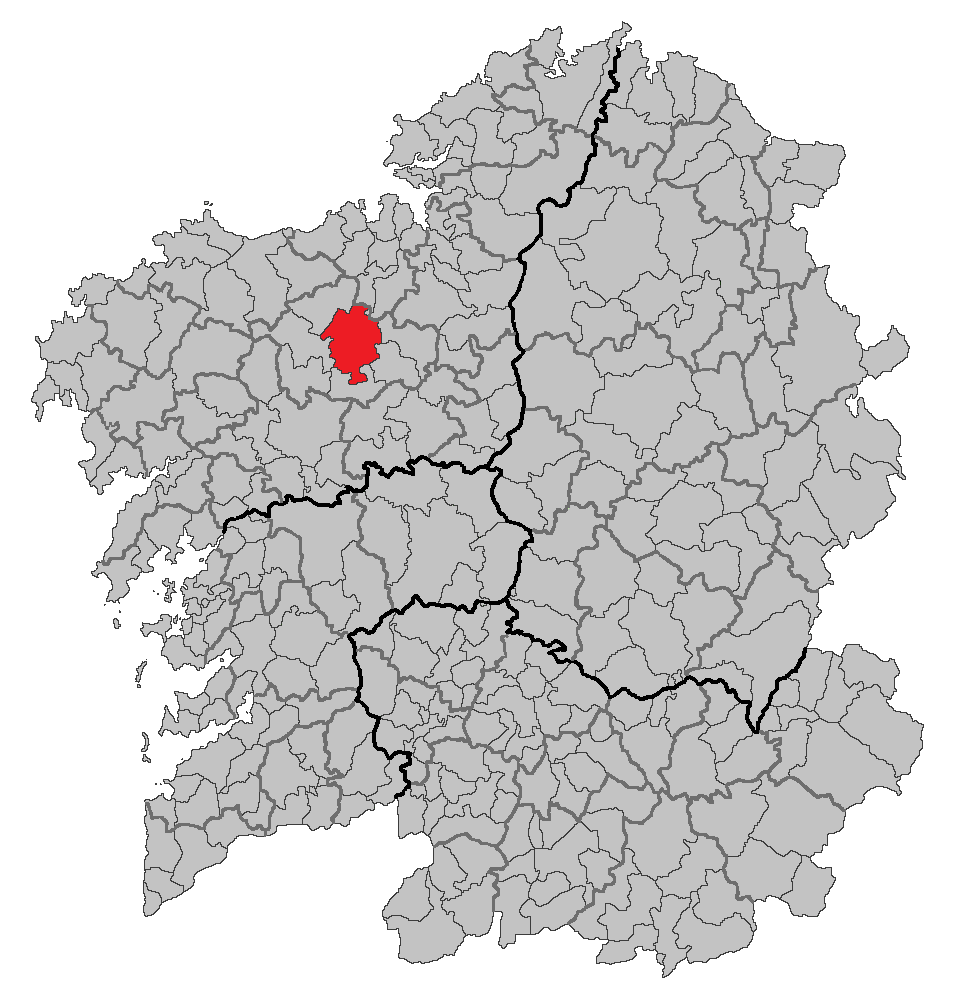
- Location of Ordes

- Location in Spain
- Coordinates: 43°4′36″N 8°24′26″W
- Country: Spain
- Autonomous community: Galicia
- Province: A Coruña
- Comarca: Ordes

Government
  - Alcalde: Jose Luis Martínez Sanjurjo (PPdeG)

Area
  - Total: 157.23 km^{2} (60.71 sq mi)
- Elevation: 292 m (958 ft)

Population (2025)
  - Total: 12,990
  - Density: 82.62/km^{2} (214.0/sq mi)
- Demonym: Ordense
- Time zone: UTC+1 (CET)
  - Summer (DST): UTC+2 (CEST)
- Postal code: 15680
- Website: Official website

Ordes is a municipality in the province of A Coruña, in the autonomous community of Galicia, Spain. It belongs to the comarca of Ordes. The population in 2008 was 12,534 inhabitants, according to the INE.

== Etymology ==
According to E. Bascuas, "Ordes", registered as Ordines in the 11th century, would derive from a form *ord- belonging to the old European hydronymy, and derived from the Indoeuropean root *er- 'flow, move'.

== See also ==
List of municipalities in A Coruña
