= Bermudo Pérez de Traba =

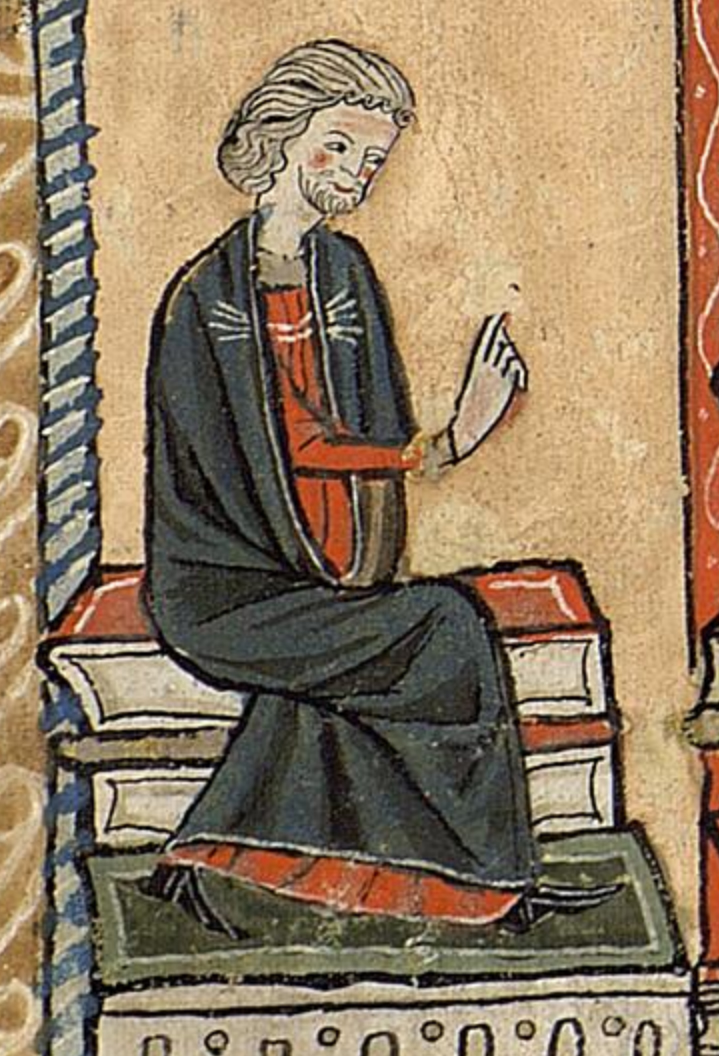
- Miniature portrait of Bermudo from the Tombo de Toxosoutos
- Born: c. 1088
- Died: 1168
- Buried: Monastery of Sobrado dos Monges, Galicia
- Spouses: Teresa Bermúdez; Adosinda González; Urraca Henriques
- Issue: See Descendants
- Father: Pedro Fróilaz de Traba
- Mother: Urraca Fróilaz

Bermudo Pérez de Traba (Note: "Pérez" is a patronymic meaning "son of Pedro" (Peter). His first name is also spelled Vermudo. The toponymic "de Traba", which derives from a place his father ruled, was not applied to all members of the family until the 13th century, long after Bermudo's death.) (died 1168), the eldest son of Count Pedro Fróilaz de Traba and his first wife Urraca Fróilaz, was a member of the most important medieval lineage in Galicia. He governed as a tenente Trastámara, Faro (A Coruña), Viseu, and Seia, owned vast estates in his native land, and was a generous patron of religious institutions.

== Biographical sketch ==
Bermudo was never honored with the title of count, although he was an important magnate and appears in charters signing as dominus (Latin for "lord") and also as Vermudo Petriz Galleciae ("Bermudo Pérez of Galicia"). His presence in medieval documentation is first recorded on 1 April 1104 when, with his brother, Count Fernando Pérez de Traba, he made a donation to the Monastery de San Xoán de Caaveiro. He was a vassal of Queen Urraca of León and, with his brothers, swore his loyalty to her son Alfonso VII upon his ascension to the throne of the Kingdom of León in Zamora.

On 29 July 1118, Queen Urraca, with the consent of her son Alfonso, returned to Bermudo and to his brother Fernando the territories belonging to the monastery at Sobrado which King Ferdinand I had taken by force in 1050. (Note: "Ego Urraca regina hispanie ...uobis Beremundo Petri et fratre vestro Ferdinando Petri, damus Monasterium Superado (...) quod possedit auuus meus Ferdinandus Rex et uxor eius regina domina Sancia de auo vestro Segeredo Aloiti et uxore eius Adosinda." Segeredo and Adosinda were the maternal great-grandparents of Bermudo's mother, Urraca Fróilaz.) In gratitude Bermudo and Fernando made a gift of a hound named Ulgar and a hunting spear to Alfonso VII. A few years later, on 25 July 1122, he granted his wife Urraca Henriques several properties, including the estates in Las Cascas plus another three villages and two monasteries.

Two years later, in 1125, he appears in Portugal confirming a donation made by Countess Theresa, as lord or governor of Viseu while his brother appears as the governor of Coimbra.

After the death of Theresa, Countess of Portugal, on 11 November 1130, he participated in the uprising from his castle in Seia, although his brother-in-law, King Afonso Henriques, forced him to desist and Bermudo returned to Galicia, rarely crossing the Minho River thereafter.

On 9 October 1138, he rebuilt the Monastery of Genrozo, later known as Nuestra Señora de las Dueñas, and finally as Las Cascas. It was most probably founded by Froila Bermúdez, Bermudo's grandfather. He had inherited half of the monastery from his father, Pedro Fróilaz, and King Alfonso VII, who had been raised with Bermudo since Pedro had been his tutor, returned the other half of the monastery which Pedro Fróilaz had given him, so that Bermudo would have the entire property. He gave the monastery to his daughter Urraca (the elder) who entered the convent as a nun and later became its abbess. On 8 September 1145, Urraca, with the consent of her father, donated it to the Monastery of Sobrado. The monastery, now in ruins with only the church of San Pelayo de Genrozo standing, was situated in the territory of Nendos, in a small village known as Las Cascas, close to the city of Betanzos.

According to the Chronicon Lusitanum, a Portuguese source, Bermudo was one of the nobles taken as a captive after the Battle of Valdevez in 1140.

He and his brother Fernando made many donations to the monastery at Sobrado, which had been founded by their ancestors, and owned all its estates over a period of 24 years, from 1118 until 11 January 1142 when they voluntarily handed it over to the Cistercian monks. (Note: The Monastery of Sobrado had been founded in 952 by count Hermenegildo Alóitez and his wife Paterna Gundesíndiz. One of their sons, dux Rodrigo Menéndez married Elvira Alóitez and were the parents of count Gutierre Rodríguez de Aranga who married Gundesinda and had a daughter named Ilduara Gutiérrez who married count Menendo Bermúdez de Faro, the parents of Elvira de Faro, wife of count Pedro Froílaz.)

He went twice on pilgrimages to the Holy Land; the first time in 1147 with his brother Fernando and cousin Menendo Rodríguez returning to Galicia in 1148. He went again on his own in 1153 and was back in Galicia the next year as attested in a document recording the sale made by Adosinda Rodríguez of a property in Sobrado on 24 April 1155 which is dated, ipso anno presente, quando domnus Vermudis reversus est Hierosalime (when Don Bermudo was back from Jerusalem).

In 1148, he entrusted the abbot at the Benedictine monastery of Toxos Outos with the construction of a convent in Nogueirosa, one of the estates that he had given his wife Urraca as part of her wedding tokens on 25 July 1122. Years later, in 1150, Urraca made a donation of several properties to the newly founded establishment under the condition that she and four female relatives were to be accepted as members of the religious community of this convent which was called Santa María de Nogueirosa. In December 1156 he made his last recorded visit to the royal court at Palencia.

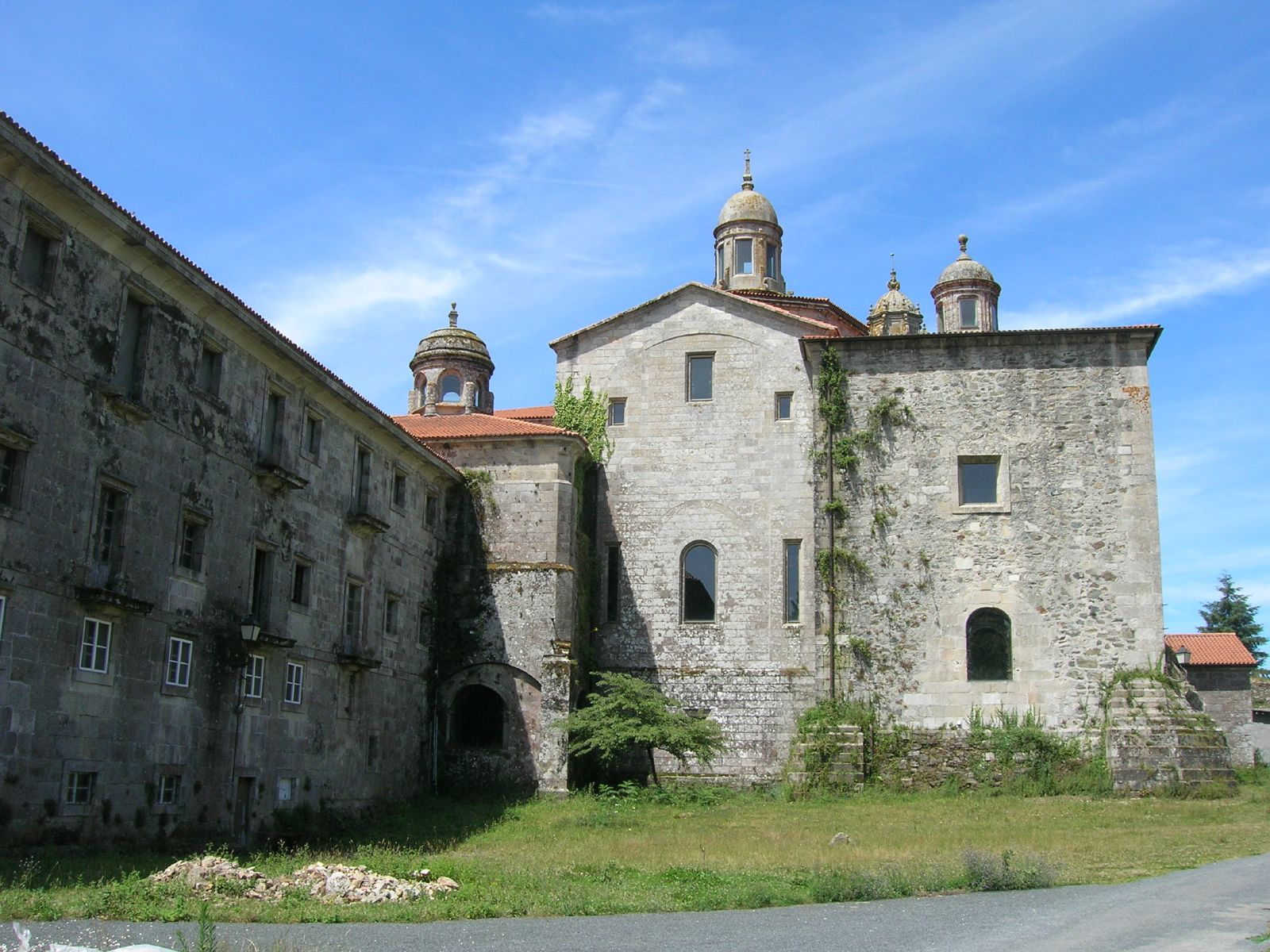
Monastery of Sobrado where Bermudo retired and was buried

On 6 August 1160, Bermudo retired as a Cistercian monk at the Monastery of Sobrado dos Monges. On 21 September 1161, Bermudo settled a dispute he had with the monks of Toxos Outos. In this charter he describes himself as "moved by divine inspiration" ("diuina inspiratione conmotus") to become a monk. He died in 1168 when he was approximately 80 years old and was buried at the abbey. At about the same time as her husband became a monk at Sobrado, Urraca entered the convent founded by her husband in Nogueirosa, a parish near Pontedeume, and died in 1173, receiving burial at the church in the convent.

== Marriage and issue ==
He married on more than one occasion, as he himself declares in a document dated 9 October 1138 when he made a donation to his daughter Urraca, a nun and later abbess at the Monastery of Cascas. (Note: "...uma cum filiis et filiabus nostris et cum ómnibus filiis et filiabus quos de uxoribus meis prioribus habui..." (with our sons and daughters and with all the sons and daughters that I had with my previous wives).)

He had three children from one of his first wives, Teresa Bermúdez:

- Pedro Bermúdez (died in 1147), in 1147 his father made a donation to the Monastery of Sobrado for the soul of his son.
- Enrique Bermúdez (died after 1151)
- Mayor Bermúdez (died after 1192), was the wife of the Portuguese noble Gonçalo Mendes, son of Mem Rodrigues de Tougues and Chamoa Gomes.

He was also apparently married to Adosinda González with whom he had two daughters: (Note: In 1137, Ilduara and Jimena made a donation to the Cathedral of Braga of some properties in the Lima region and in Cávado, which, they state, they had from their parents "...Veremudo Petri et mater nostra Adosinda Gunzalviz". The author Almeida Fernandes believes that Adosinda could have been the sister of Sancha González, the legitimate wife of his brother Fernando Pérez de Traba, both of them being the daughters of Count Gonzalo Peláez. Nevertheless, Sancha's parents were Count Gonzalo Ansúrez and Countess Urraca Bermúdez, the latter being the daughter of Count Bermudo Ovéquiz and his wife Jimena Peláez. On 24 April 1142, Sancha González had made a donation to the Monastery of Lourenzá where she mentions her grandfather Bermudo Ovéquiz.)

- Ilduara Bermúdez
- Jimena Bermúdez

He married, around July 1122, Urraca Henriques (Enríquez), daughter of Henry, Count of Portugal and his wife, Theresa of León. The offspring of this marriage were:

- Fernando Bermúdez (died after 1161), who appears frequently in the Kingdom of Portugal confirming charters of his uncle King Afonso Henriques.
- Urraca Bermúdez "the elder", a nun and abbess at the Monastery of Cascas.
- Suero Bermúdez (died in 1169), buried at the Monastery of Sobrado.
- Teresa Bermúdez (died c. 1219), buried also at Sobrado, she married the Galician magnate Fernando Arias, Lord of Batisela, with whom she had several children, including Juan Fernández, Mayordomo mayor and alférez of King Alfonso IX of León.
- Sancha Bermúdez (died c. 1208), in 1152, she married Soeiro Viegas de Riba Douro, governor of Lamego and son of Egas Moniz, o Aio. One of her sons, Lourenço Soares was the husband of Urraca Sanches, illegitimate daughter of King Sancho I of Portugal.
- Urraca Bermúdez "the younger" (died after 1196), she was still alive in 1196 when she confirmed a charter in the Monastery of Sobrado as domna Urraca Ueremude filia domni Ueremudi Petri. She married Pedro Beltran.

== Bibliography ==
- Almeida Fernandes, A. de (1978). "Guimarães, 24 de junho de 1128" (PDF). Revista Guimarães (in Portuguese) (88). Guimarães: Sociedade Martins Sarmento: 5–145. ISSN 0871-0759. Archived from the original (PDF) on 2015-09-23.
- Barros, Carlos (2009). "Origen del castillo y coto de Aranga, Siglos X–XII". Cuadernos de Estudios Gallegos (in Spanish). LVI (122): 139–150. doi:10.3989/ceg.2009.v56.i122.59. ISSN 0210-847X.
- Barton, Simon (1997). The Aristocracy in Twelfth-century León and Castile. Cambridge: Cambridge University Press. ISBN 9780521497275.
- Daviña Sáinz, Santiago (1998). "El monasterio de las Cascas (Betanzos) (I)" (PDF). Anuario Brigantino (in Spanish) (21). Braga: Consello de Betanzos, A Coruña Câmara Municipal de Braga: 77–102. OCLC 72890459.
- López Morán, Enriqueta (2004). "El Monacato Femenino Gallego en la Alta Edad Media (La Coruña y Pontevedra)" (PDF). Revista Nalgures (in Spanish). I. A Coruña: Asociación Cultural de Estudios Históricos de Galicia: 119–174. ISSN 1885-6349. Archived from the original (PDF) on 2012-02-17.
- López-Sangil, José Luis (2002). La nobleza altomedieval gallega, la familia Froílaz-Traba (in Spanish). La Coruña: Toxosoutos, S.L. ISBN 84-95622-68-8.
- Pallarés Méndez, M. C.; Portela Silva, E. (1993). "Aristocracia y sistema de parentesco en la Galicia de los siglos centrales de la Edad Media: El grupo de los Traba". Hispania (in Spanish). 53 (185): 823–840. ISSN 0018-2141.
- Sánchez de Mora, Antonio (2003). La nobleza castellana en la plena Edad Media: el linaje de Lara (Phd) (in Spanish). Universidad de Sevilla. hdl:11441/15220.
- Torres Sevilla-Quiñones de León, Margarita Cecilia (1999). Linajes nobiliarios de León y Castilla: Siglos IX-XIII (in Spanish). Salamanca: Junta de Castilla y León, Consejería de educación y cultura. ISBN 84-7846-781-5.
