= Hermenegildo Alóitez =

- Count of Présaras
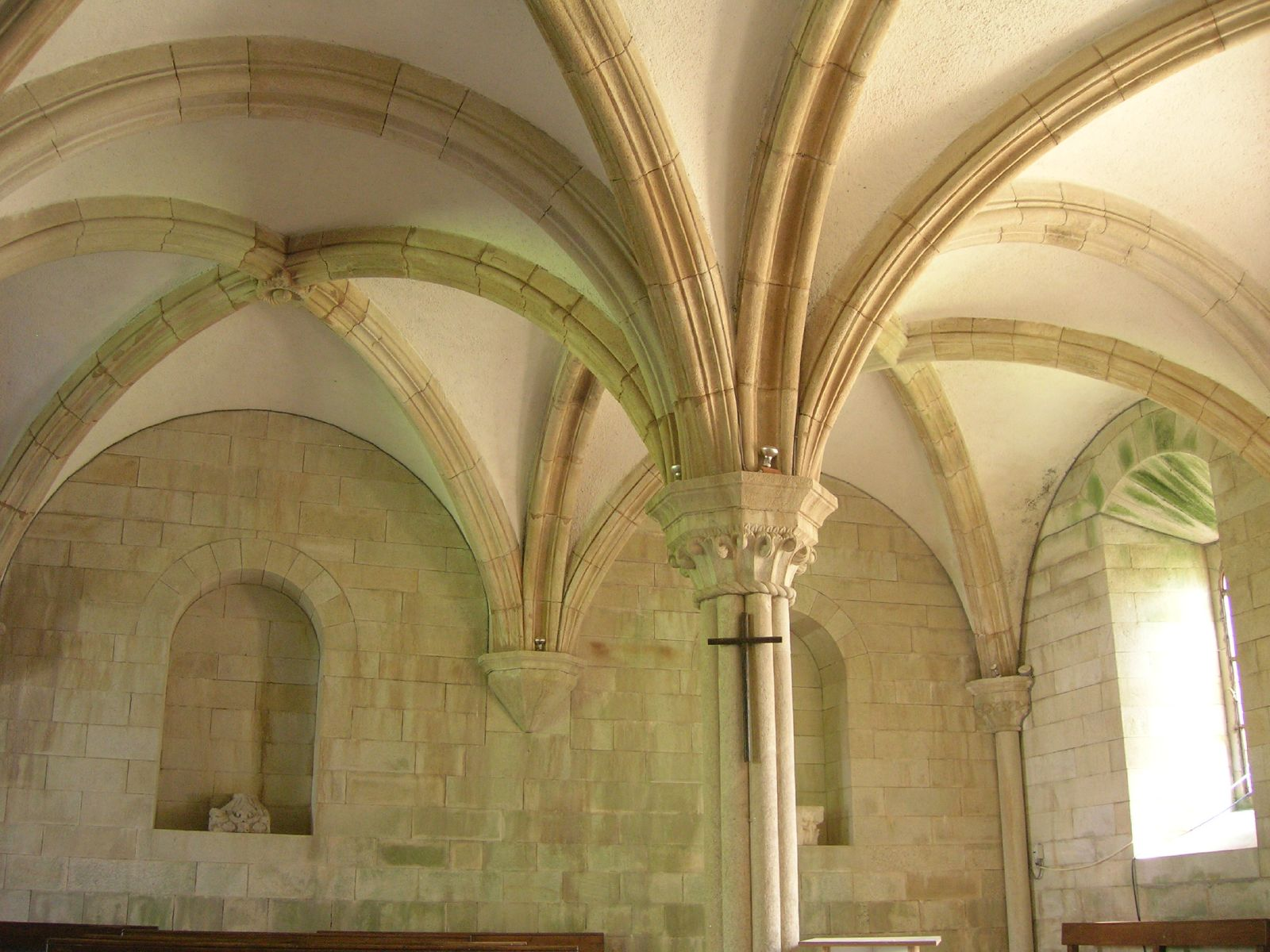
- Sobrado Abbey, founded by Hermenegildo and his wife Paterna
- Born: c. 898
- Died: before 10 December 966; Sobrado, Galicia
- Buried: Monastery of Sobrado dos Monges, Galicia
- Noble family: Ancestor of the House of Traba
- Spouse: Paterna Gundesíndiz
- Issue: See Descendants
- Father: Alóito Gutiérrez
- Mother: Argilo Alóitez

Hermenegildo Alóitez (c. 898 – before 10 December 966), was a magnate and member of the highest nobility of Galicia in the 10th century. His parents were Count Aloito Gutiérrez and Argilo Alóitez, daughter of Alóito and Paterna, the founders of the monastery of San Nicolao de Cis in the territory of Nendos, A Coruña.

== Biographical sketch ==
Hermenegildo came from a prominent family with ties to the crown and church. A paternal uncle was Count Hermenegildo Gutiérrez, who defeated the Muslim troops and conquered Porto and Coimbra and was the father of Queen Elvira Menéndez, wife of King Ordoño II, and grandfather of Saint Rudesind, of Queen Adosinda Gutiérrez, the first wife of King Ramiro II, and of Count Osorio Gutiérrez the founder of the Monastery of Lourenzá. A Count Osorio, the other grandfather of Queen Adosinda and Count Osorio Gutiérrez, has been identified as another uncle. (Note: While historian Manuel Carriedo Tejedo accepts that Hermenegildo Gutiérrez was brother of Aloito Gutiérrez, father of Hermenegildo Alóitez, he found unconvincing the arguments put forward by Sáez that the elder Count Osorio was their sibling.) He had three brothers; Gundesindo Alóitez, Bishop of Iria Flavia, Arias, and Count Gutierre Alóitez.

In 920, he was named Count of Présaras by King Ramiro II whom he served as his mayordomo mayor from 937 to 949. With his wife Paterna he founded in 952 the Monastery of Sobrado dos Monges. This monastery was inherited by his descendants, members of the House of Traba, and nearly two centuries later, in January 1142, two of the most relevant members of this lineage, the brothers Fernando and Bermudo Pérez de Traba, handed it over to the Cistercian monks. In 958, Hermenegildo and Paterna transferred the county of Présaras to the monastery which they had founded and, in that same year, he retired there where he lived as a monk the rest of his life. He died before 10 December 966 and was buried at his monastery.

== Marriage and issue ==
He married Paterna Gundesíndiz (died before December 955), daughter of Gundesindo and Senior, with whom he appears in 916 buying certain properties. They were the parents of

- Sisnando Menéndez (died in 968) Bishop of Iria Flavia, because of a conflict with King Sancho I of León, he was dispossessed of his privileges which were given to Bishop Rudesind, although he was able to recover them at a later date. He died in 968 fighting against the Norman invaders.
- Rodrigo Menéndez, dux and owner of the castle in Aranga, married to Elvira Alóitez. One of their sons, Gutierre Rodríguez and his wife Gundesinda were the parents of Ilduara Gutiérrez, the mother of Elvira de Faro, the first wife of count Froila Vermúdez. The latter had several children, including Count Pedro Fróilaz de Traba and it was through this marriage that the Monastery of Sobrado was inherited by the Traba brothers, Fernando and Bermudo.
- A daughter whose name is not recorded, the wife of García Íñiguez. In 984, their daughter Jimena Garcés, made a donation to the Monastery of Sobrado where she mentions her parents and her maternal uncles Sisnando and Rodrigo.

== Bibliography ==
- Barros, Carlos (2009). "Origen del castillo y coto de Aranga, Siglos X–XII". Cuadernos de Estudios Gallegos (in Spanish). LVI (122): 139–150. doi:10.3989/ceg.2009.v56.i122.59. ISSN 0210-847X.
- Carriedo Tejedo, Manuel (2007). "La familia de San Rosendo" (PDF). Estudios Mindoniense (in Spanish). 23. Diócesis de Mondoñedo-Ferrol: 103–123.
- Daviña Sáinz, Santiago (1998). "El monasterio de las Cascas (Betanzos) (I)" (PDF). Anuario Brigantino (in Spanish) (21). Braga: Consello de Betanzos, A Coruña Câmara Municipal de Braga: 77–102. OCLC 72890459.
- López-Sangil, José Luis (2001). "La fundación del Monasterio de San Salvador de Cines" (PDF). Anuario Brigantino (in Spanish). No. 24. Betanzos. pp. 139–156. OCLC 402770925.
- Sáez, Emilio (1947). "Los ascendientes de San Rosendo: notas para el estudio de la monarquía astur-leonesa durante los siglos IX y X". Hispania: Revista española de Historia (in Spanish) (XXX). Madrid: CSIC, Instituto Jerónimo Zurita: 139–156. OCLC 682814356.
- Torres Sevilla-Quiñones de León, Margarita Cecilia (1999). Linajes nobiliarios de León y Castilla: Siglos IX-XIII (in Spanish). Salamanca: Junta de Castilla y León, Consejería de educación y cultura. ISBN 84-7846-781-5.
