= Festa do melindre de Melide =

Food festival in Melide, Spain

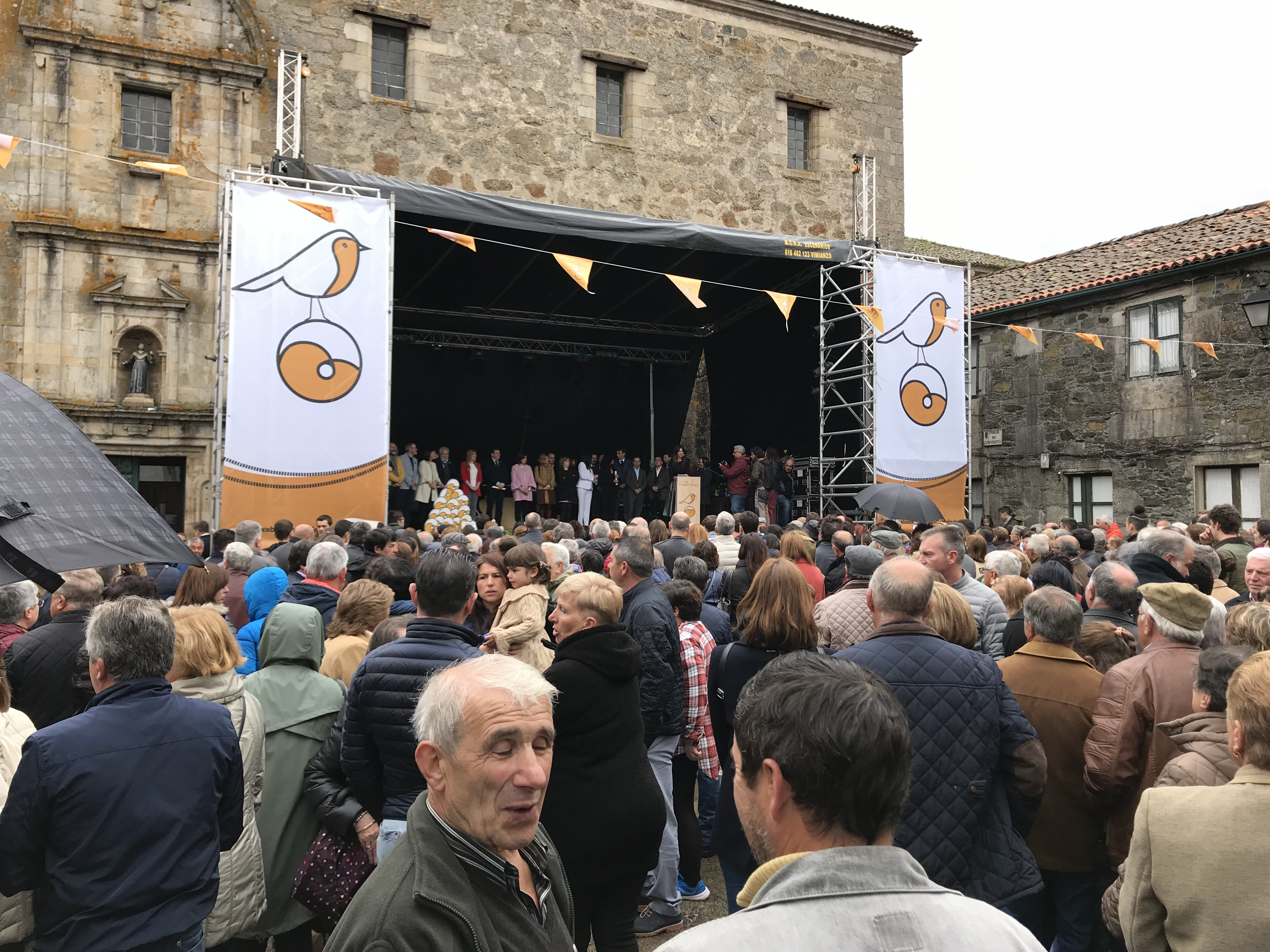
- Commanders' Stage, year 2018
- Date: First Weekend of May
- Frequency: Annual
- Location: Melide, Spain

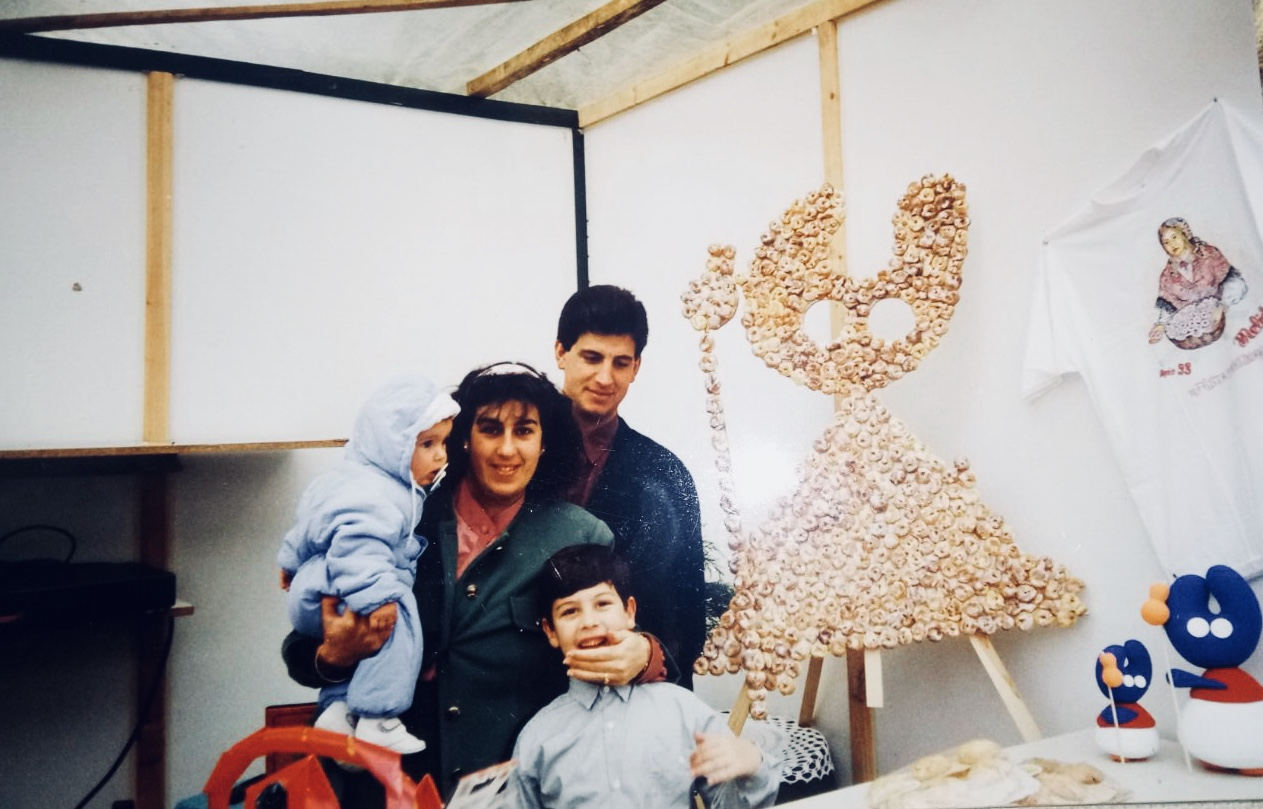
Family posing with a Pelegrin(design of a pilgrim presented during the Expo '92) made from melindres during the festival, year 1994

The Festa do melindre de Melide is a gastronomical fair held in Melide, Spain. The fair features musical shows, an opening speaker nominated by the major and an open market to promote the local baking tradition and their main three local biscuits, melindre, rico (unique to Melide) and amendoado, a type of marzipan. Up to 4 traditional bakery houses join the event yearly as a representation of the traditional recipes : O Estilo, Casa Melchora, Tahona and Trisquel. The festival attracted up to 10,000 attendees yearly since 1991.

== History ==
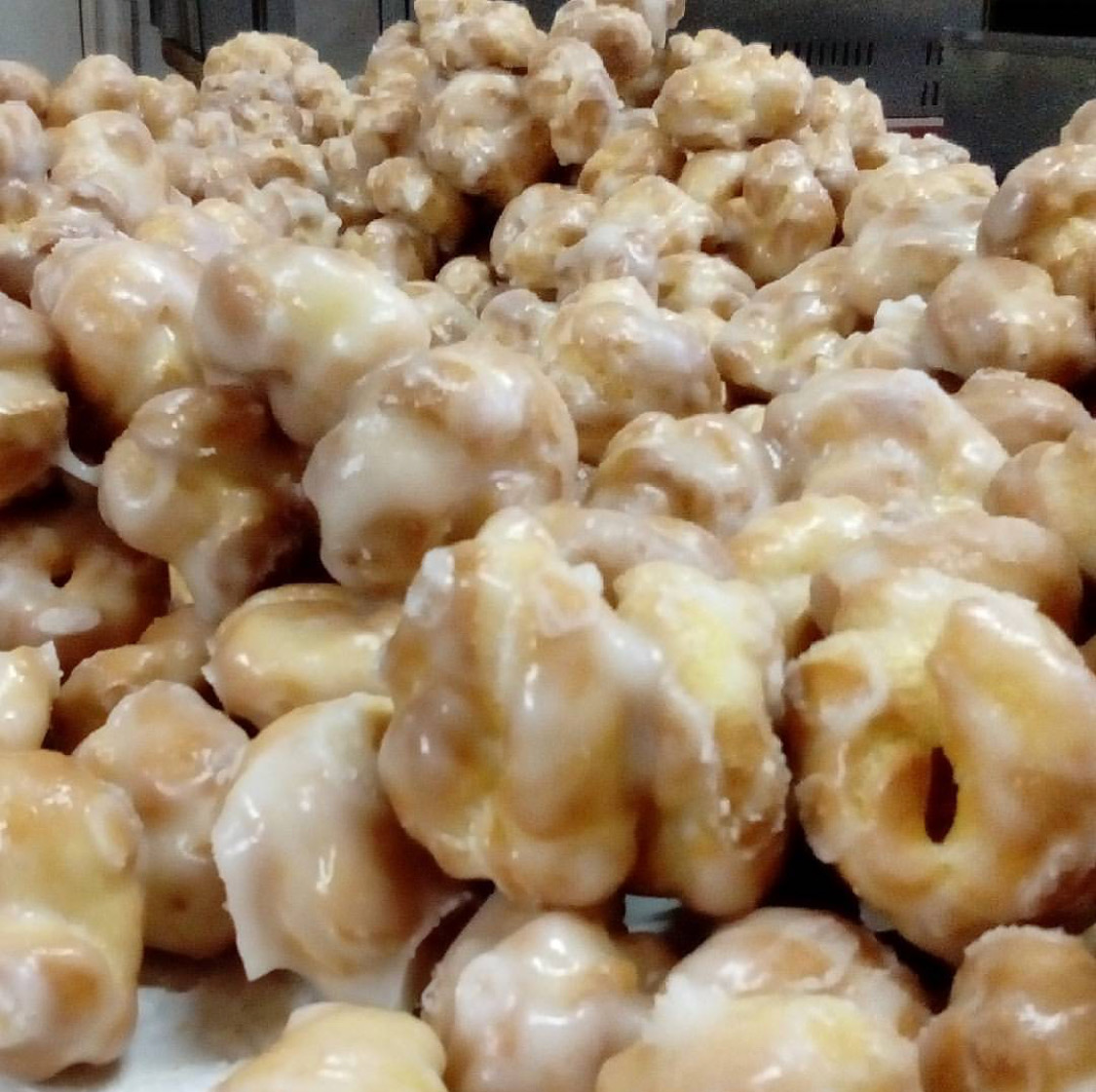
Melindres

In 1991 the Town Council of Melide organized the first Festa do melindre, which would continue uninterrupted until 2007, with the following absence of the years during the COVID-19 pandemic, when it was not held. The first festival proclamation was delivered by the Melidean writer, Xosé Vázquez Pintor.

The aim was to pay tribute to a long-standing local baking tradition. At the same time, the council began bringing together other events under the name "Feira de Mostras" (Trade Fair), including the Exaltation of Galician Veal and the Horse Festival. Gradually, the gastronomical events became the center of the celebration.

From the 2008 edition onwards, the Melindre Festival moved to the historic Praza do Convento in Melide. In this square, where the Primitive Way and the French Way of Saint James meet, visitors can also find the Museum of the Land of Melide.

The first edition of the Melindre Festival featured a procession through the town and a popular open-air dance in the square.

Between 1992 and 1994 the festival continued to be held in the same format.

From 1995 activities were moved to the fairgrounds, with performances by folk groups and orchestras.
