= Sobrado Abbey =

Cistercian monastery in Galiza, Spain

Coordinates: 43.05°N 8.03333°W

- Mosteiro de Santa María de Sobrado dos Monxes
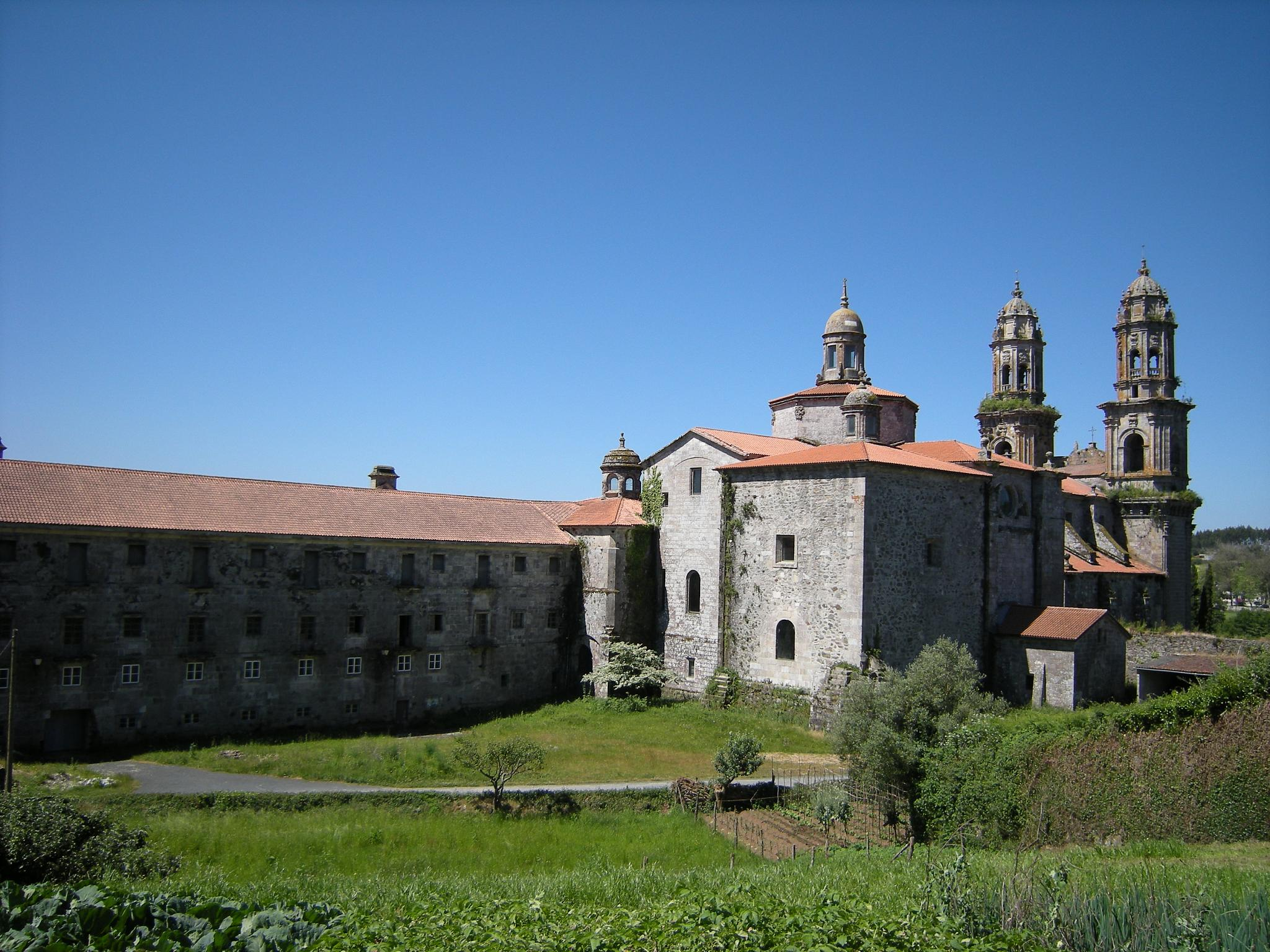

Religion
- Affiliation: Roman Catholic Trappist
- Ecclesiastical or organizational status: Monastery
- Patron: St Mary

Location
- Location: Sobrado (A Coruña), Spain
- Interactive map of Sobrado Abbey

Architecture
- Style: Cistercian, Baroque
- UNESCO World Heritage Site
- Type: Cultural
- Criteria: ii, iv, vi
- Designated: 2015 (32nd session)
- Parent listing: Routes of Santiago de Compostela: Camino Francés and Routes of Northern Spain
- Reference no.: 669bis-016
- Region: Europe and North America
- Spanish Cultural Heritage
- Type: Non-movable
- Criteria: Monument
- Designated: 3 June 1931
- Reference no.: RI-51-0000547

Sobrado Abbey, (Spanish: Monasterio de Santa María de Sobrado de los Monjes or Galician: Mosteiro de Santa María de Sobrado dos Monxes) is a Cistercian monastery in the province of La Coruña, Galicia, Spain. It is situated in the municipality of Sobrado, about 9 km east of Corredoiras and about 46 km southeast of Betanzos, at an altitude of 540 m above sea level.

== History ==
The abbey was founded around 951 by Bishop Sisnando Menéndez, son of Counts Hermenegildo Alóitez and his wife Paterna, who in the following years give it several properties. The abbey was inherited by his descendants and it was abandoned by them. Nearly two centuries later, in January 1142, the brothers Fernando and Bermudo Pérez, two of the most distinguished members of the House of Traba, handed it over to the Cistercian monks from Clairvaux. The abbey flourished during the 12th and 13th centuries and was able to undertake the foundations of its own daughter house, Valdedios Abbey in Asturias. Sobrado was also given the supervision of Monfero Abbey after it joined the Cistercian Order.

After a period of decline, in 1498 Sobrado was the first abbey in Galicia to join the Castilian Cistercian Congregation.

The monumental new Baroque abbey church was dedicated in 1708. Most of the conventual buildings were also rebuilt at this time.

The dissolution of the monasteries enforced by the government of Mendizábal in 1836 put an end to the abbey, and the abandoned buildings fell into decay.

In 1954 the Cistercian (Trappist) monks of Viaceli Abbey in Cóbreces, west of Santander, began reconstruction, having already refounded and restored Huerta Abbey in 1929, and were able to resettle the monastery with a new community in 1966.

== Buildings ==
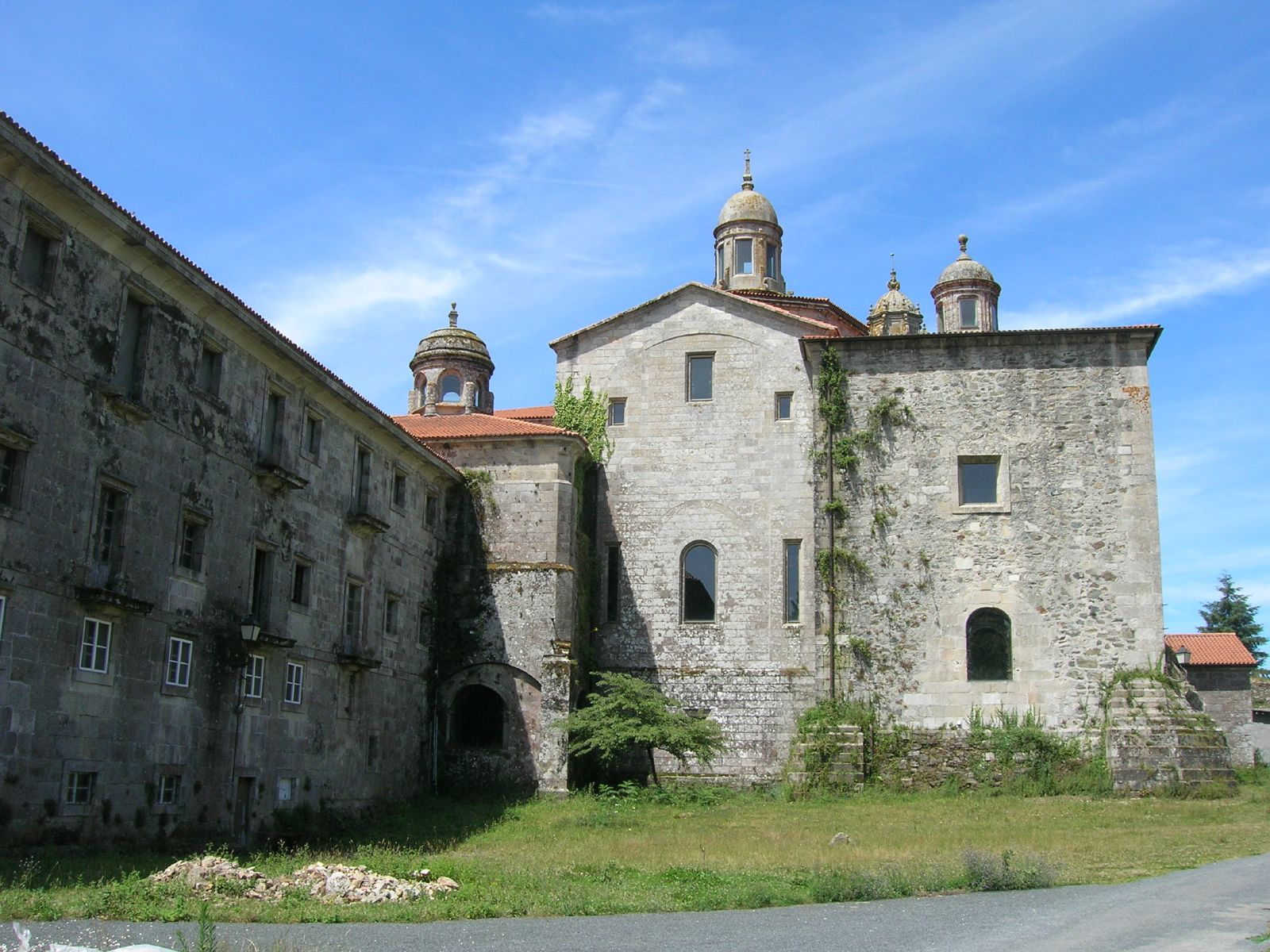
Sobrado Abbey monastic buildings

The present abbey church, now roofed with a number of domes and cupolas, was built at the end of the 17th century, although the Magdalene Chapel (Capela da Madalena or Capilla de la Magdalena) dates from the 14th century. The sacristy was built by Juan de Herrera. The monastery has three cloisters. The kitchen and the chapter house remain of the medieval monastic buildings.

== Bibliography ==
- Loscertales de G. de Valdeavellano, Pilar (1976). Tumbos del Monasterio de Sobrado de los Monjes (in Spanish). Vol. I. Madrid: Dirección General del Patrimonio Artístico y Cultural. Archivo Histórico Nacional. ISBN 84-369-0070-7.
- Pallares Méndez, Mª Carmen (1979). El monasterio de Sobrado: un ejemplo de protagonismo monástico en la Galicia medieval (in Spanish). La Coruña: Diputación Provincial de la Coruña.
- Daviña Sáinz, Santiago (1998). "El monasterio de las Cascas (Betanzos) (I)" (PDF). Anuario Brigantino (in Spanish) (21). Braga: Consello de Betanzos, A Coruña Câmara Municipal de Braga: 77–102. OCLC 72890459.
- Escudero Manzano, Gonzalo J. (2021). "Los condes de Présaras y la fundación de San Salvador de Sobrado. El intento de una parentela magnaticia por recuperar su preeminencia en Gallecia". Studia Historica. Historia Medieval (in Spanish). 39 (1): 197–213. doi:10.14201/shhme2021391197213. hdl:10366/147373. ISSN 2445-3595.
