= Toques, Spain =

Coordinates: 42°58′04″N 7°59′17″W

Toques
- Municipality
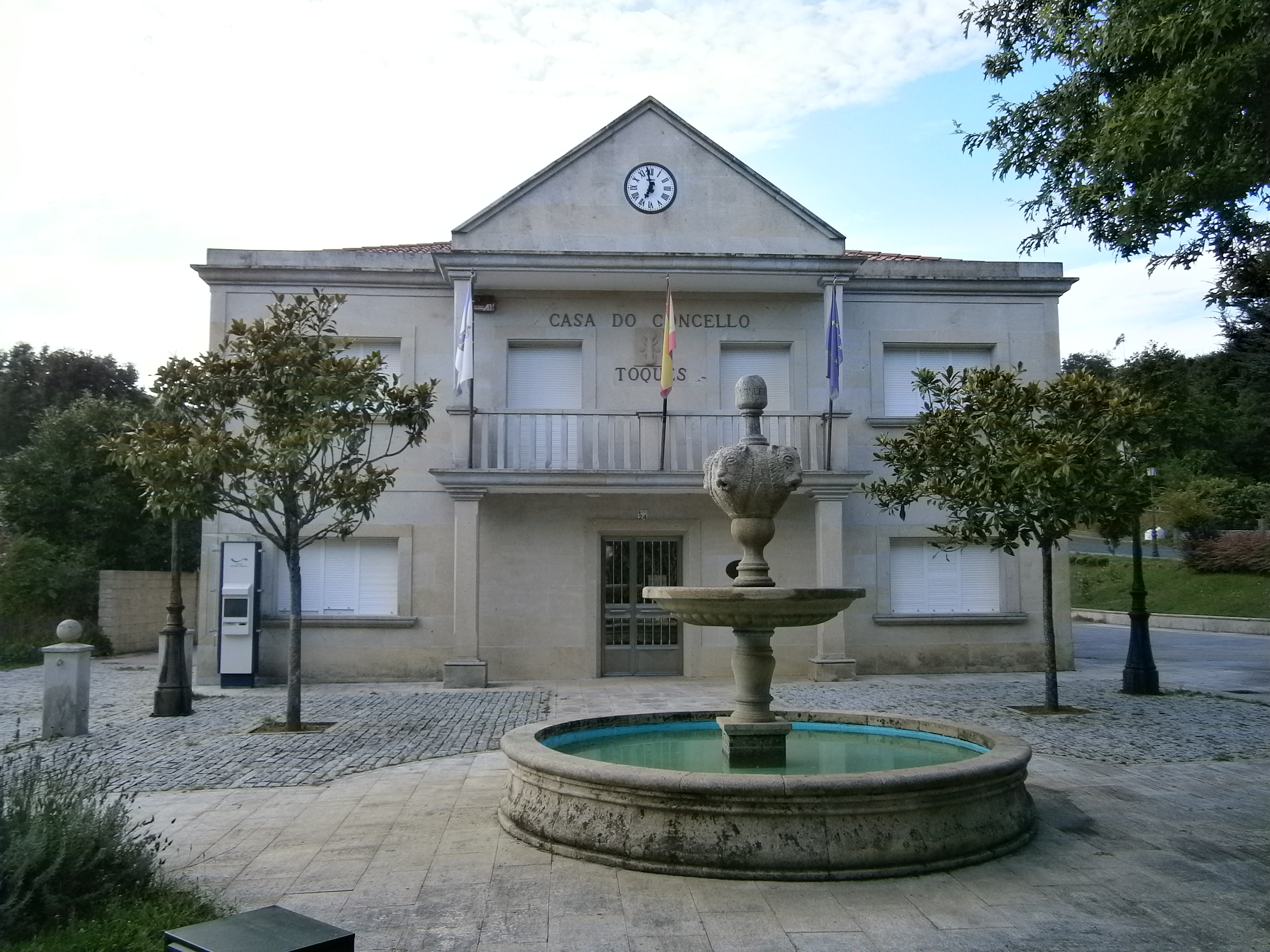

- Coat of arms

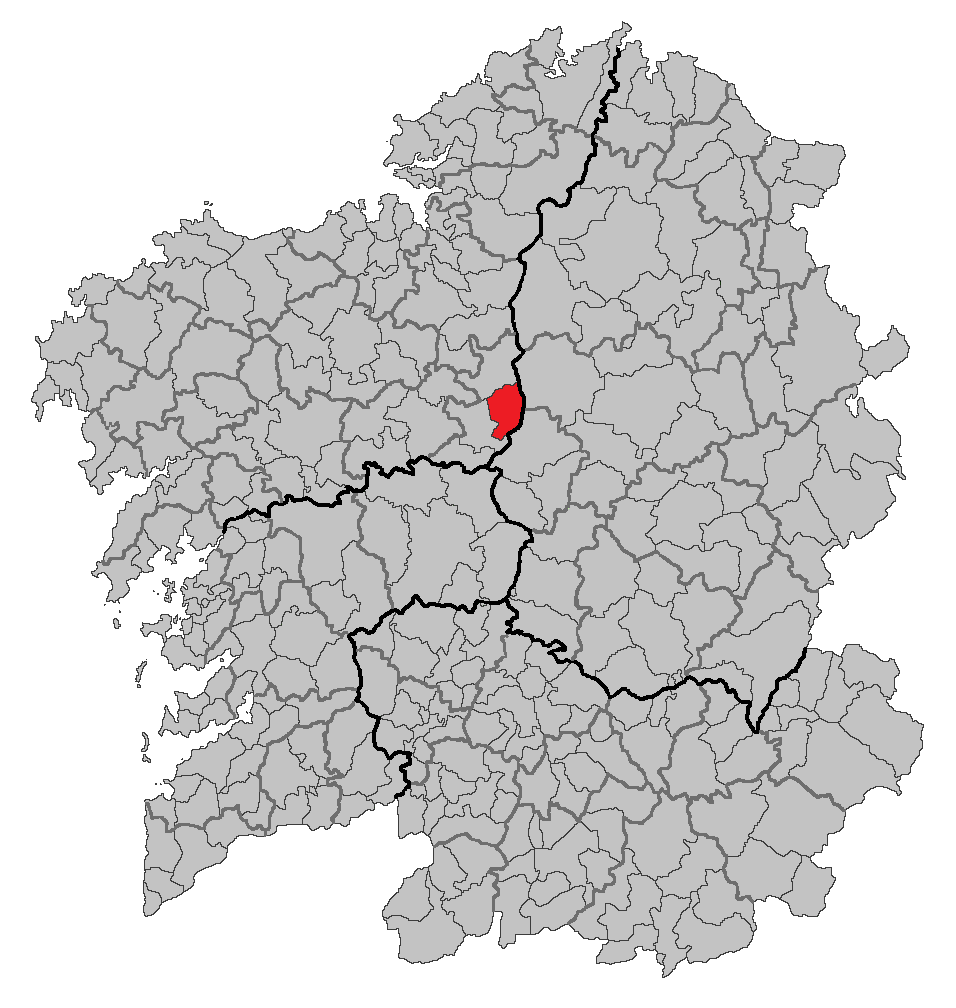
- Location of Toques

- Location in Spain
- Country: Spain
- Autonomous community: Galicia
- Province: A Coruña
- Comarca: Terra de Melide

Government
  - Alcalde: Jose Ángel Penas (Galician Nationalist Bloc)
- Demonym: Toquense
- Time zone: UTC+1 (CET)
  - Summer (DST): UTC+2 (CEST)
- Postal code: 15806
- Website: Official website

Toques is a municipality in the province of A Coruña in the autonomous community of Galicia, northwestern Spain. It has a population of 1580 (Spanish 2001 Census) and an area of 78 km^{2}.

== See also ==
List of municipalities in A Coruña
