= Terra de Melide =

Coordinates: 42.9333°N 8°W

- Comarca
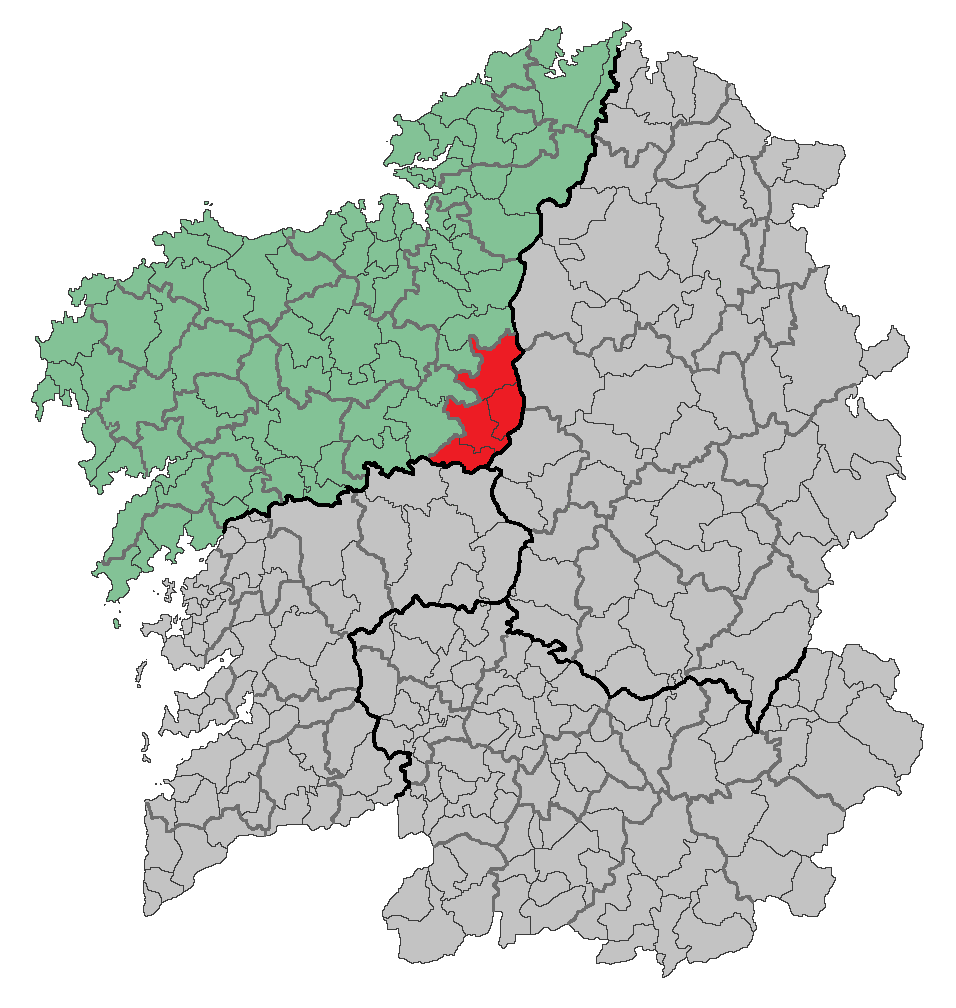
- Country: Spain
- Autonomous community: Galicia
- Province: A Coruña
- Capital: Melide
- Municipalities: List: Melide, Santiso, Sobrado, Toques

Area
  - Total: 370 km^{2} (140 sq mi)

Population (2019)
  - Total: 11,872
  - Density: 32/km^{2} (83/sq mi)
- Demonym: Mellidense
- Time zone: UTC+1 (CET)
  - Summer (DST): UTC+2 (CEST)

Terra de Melide is a comarca in the Galician Province of A Coruña. The overall population of this local region was 11,872 (2019).

== Municipalities ==
Melide, Santiso, Sobrado and Toques.
