= Melide, Spain =

Municipality in Galicia, Spain

Coordinates: 42°55′N 8°01′W

Melide
- Municipality
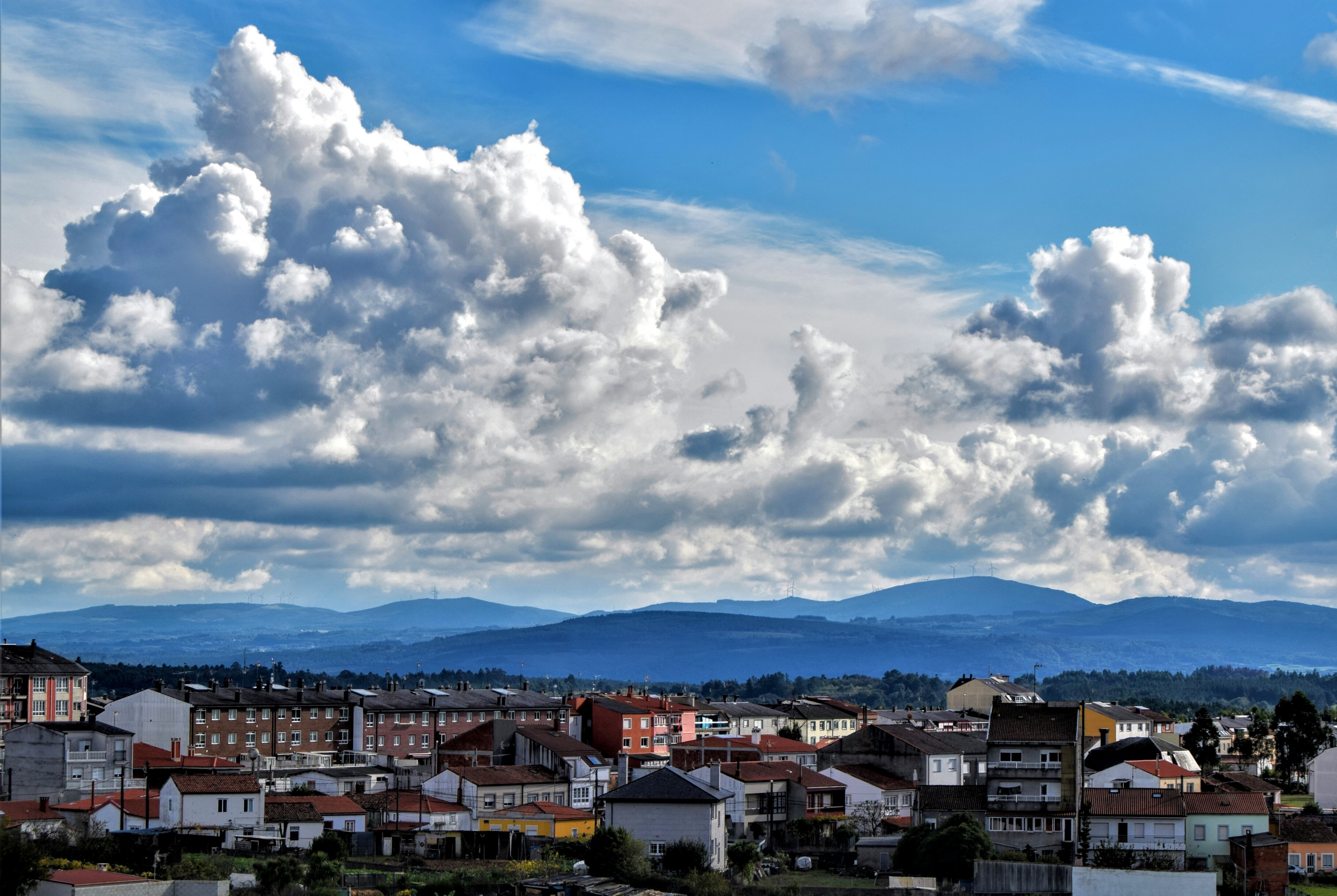

- Coat of arms

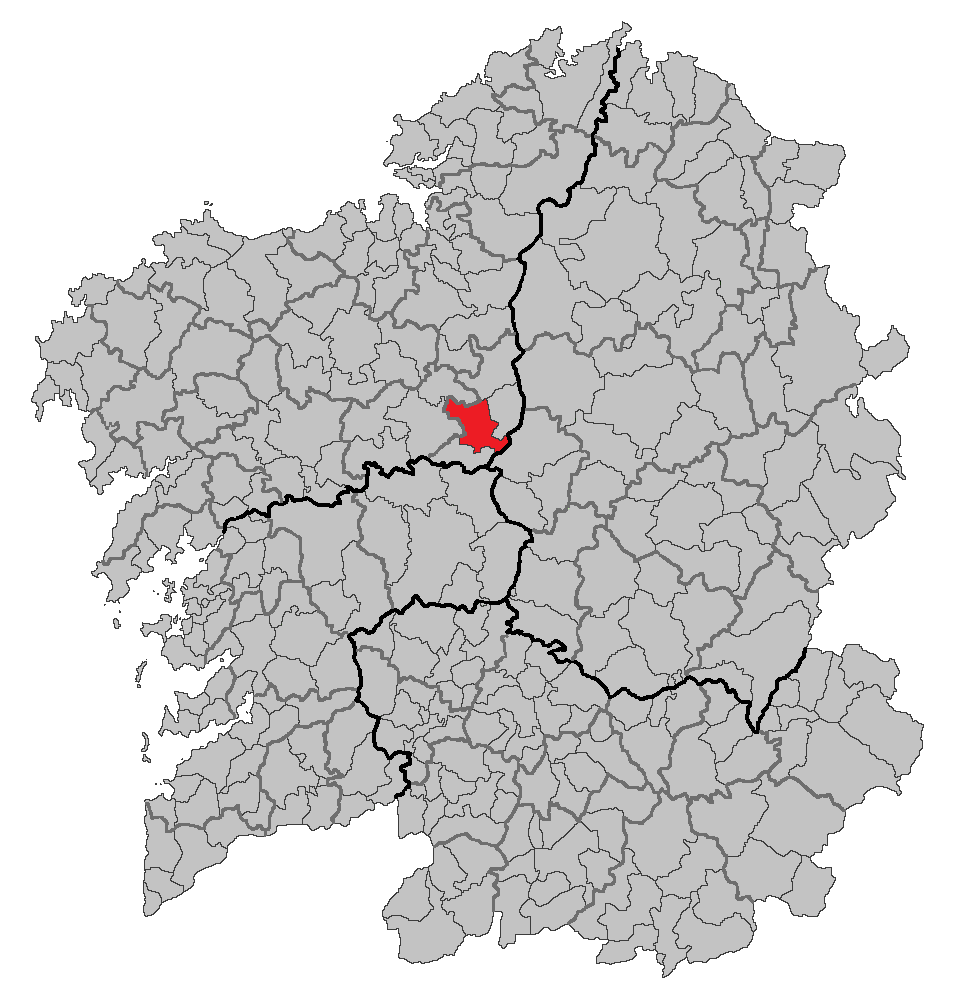
- Location of Melide

- Location in Spain
- Country: Spain
- Autonomous community: Galicia
- Province: A Coruña
- Comarca: Terra de Melide

Government
  - Alcalde: José Manuel Pérez Penas (Adiante Melide)
- Demonym(s): Melidense, melidao/melidá.
- Time zone: UTC+1 (CET)
  - Summer (DST): UTC+2 (CEST)
- Postal code: 15800
- Website: Official website

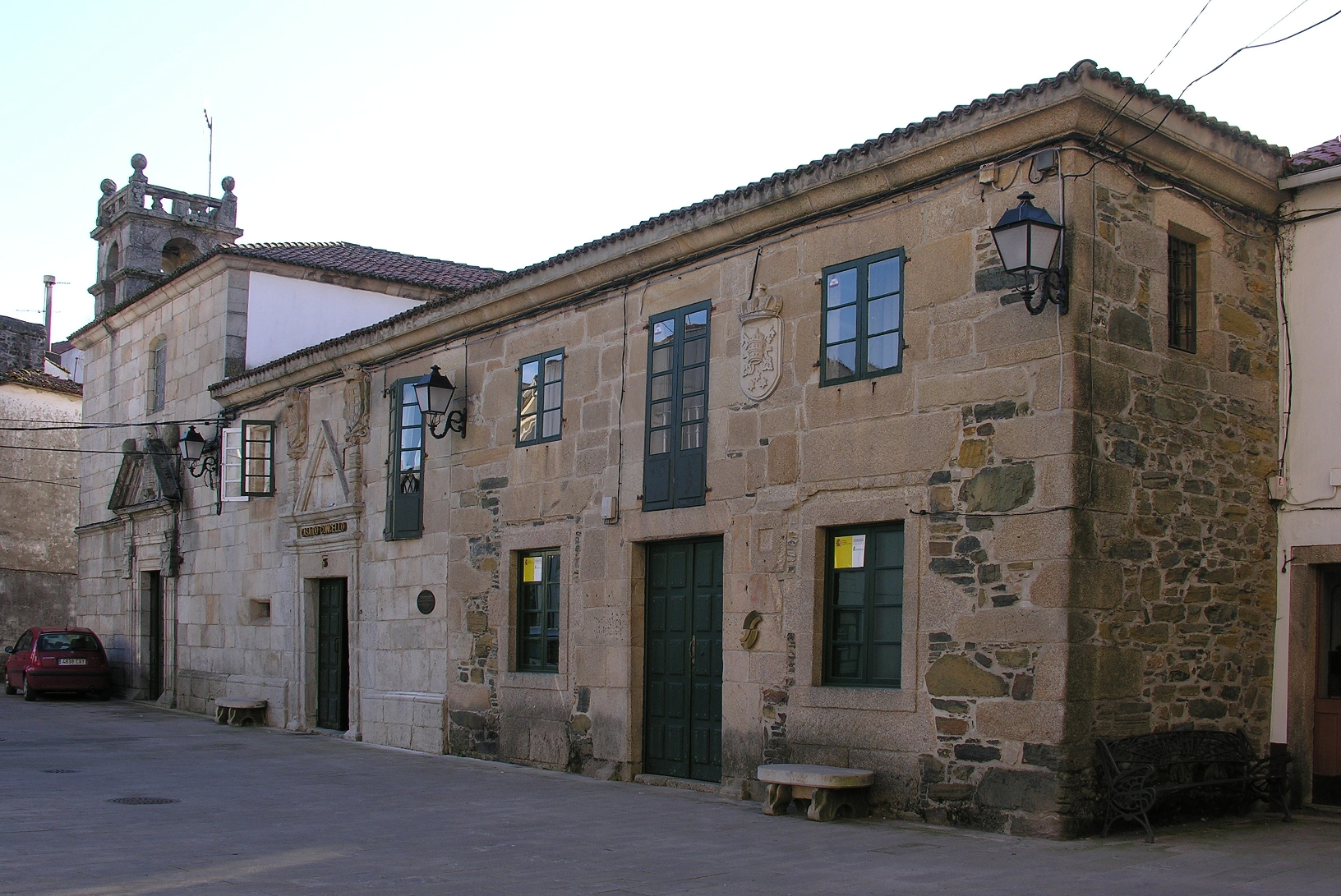
Ayuntamiento square of Melide

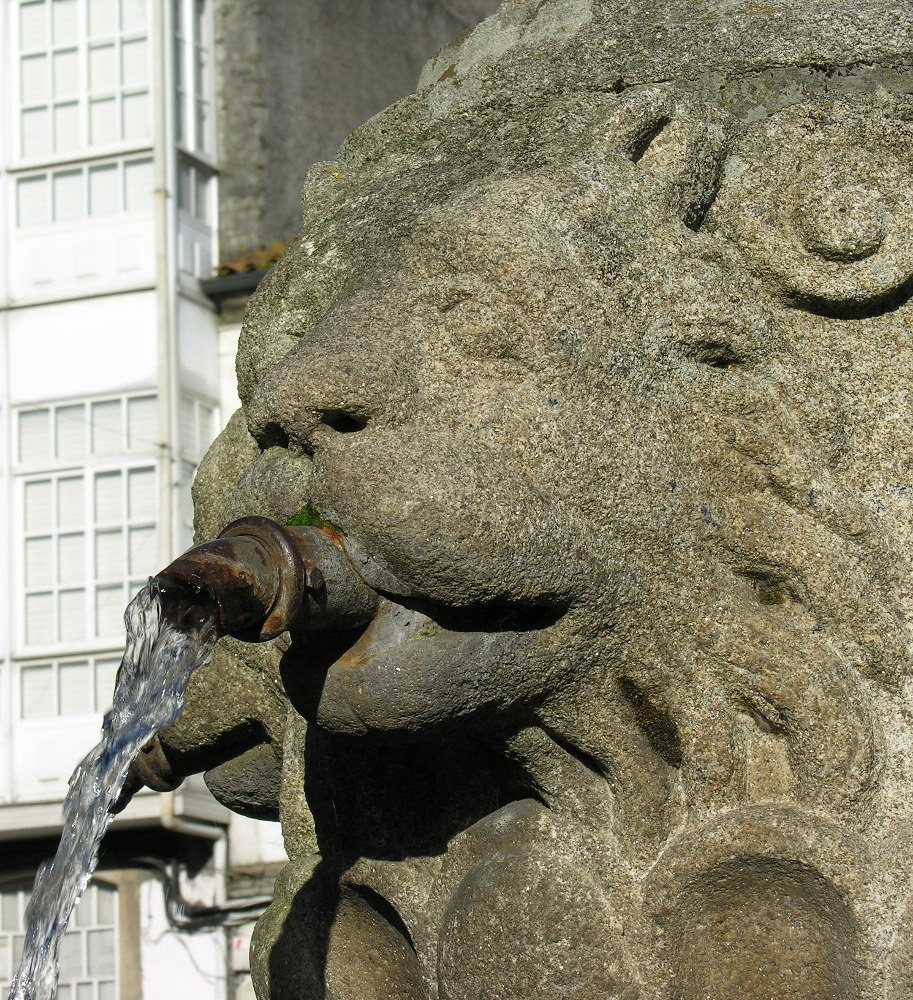
Old lion statue in Melide

Melide (Spanish: Mellid) is a municipality in the province of A Coruña in the autonomous region of Galicia in northwest Spain. It belongs to the comarca of Terra de Melide. It has an area of 101 km^{2} and a population of 7,734 inhabitants mostly spread among its 26 parishes. It has an elevation of 456 meters.

== Demography ==
From: INE Archiv

== History ==
The history of this village, since its foundation in the 10th century, is deeply linked with the pilgrimage to Santiago de Compostela as it is where two separate paths French Way and Camino Primitivo of the Camino de Santiago link up.

In 1320 Melide obtained from the Archbishop of Santiago, Berenguel de Landoira, the privilege of building up a castle, fortressing the village, and charging taxes. In 1467 "os irmandiños" opposed the Archbishop Alonso II Fonseca and started a series of fights against its power. During this riot the walls of the village were destroyed as well as the castle. After this, the Catholic Monarchs banned the construction of any fortress in the village.

During the last few centuries, like many villages in inner Galicia, it has suffered from a vast emigration of its people to Cuba and Argentina up to 1950s, and then to Switzerland, the United Kingdom, and to other cities of Spain such as Barcelona, Bilbao and A Coruña.

== Economy ==
Currently its economy is based on agriculture, meat processing, and, more recently, tourism.

== See also ==
List of municipalities in A Coruña

== Gallery ==
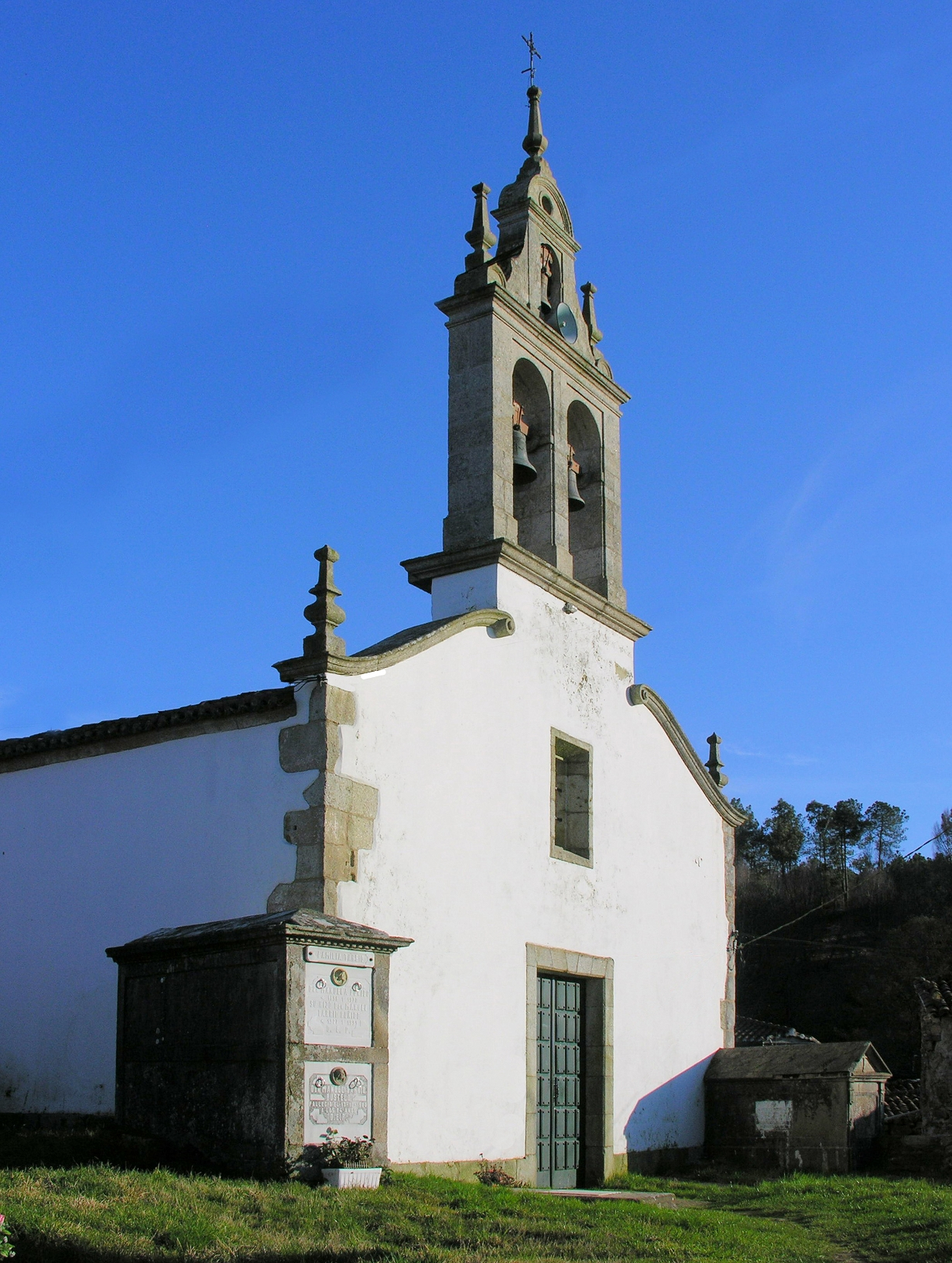
Furelos Church

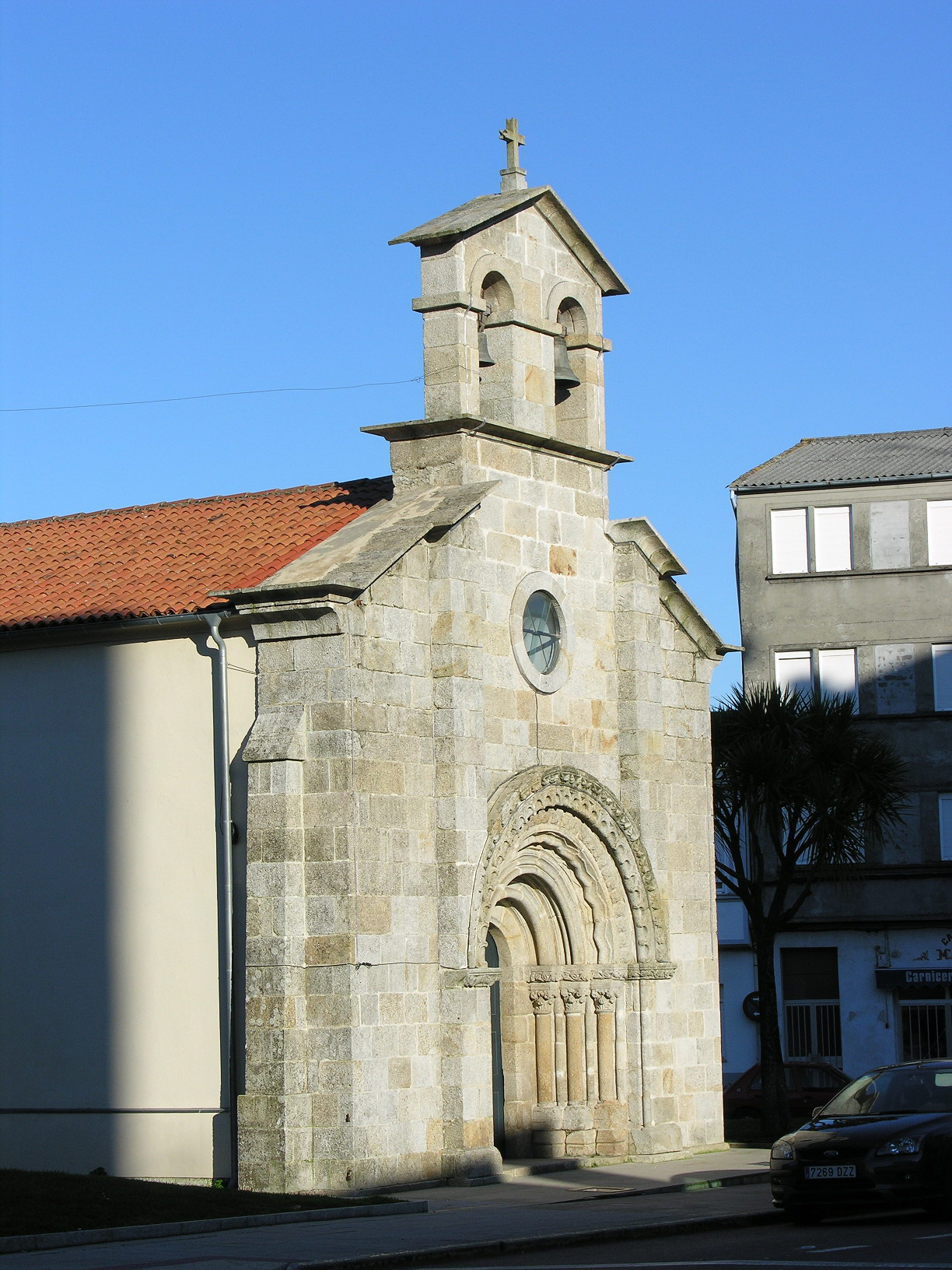
Santa María Church

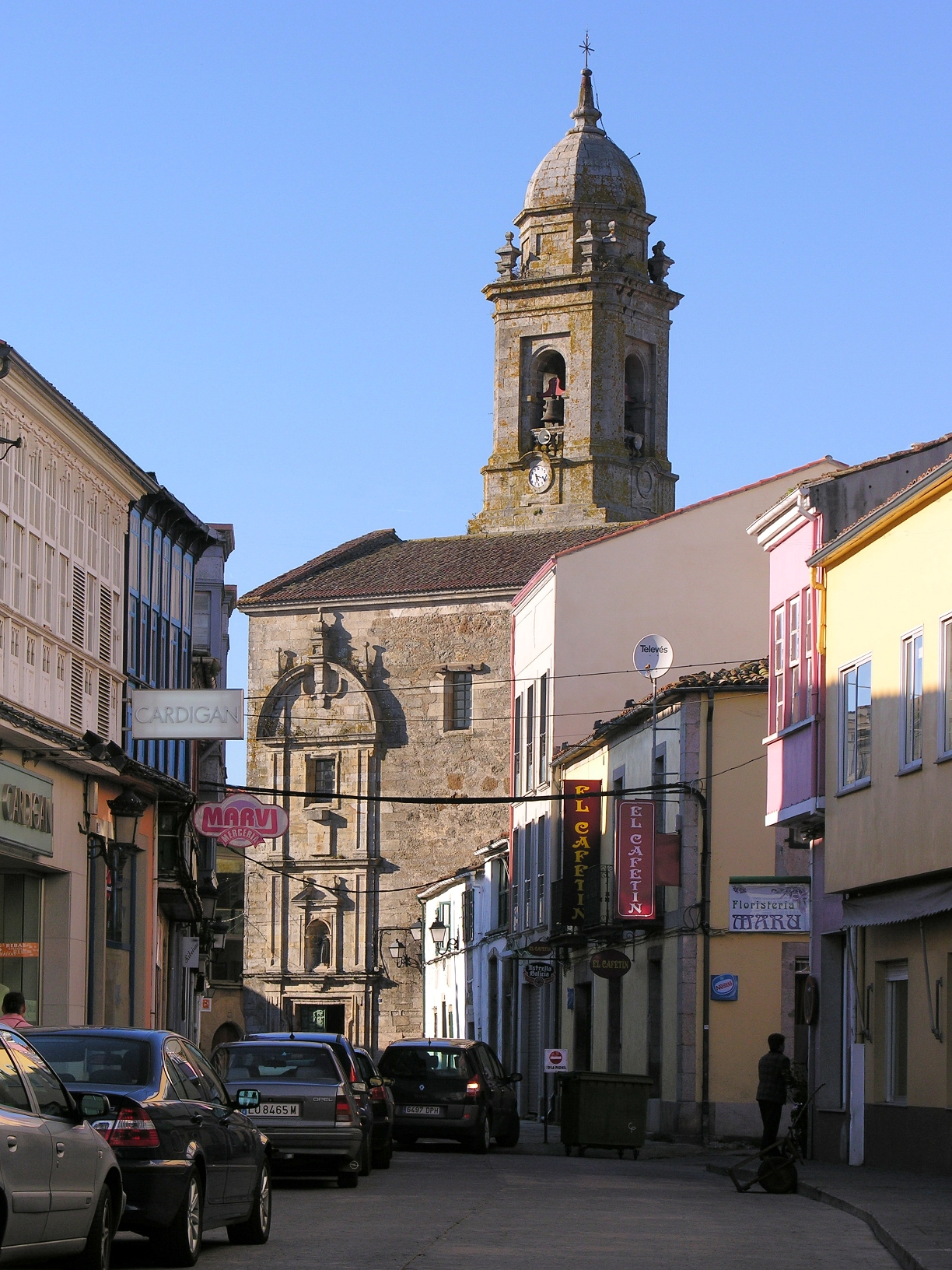
Church, Melide

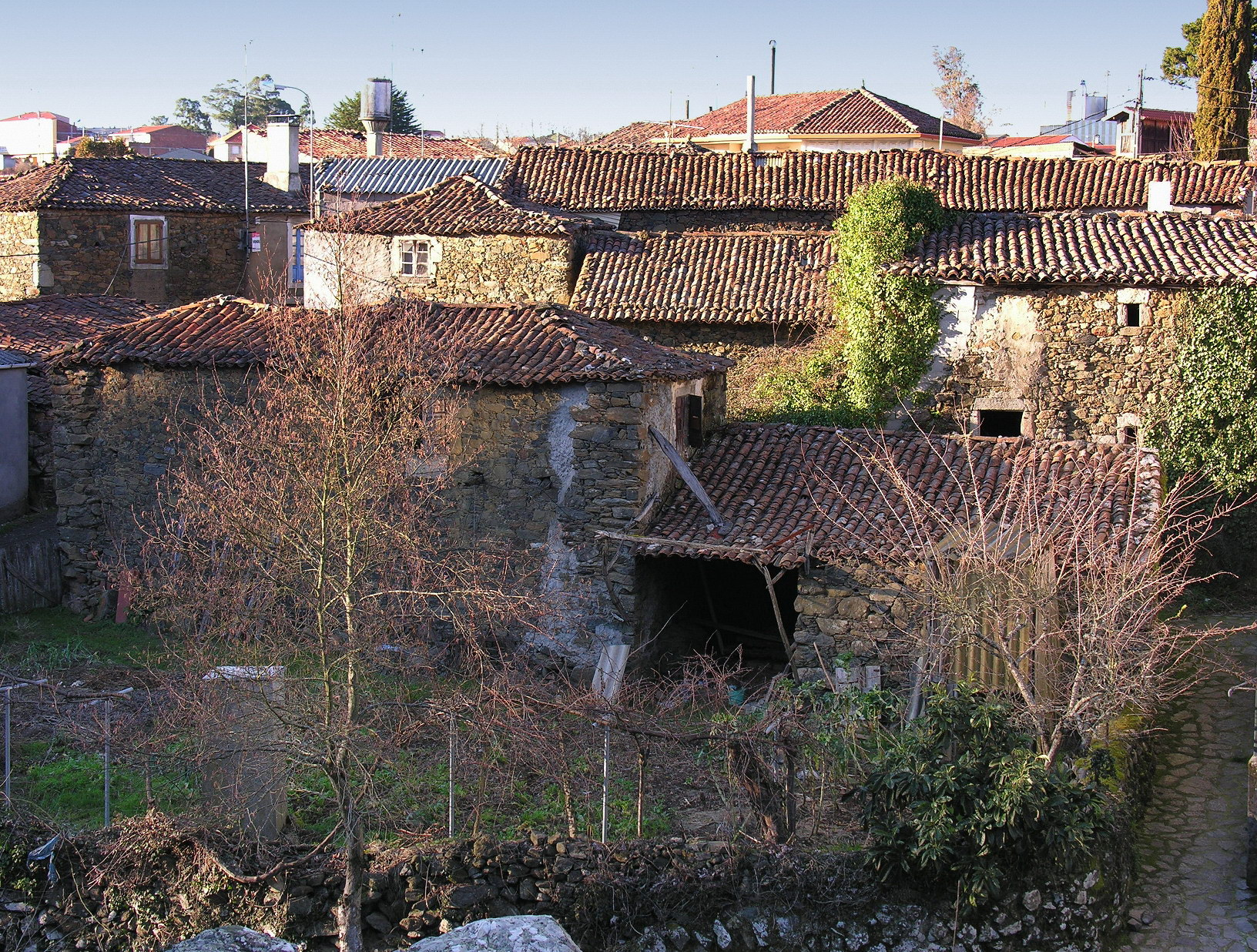
Furelos neighbourhood

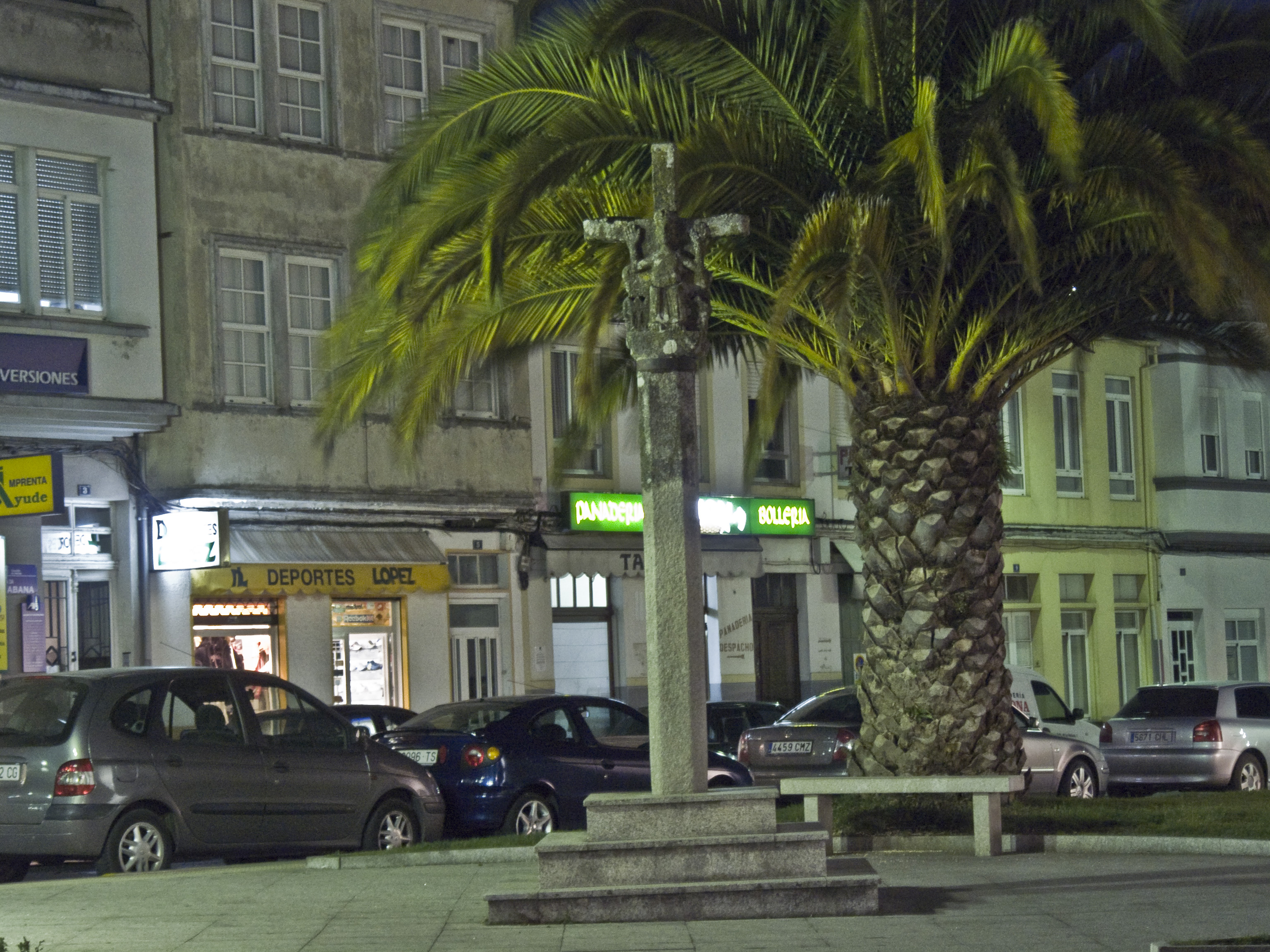
Cruceiro de Melide

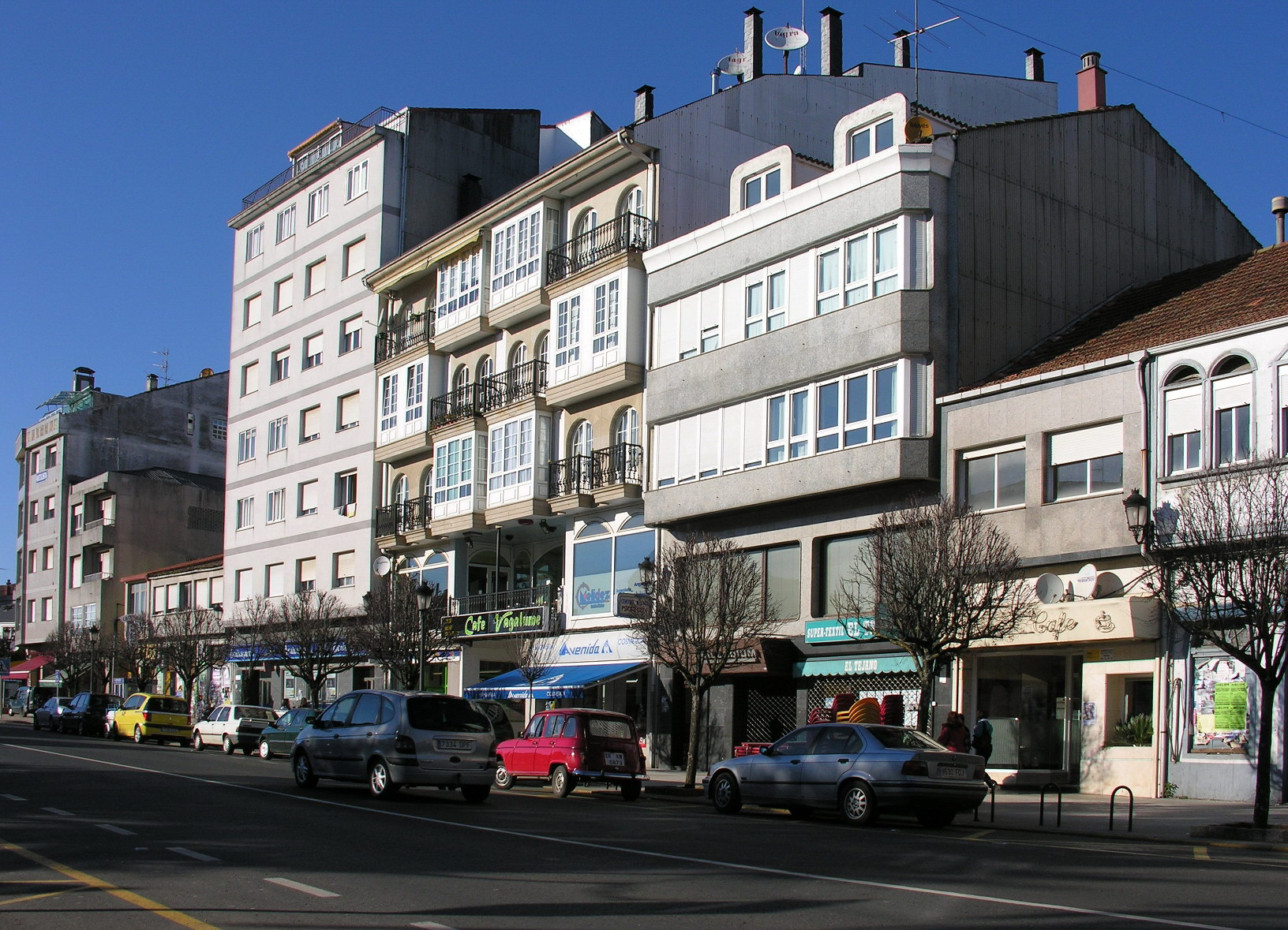
The center

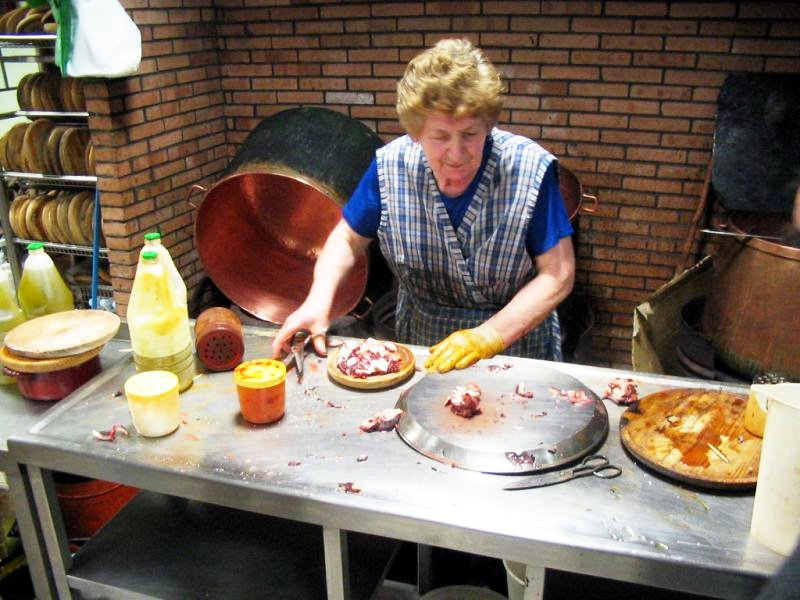
Cooking a "polbo á feira", a typical food in this town
