= Nendos =

Nendos or Nemitos was the name of a historic Galician territory in northwest Galicia. Its existence is documented from the 6th century in the Suebic Kingdom of Galicia, but due to its etymology, -derived from the Celtic name Nemeton, there are insidious of its existence in pre-Roman times. Nendos is still an ecclesiastical province in Galicia.
