= Sobrado, Galicia =

Sobrado
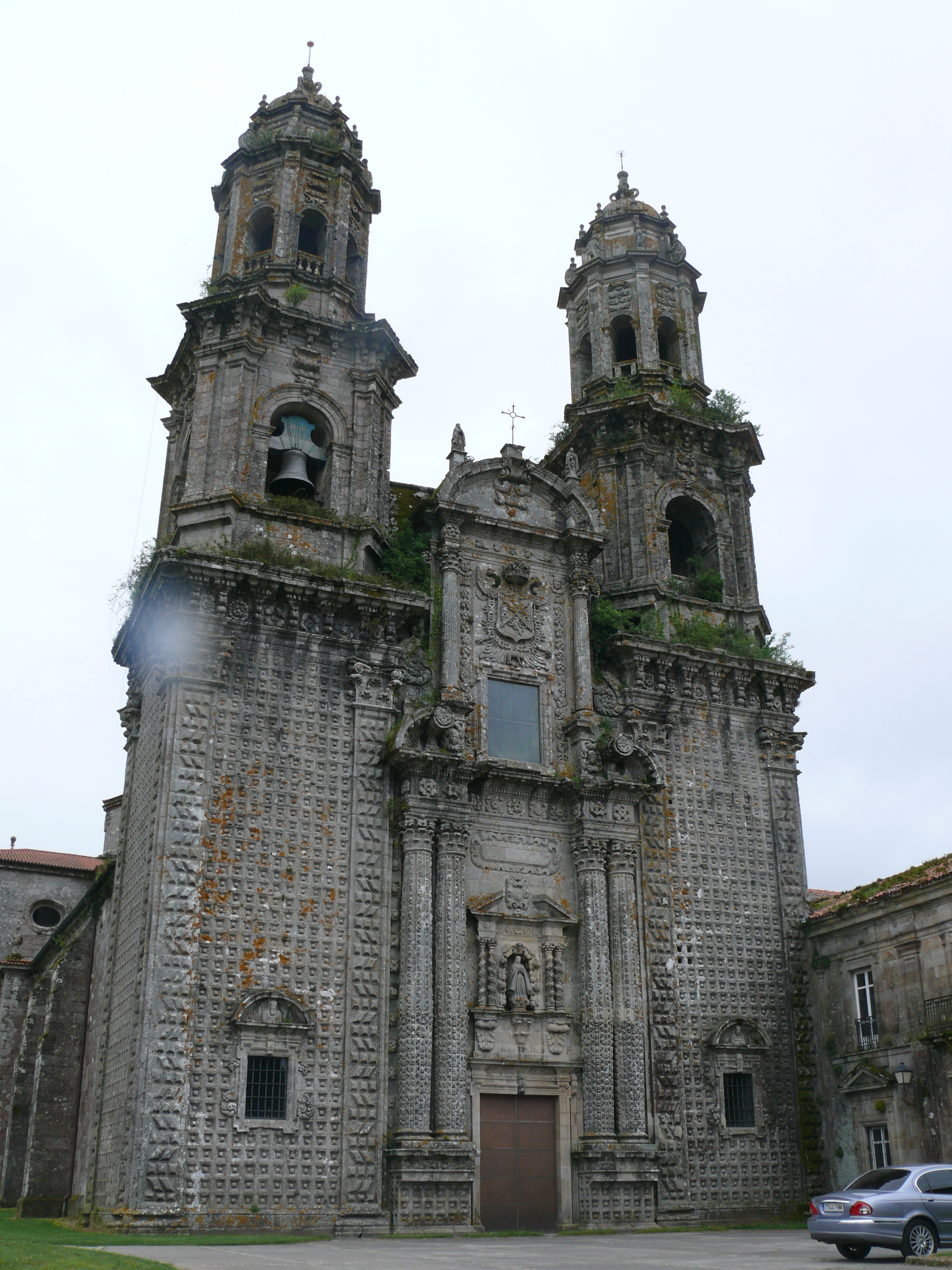
- Sobrado Abbey

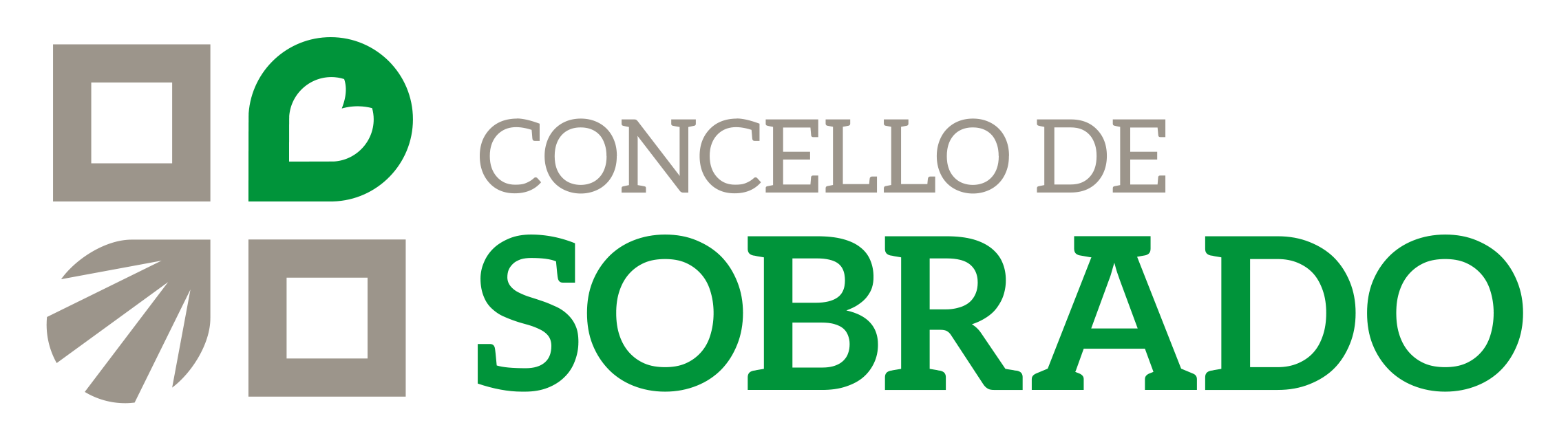
- Flag Seal Coat of arms

- Location within Spain
- Coordinates: 43.0224°N 8.0144°W
- Country: Spain
- Autonomous Community: (Galicia (Spain)) Galicia
- Province: A Coruña
- Comarca: Terra de Melide

Government
  - Type: Concello
  - Mayor: Xacobo Fernandez (PP)

Area
  - Total: 120.64 km^{2} (46.58 sq mi)
- Elevation: 510 m (1,670 ft)

Population (2025-01-01)
  - Total: 1,830
  - Density: 15.2/km^{2} (39.3/sq mi)
- Demonym(s): Sobradense (m),Sobradesa (f)
- Time zone: CET (GMT +1)
  - Summer (DST): CEST (GMT +2)
- Postcode: 15813
- Area code: +34
- ISO 3166-2: ES-C
- Website: http://www.sobrado.es

Sobrado is a municipality in the province of A Coruña, in the autonomous community of Galicia, Spain. It has a population of 2,087 (according to the 2011 Spanish Census) and an area of 121 km^{2}. Sobrado is well known because of Sobrado Abbey, a Trappist monastery. The town is known by the name Sobrado dos Monxes in Galician or Sobrado de los Monjes in Spanish but the official name is just Sobrado.

== Geography ==
=== Demographics ===
Historical population
Year	1930	1950	1981	1991	1996	2001	2008	2007
Pop.	5,583	6,459	3,466	2,894	2,706	2,402	2,360	2,244
±%	—	+15.7%	−46.3%	−16.5%	−6.5%	−11.2%	−1.7%	−4.9%

=== Climate and vegetation ===
The town of Sobrado, in its climatic characteristics (temperatures, precipitation, humidity, hours of direct sunlight) has a climate characteristic of the European Atlantic that means wet and cool, with heavy rainfall due to greater latitude within the autonomous region and the dorsal Galician screen acting for the Atlantic storms that discharge heavy rains on this side, approaching the annual average 1,400 mm.

Temperatures are a little more extreme, the result of the recession of the coastline and its position in the mountains and foothills. The average annual temperature is 8.4 °C, undergoes major changes, with highs in July to 33 °C and minimum in December to 3 °C below zero.

The vast majority of the municipal territory is devoted to forest plantations while the rest goes to the crop. The cultivated areas are devoted mainly to livestock related products, and overflowing the meadows and corn. The gardening plots are reduced to around homes and in a zone where the greenhouses are beginning to abound.

=== Orography ===
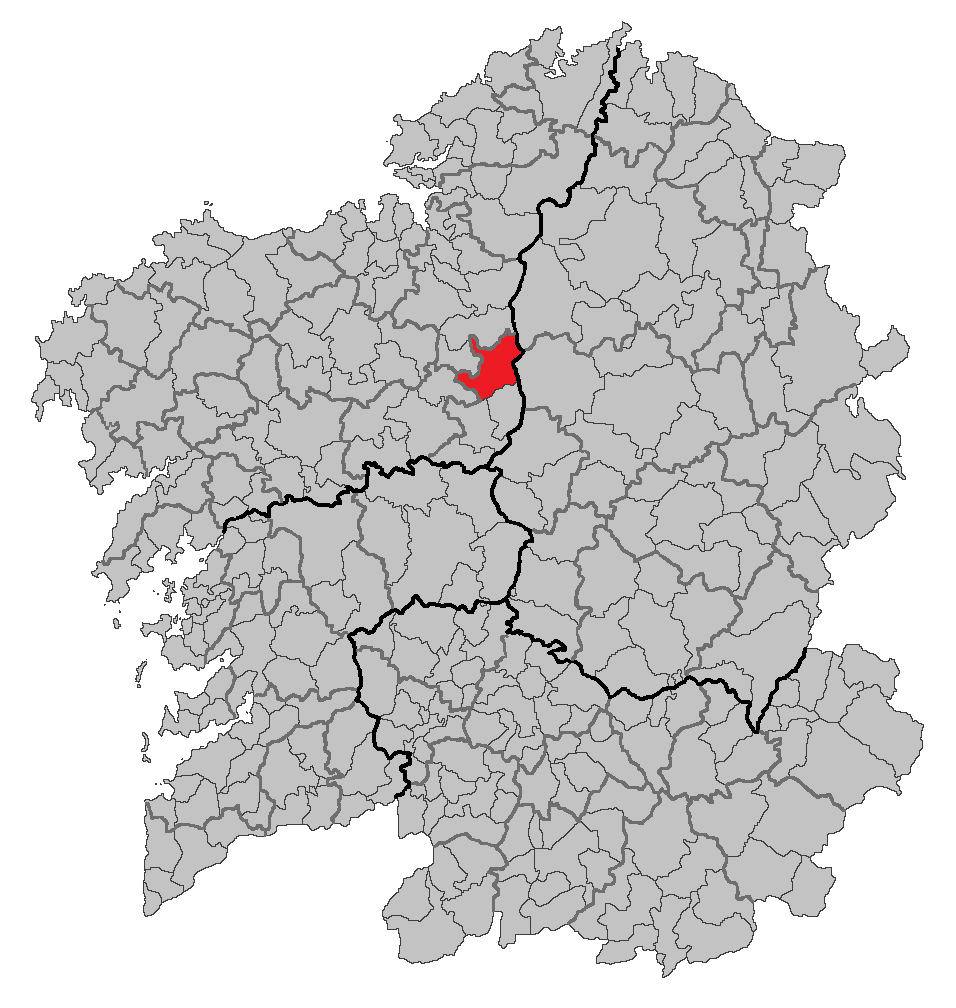
Location of Sobrado in Galicia.

From the physical standpoint, the municipality is located in a mountain area corresponding to the Dorsal Gallega. To the east and the south are the high points of the municipality, the Cova da Serpe mountains and hills do Corno do Boi in the east, and mountains do Bocelo in the south, where we find Megalithics rest like the dolmen of Forno dos Mouros and the "Pena da Moura" two round big rocks where are doubts and legends if it was the men who put the rocks there. These mountain systems are around 750 m altitude. They can locate Mount Campelo with 806 m and the mountain of Pilar with 801 m situated at the border of the province, and establishing superb views over the territory.

The western areas of the municipality is around 450 to 600 meters and the mountains become in little hills and valleys where most of the population lives.

=== Hydrography ===
Although the river network of the municipality is characterized by small rivers with low flow, typical of a region of mountain peaks.

In the Bocelo mountains have the head of the two major rivers of western Galicia: the Mandeo that slopes down to the Ria de Betanzos and Tambre flowing into the estuary of Muros and Noia.

== Historic heritage ==
=== Sobrado Abbey ===
A monastery is believed to have been founded on the site in the 10th century by the Benedictines. By the beginning of the 12th century it had been abandoned.

In 1142, it was re-founded as a Cistercian monastery from Clairvaux. During the 12th and 13th centuries it flourished and was able to undertake the foundations of its own daughter house, Valdedios Abbey in Asturia. Sobrado was also given the supervision of Monfero Abbey after it joined the Cistercian Order.

After a period of decline Sobrado was the first abbey in Galicia, in 1498, to join the Castilian Cistercian Congregation.

The monumental new Baroque abbey church was dedicated in 1708. Most of the conventual buildings were also rebuilt at this time.

The dissolution of the monasteries enforced by the government of Mendizábal in 1836 put an end to the abbey, and the abandoned buildings fell into decay.

In 1954 the Trappist monks of Viaceli Abbey in Cóbreces, west of Cantabria, began reconstruction, having already refounded and restored Huerta Abbey in 1929, and were able to resettle the monastery with a new Trappist community in 1966.

=== Roman Camp of Cidadela ===
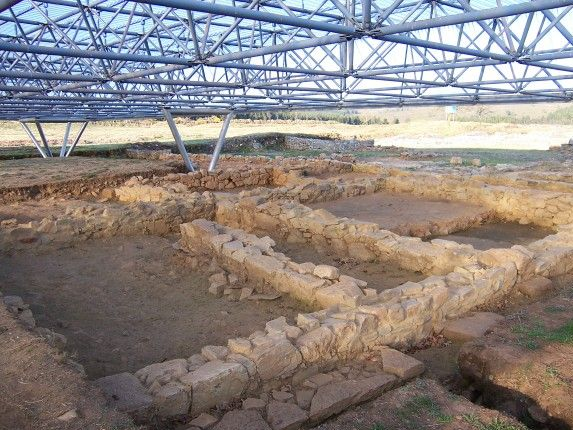
the Roman Camp of Cidadela

The camp is nestled on a plateau of 480 meters, is surrounded by the mountain of Serra da Corda, its height varies between 522 and 601 meters. The presence of the camp in this place is due to strategic reasons, such as controlling step the Roman road to "Lucus Augusti (Lugo). The camp is rectangular with rounded corners. Its dimensions are 172 meters long by 140 feet wide, equivalent to an area of 2.40 ha, which are appropriate measures for the training of a military unit five. This whole camp is protected by a wall and a moat and a number of control points located near the camp . The materials found at the camp are numerous coins ranging from the time of Domitian (86) to Claudius II (270), a wide range of glass, bronze, iron objects, construction of pottery, etc..

== Natural heritage ==
Sobrado has a rich natural heritage, with numerous rivers and lakes, one wet area declared of European interest, apart from numerous forest full of oak, chestnut, birch, etc.

=== The Lagoon ===
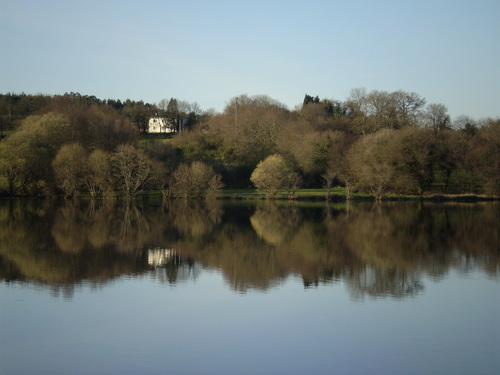
The Lagoon of Sobrado

The Lagoon of Sobrado has an artificial origin, built between 1500 and 1530 by monks damming the waters of some small rivers to irrigate lawns, move mills or dispose of fishing . The lagoon has a circular shape that covers an approximate area of 10 hectares, with an average depth of 1.5 meters to 4.5 meters high. It is situated at an altitude of 510 meters and has an annual change in their level of about 20 centimeters. It is a good representation of the lake ecosystem in which they live frogs, ducks, dragonflies, otters and cormorants and other species.

Sobrado Lagoon is home to Nitella flexilis, a freshwater alga that was first recorded at several locations in the Iberian Peninsula, including the lagoon. The surrounding vegetation includes birch, aldar, ash and willow trees. There are agricultural fields and woodland beyond the shoreline.

=== The "Casa do Gado" Oak forest ===
is a beautiful oak forest over the town of Sobrado where there are also chestnut, mistletoe, birch, pine etc. In the 1980s a film was shot in the forest.

The film is called the Living Forest(el bosque animado) and is based on a novel of a Galician writer Wenceslao Fernandez Florez

=== The 2nd oldest oak in Galicia ===
Situated in the village of Portacal (Cumbraos), is an oak ranked as the 2nd oldest in Galicia according to the SGHN Galicia (Galician Society of Natural History).

== See also ==
List of municipalities in A Coruña
