= Vikings in Iberia =

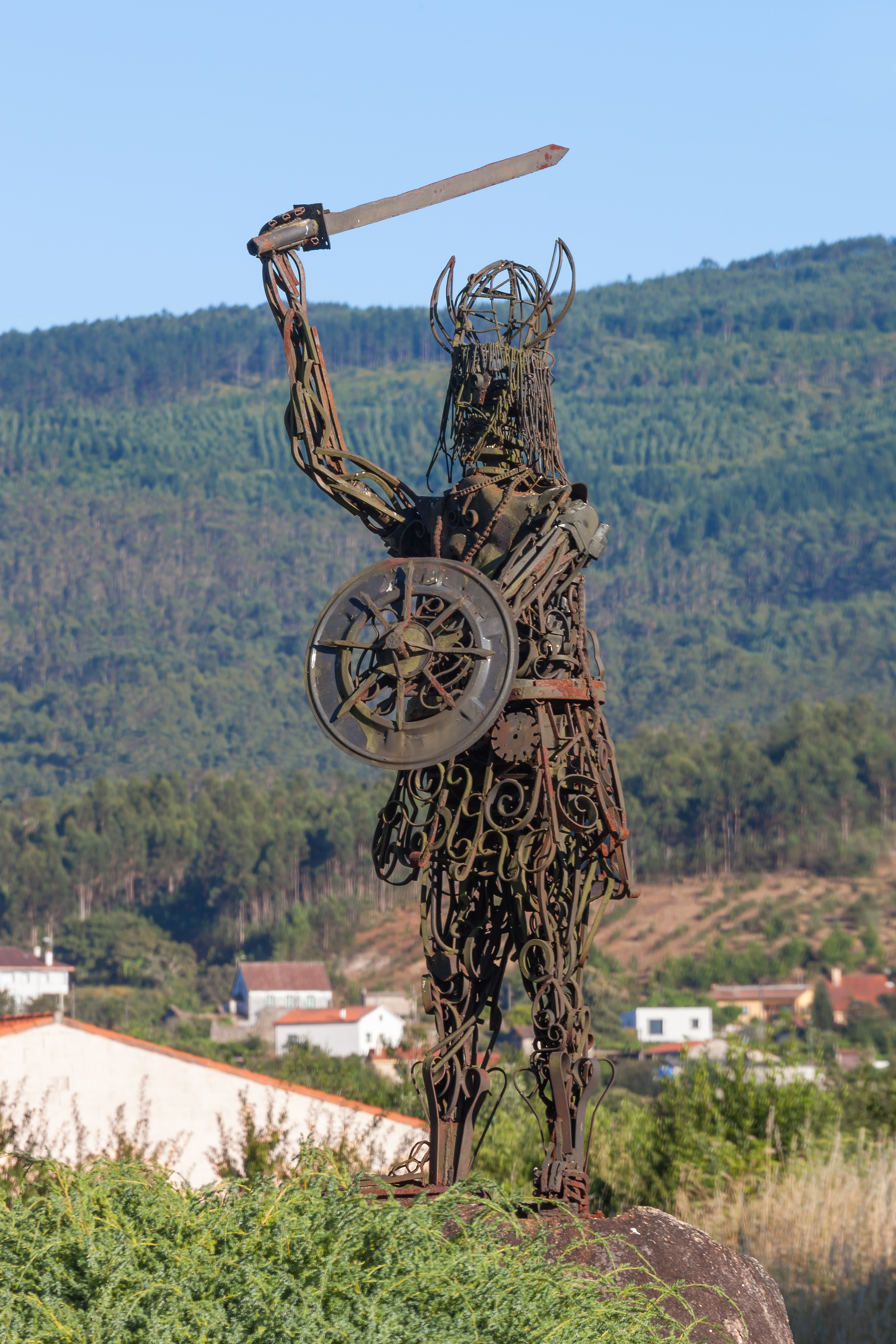
Modern sculpture of a Viking in Catoira.

Viking activity in the Iberian peninsula seems to have begun around the mid-9th century as an extension of Viking raids and the establishment of bases in Francia in the early 9th century. While connections between the Norse and eastern Islamic lands were well-established, particularly involving the Rus' along the Volga and around the Caspian Sea, relations with the western edge of Islam were more sporadic. Although Vikings may have over-wintered in Iberia, no evidence has been found for trading or settlement. Indeed, the Iberian peninsula may not have offered particularly wealthy targets in the 9th to 10th centuries. Sporadic raiding continued until the end of the Viking Age.

The knowledge of Vikings in Iberia is mainly based on written accounts. There are archaeological findings of what may have been anchors of Viking ships, and some shapes of mounds by riversides look similar to the Norse longphorts in Ireland. These may have been ports or docks for longships. Since 1961, the Viking Festival of Catoira in Pontevedra reenacts a Viking troop landing on their shores.

== Terminology ==
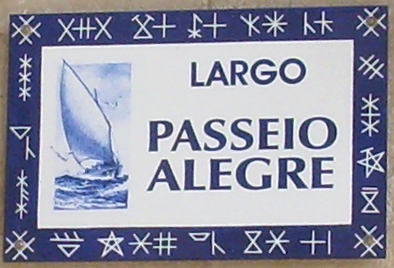
A street plate in Póvoa de Varzim, Portugal, with Siglas poveiras (describing names of local families), supposedly related to Scandinavian Bomärken.

In medieval Latin sources about Iberia, the Vikings are usually referred to as normanni ('northmen') and gens normannorum or gens nordomannorum ('race of the northmen'), along with forms in l- like lordomanni apparently reflecting nasal dissimilation in local Romance languages, or others which have an obscure etymology, as leodemanorum or lotimanorum, frequent in Galician charters. In Arabic sources, they are referred to as majūs (مَجوس), but as this term denoted a wide range of pagans, references to majūs in Arabic are not necessarily references specifically to Scandinavian raiders. The prominent early Arabic source Al-Mas'ūdī also identified the 844 raiders on Seville partly as Rūs and (probably borrowing from Iberian Latin lordomanni) al-lawdh'āna, which may more specifically indicate Scandinavian raiders.

== Non-violent contact ==
Aside from Viking raids in the Islamic Mediterranean, it has been imagined that there were also sustained diplomatic relations between the Vikings and the Islamic world. However, the key evidence, a 13th-century account by Ibn Diḥya in which an Arab diplomat Al-Ghazāl ("the gazelle") is dispatched to a pagan court during the reign of Abd-ar-Raḥman II, has been shown neither clearly to refer to Vikings nor probably even to have happened. It is accepted, however, that in the 10th century the Jewish Hispano-Arabic merchant Ibrahim ibn Yakub Al-Tartushi travelled to the Scandinavian trading town of Hedeby.

As Scandinavians converted to Christianity and formed stable kingdoms, particularly around the 11th century, opportunities for contact with Iberia changed, still involving raiding but also opportunities for visits associated with crusading or pilgrimage. One elegant example, portrayed in the 13th-century Orkneyinga saga, is Røgnvaldr kali Kolsson who recites this verse amongst others to Ermengarde, Viscountess of Narbonne:

Orð skal Ermingerðar
ítr drengr muna lengi;
brúðr vill rǫkk, at riðim
Ránheim til Jórðánar.
En er aptr fara runnar
unnviggs og haf sunnan,
rístum, heim at hausti,
hvalfrón til Nerbónar.

Translation:

In the Earl's ear the words
of Ermingard will echo,
enjoining us to journey
by water to Jordan.
But when the sea-riders
race back from the river,
as we navigate northward
we'll call at Narbonne.

== First raid, 844 ==
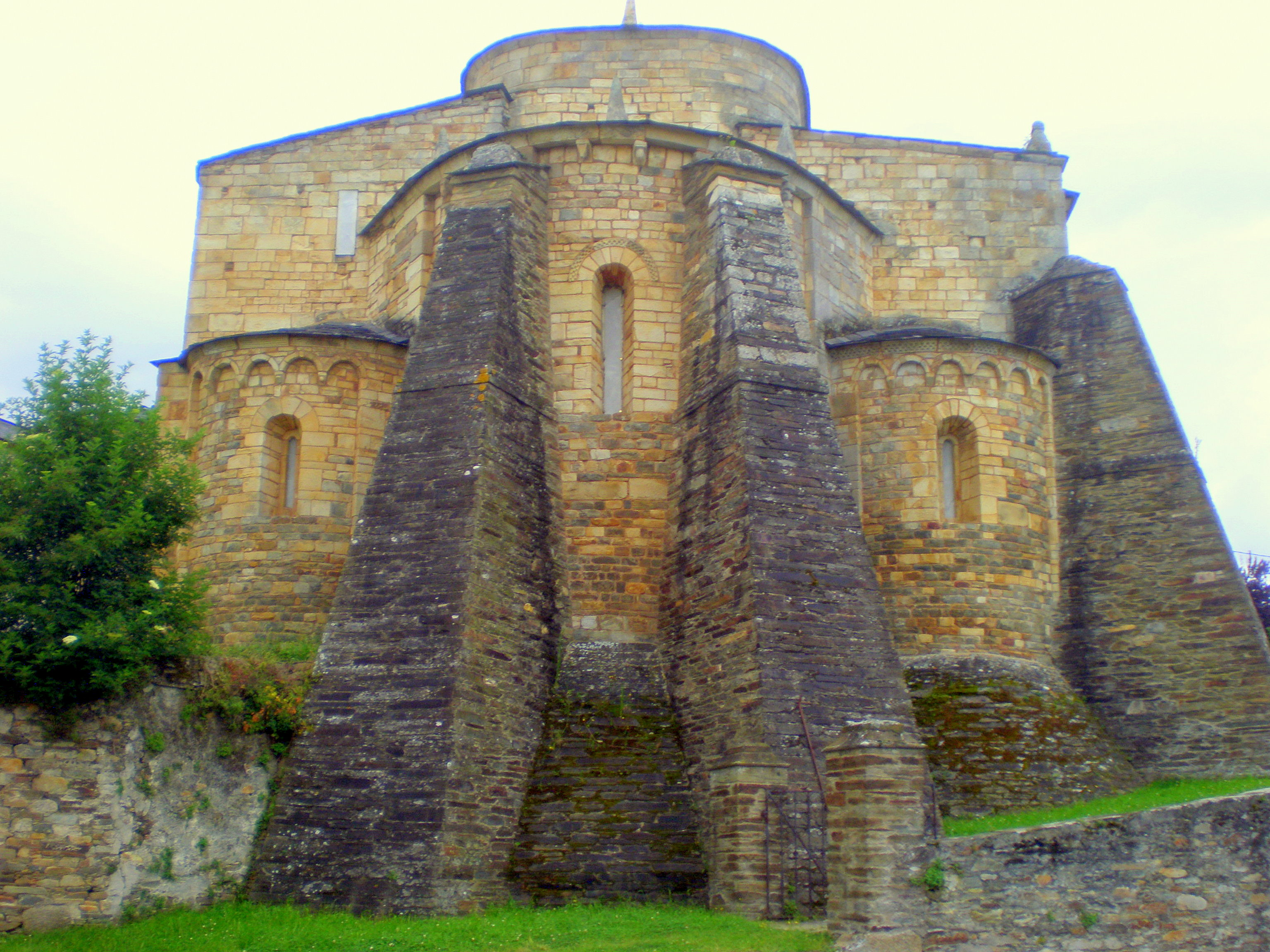
Ancient cathedral of St. Martin of Mondoñedo, near the mouth of the Masma river

The first incursion of the Vikings in Iberia has been characterised as "probably the most significant episode of the whole period of Viking activity in the South." It is mentioned in Annales Bertiniani and dated August 844, when a group from a plundering expedition entered the Garonne and reached Galicia. Despite storm damage, some proceeded to south-west Spain. This account is consistent with several later independent sources in Latin and Arabic. In particular, the late 9th- or early 10th-century Chronicle of Alfonso III adds that after plundering a number of coastal villages they were ultimately repulsed in the vicinity of Farum Brecantium (Tower of Hercules). Ramiro I of Asturias gathered troops in Galicia and Asturias for the counter-attack. After the Asturian victory, the Vikings continued their voyage toward Lisbon. While some authors consider that the reliability of this chronicle is open to doubt, others consider that other local chronicles confirm the arrival of the Norsemen.

Evidence for the subsequent development of the raid mainly comes from later Arabic-language sources. The earliest and most important of these, despite a number of implausible details, is Ibn al-Qūṭiyya. Overall, it seems clear that after their raid on Galicia and Asturias, the Vikings proceeded south, raiding Lisbon and Seville. In the assessment of Ann Christys, "that is perhaps as much as we can say for certain." However, the raid on Seville has attracted extensive scholarship in which researchers have attempted to extract a fuller history from late sources.

A local Galician legend claims that when the Vikings arrived at the mouth of the river Masma in northern Galicia, Gonzalo, the holy Bishop of the local diocese of Britonia, prayed from atop of a hill prayed for protection from the heavens against the forthcoming attack: a major storm was unleashed, sinking most of the flotilla but a ship that could flee to warn the rest of the fleet. A series of early medieval rock castles placed atop hills and mountains with large visual field over the ocean, extending along the coasts of Galicia, have been tentatively identified as temporary shelters and watchtowers built by local communities or lords against Norse raids.

== Second raid, 859-61 ==
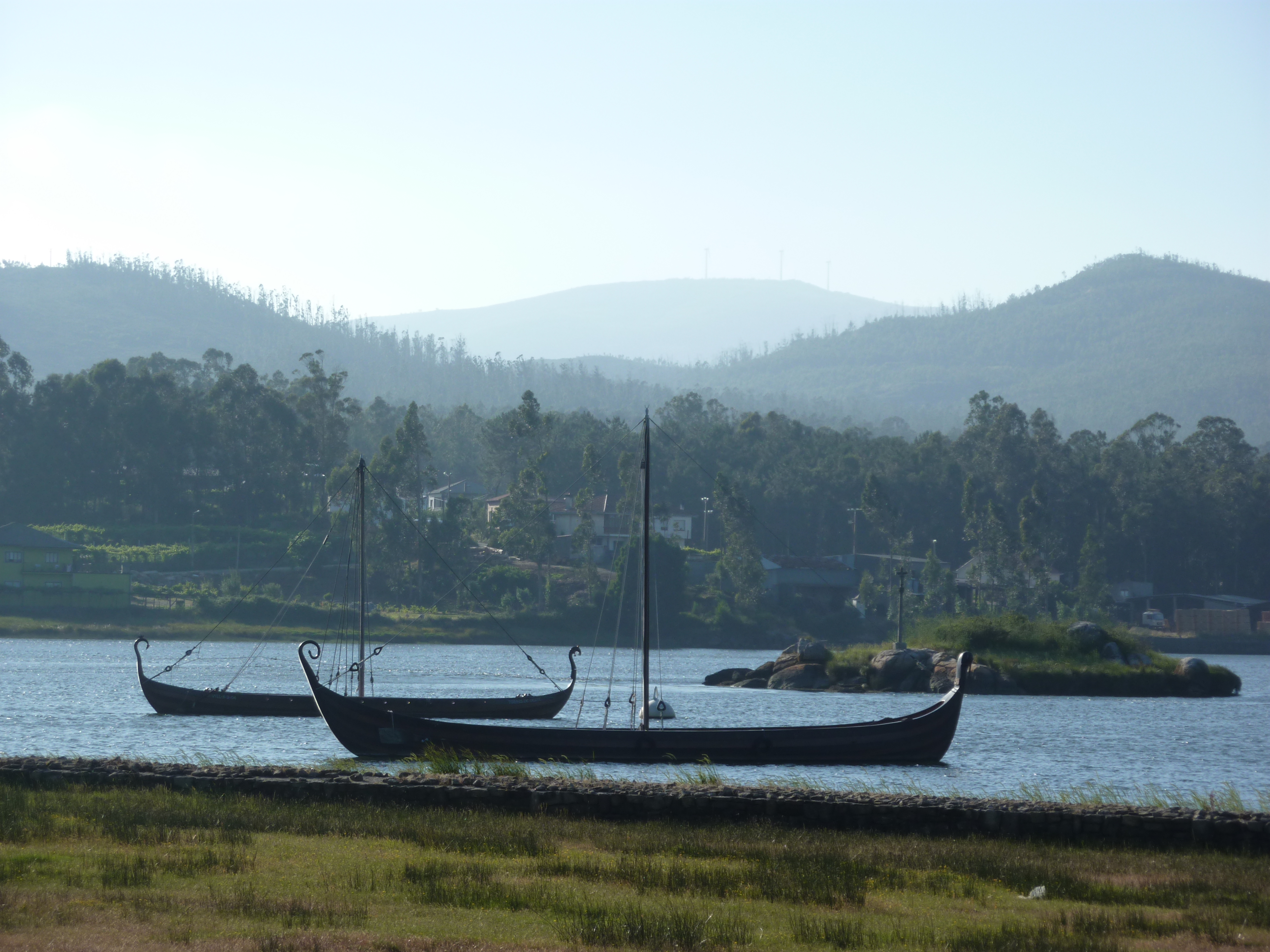
Viking longship replicas at Catoira, Galicia

Vikings returned to Galicia in 859, beginning what seems to have been a three-year campaign, during the reign of Ordoño I of Asturias. The main source for these events are Arabic histories compiled by Ibn Ḥayyān in the 11th century, though some near-contemporary Latin sources also mention the events, and later Latin sources offer more elaborate but less reliable accounts. In the assessment of Ann Christys, what can be known about the Viking raids on Iberia in 859-61 is that

The expedition of 859–861, like that of 844, seems to have involved a single band of adventurers. Returning to the scene of Viking incursions in northern Iberia and al-Andalus, but meeting with little success, they sailed on to raid targets on the shores of the Mediterranean. Here they may have taken captives for ransom or to trade as slaves. Vikings seem to have over-wintered in Francia, perhaps waiting on the northern shore of the Mediterranean for favourable tides and currents to exit the sea through the Straits of Gibraltar. They may even have sailed to Italy, Alexandria and Constantinople.

Some historians have given credence, however, to a range of accounts in late sources about raids in this period as evidence for this Viking incursion. Yet different sources mention different figures; not all potentially relevant raids recounted were necessarily by Vikings; and the sources are likely more to reflect the political context in which they were composed than actual events in 859–61. For example, on the basis of an account by Al-Bakrī it has been supposed that in 859 or 860, Vikings sailed through Gibraltar and raided the Emirate of Nekor and defeated a Moorish army. The raiders have been identified as the legendary Hastein and Björn Ironside, but this is based on modern extrapolation from unreliable medieval sources. There was a well-attested raid on Constantinople in 860, which may have been by Vikings and which has been associated with the raids on Iberia, but there is no evidence that the raid on Constantinople was by the same people who were active in the western Mediterranean at the time. Moreover, it is plausible that the Constantinople raiders came from the north by the river routes running from the Baltic into the Black Sea (known in Old Norse as the Austrvegr). A story about an attack in the period 859–61 on Banbalūna (which could mean modern Pamplona but also the whole kingdom of Navarre) may or may not reflect activities of Vikings.

== Raids in the 960s and 970s ==
Evidence for Viking activity in Iberia after 861 is sparse for nearly a century: while often late, and perhaps reflecting later efforts to construct histories of Viking depredation for contemporary political gain, a range of sources including Dudo of Saint-Quentin, Ibn Ḥayyān, and Ibn Idhārī, along with charters from Christian Iberia, together afford convincing evidence for Viking raids on Iberia in the 960s and 970s.

Among the stories recounted in later sources about these events, the Chronicle of Sampiro and later sources portray a raid in 968 led by Gundered: a fleet of a hundred ships of Norsemen and Flemings arrives at the port of Iuncaria, intending to pillage Iria, but the Vikings are met at Fornelos by the armies of Bishop Sisnando Menéndez, who is killed in the battle. After three years devastating and pillaging the land, they are defeated at the Cebreiro mountains by Gonzalo Sánchez, who might be identifiable as either Count Gonzalo Sánchez, or, according to some authors, as William Sánchez of Gascony. Bishop Sisnando was responsible for the fortification of Santiago de Compostela, allegedly against the raids of Norse, Flemings, and other enemies who used to raid the lands and shores of Galicia. Several Galician charters of later decades relate the destruction of monasteries and the suffering of the people as "dies Nordemanorum" ("day of the Northmen"); in particular one charter dated in 996 uses the location of an ancient fortress of the Norse, on the south bank of the Ulla river, as a landmark.

According to Ibn Idhārī, in 966 Lisbon was raided by the Norse with a fleet of 28 ships, but they were successfully repulsed. He recounts further raids in Al-Andalus, in a series of annalistic asides to narratives of events in Córdoba, for 971–72; these records chime with a note in the textually related and not necessarily reliable, Anales Complutenses and the first group of the Anales Toledanos saying that Vikings attacked Campos (believed to refer to either Santiago or to the Campos Goticos in the province of Leon) in 970. These activities are vaguely consonant with two 13th-century Scandinavian sources for the life of Eiríkr Blóðøx (the Historia Norwegiae and Ágrip) situating his death (implicitly in the 950s) in Spain while raiding. These two texts are not, however, representative of other accounts of Eiríkr's death (which is usually put in England), and they are unlikely to reflect 10th-century reality. Likewise, the probably 13th-century Knýtlinga saga imagines Úlfr raiding Galicia in the late 10th century.

== Raids in the 11th century ==
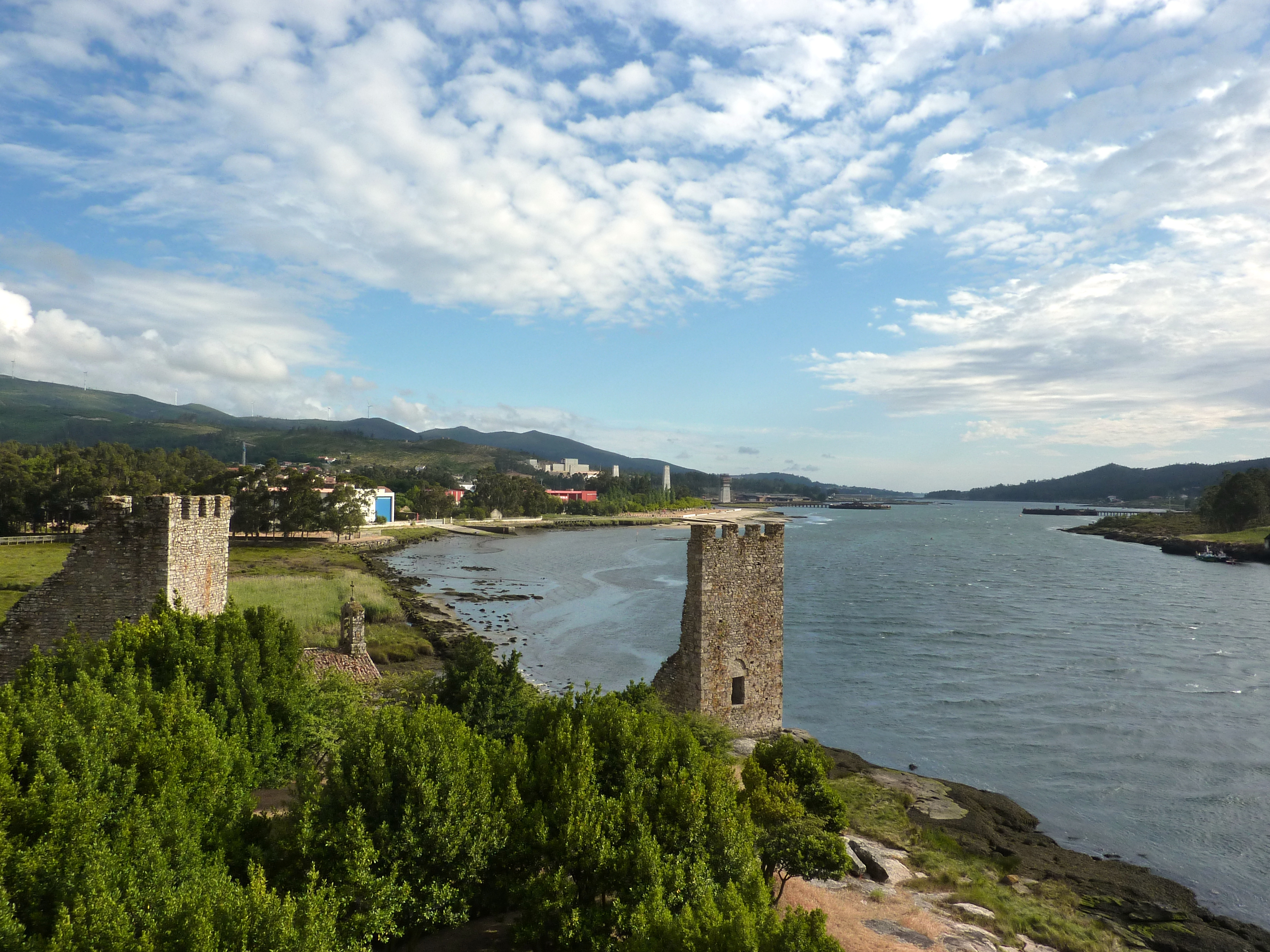
The Torres de Oeste were built circa 1020 to protect the seaways into Santiago de Compostela, Galicia

Quite extensive evidence for Viking raids in Iberia continues for the early 11th century. The 12th-century Chronicon Lusitanum claims Viking raids for 1008 and 1016, while the 13th-century Heimskringla portrays Óláfr Haraldsson, who later became king Olaf II of Norway, raiding Iberia en route to Jerusalem in 1015, striking settlements that might correspond to Castropol, Betanzos, Rivas de Sil and Tui. Although the reliability of these narratives is unproven, a 1015 charter records Amarelo Mestáliz selling land in northern Portugal to clear a debt incurred by ransoming his daughters:

a great number of Vikings (Lotnimis) arrived in July and occupied the territory between the river Douro and river Ave for nine months. These Vikings (Leodemanes) captured my three daughters, called Serili, Ermesenda and Faquilo, and reduced me to poverty, for, when they were about to sell their captives, I had no choice but to pay to Vikings (Lotmanes) a ransom of silver for them.

Likewise a few years later the crew of a barca de Laudomanes (Portuguese for "ship of Vikings") in the Douro, took the following ransom for a woman called Meitilli and her daughter: a cloak, a sword, a shirt, three pieces of linen, a cow and some salt.

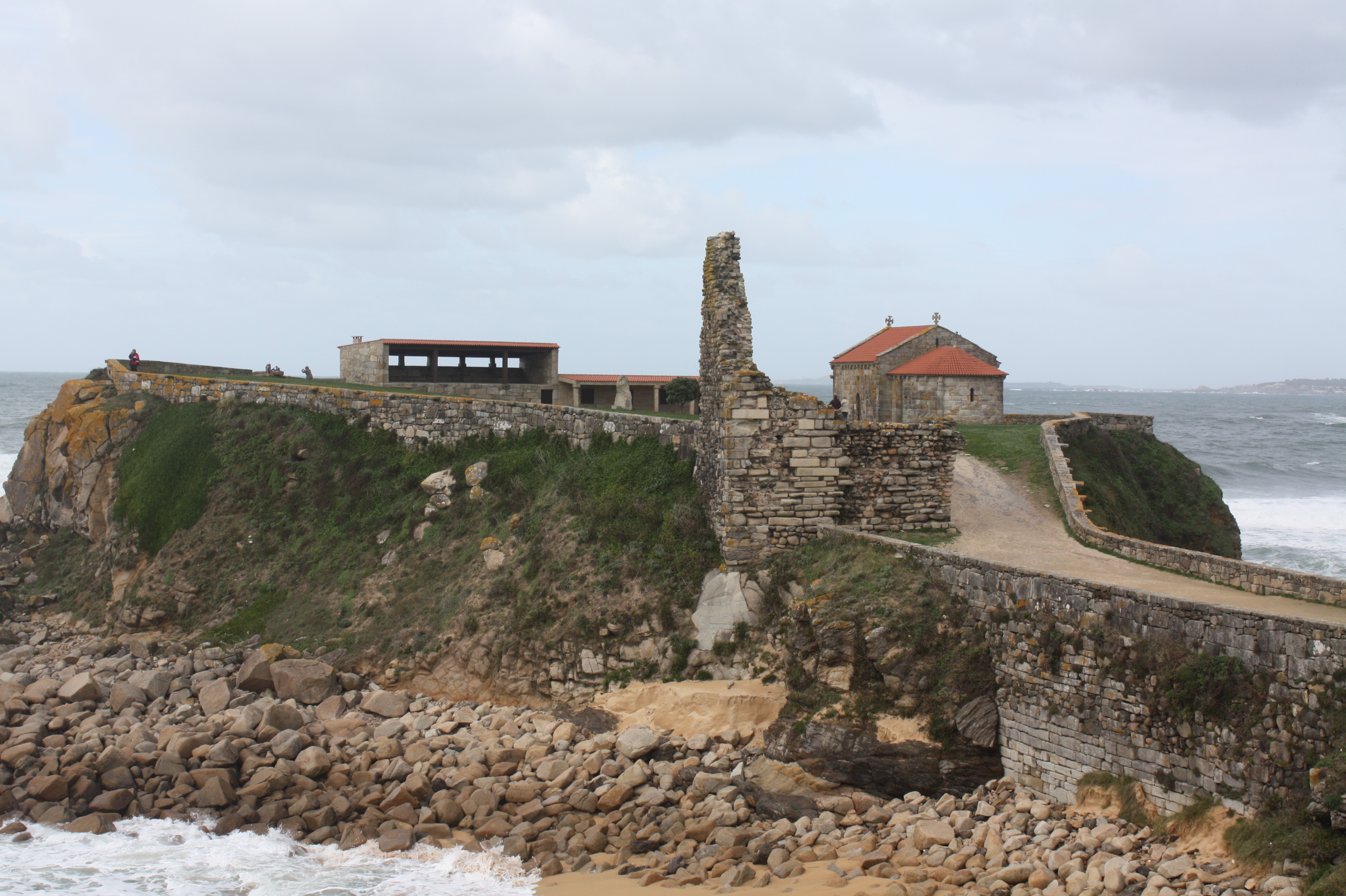
Ruins of the fortress of A Lanzada

Dated in 1024, a royal charter of King Alfonso V of León annexed the bishopric of Tui to that of Santiago, because the city had been ravaged by the gens Leodemanorum, and the local bishop and many others were captured, while others were sold or assassinated. A royal charter from Oviedo and dated to 1028 (possibly forged) recounts how one Felix fled royal disfavour aboard Viking ships (before later returning and receiving an estate from the queen). A royal charter of King Veremud III of León, dated in 1032, narrates a battle of the forces of Count Rodrigo Romaniz, including Norsemen allies, against a troop of Basque marauders who had occupied a stronghold in Mt. Lapio near Lugo. In 1068 Bishop Cresconius of Iria fortified Santiago, after in 1055 specifying that people could be exempt from resting on a Sunday in the event of an attack by Saracens or Vikings, indicating that he at least considered Vikings to be a threat. He also rebuilt a number of strongholds and castles protecting the seaways into Compostela, including the Torres de Oeste and the fortress of A Lanzada.

As the Viking Age drew to a close, Scandinavians and Normans continued to have opportunities to visit and raid Iberia while on their way to the Holy Land for pilgrimage or crusade, or in connection with Norman conquests in the Mediterranean. Key examples in the saga literature are King Sigurðr Jórsalafari and Røgnvaldr kali Kolsson.

== Madeira ==
Tenth- or eleventh-century fragments of mouse bone found in Madeira, along with mitocondrial DNA of Madeiran mice, suggests that Vikings also came to Madeira (bringing mice with them), prior to colonisation by Portugal.

== Defense fortifications ==
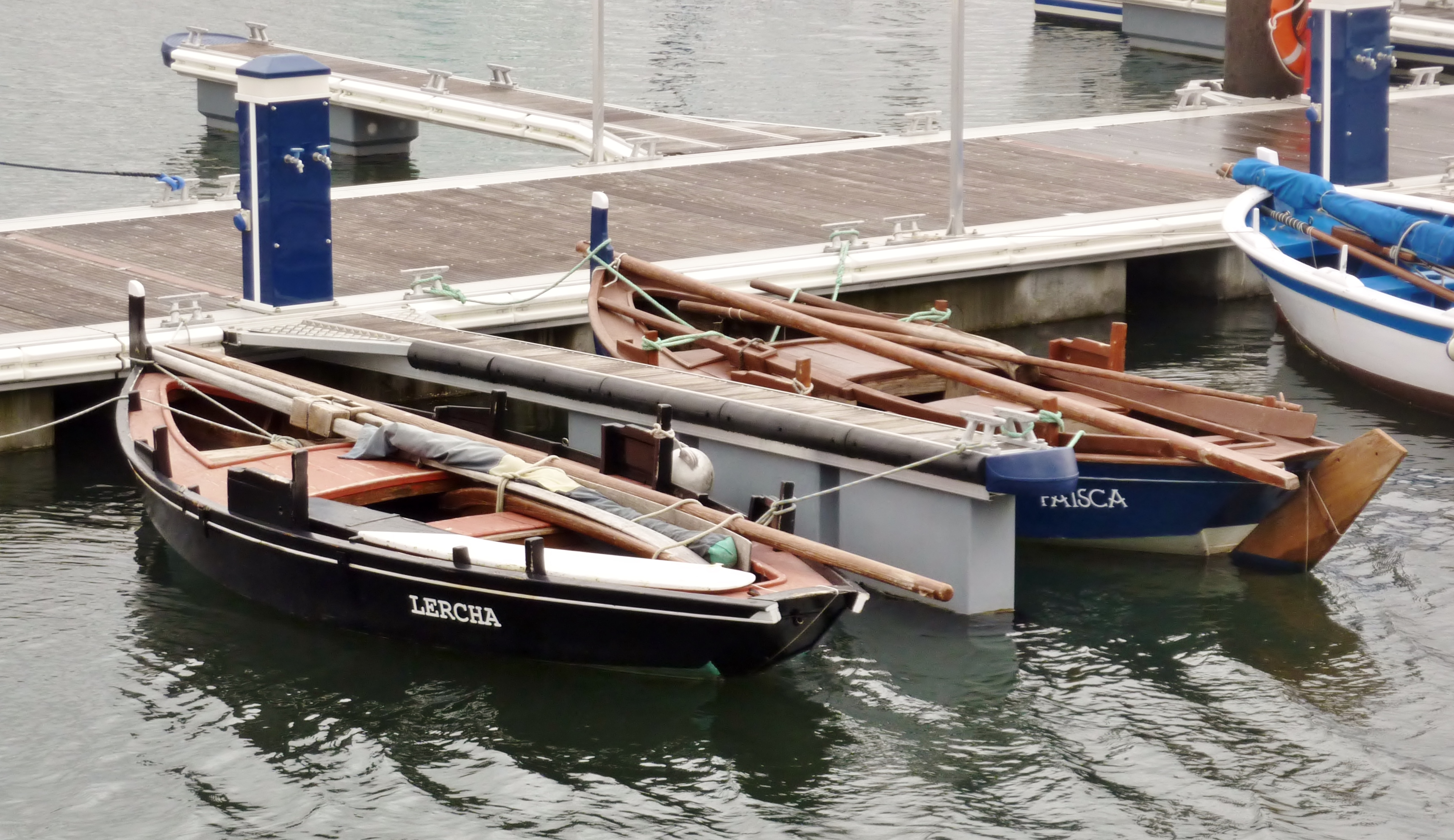
Dornas from Galicia: clinker-built boats to which is popularly attributed a Viking origin

Various historians have suggested that the well evidenced development of naval forces and fortifications across the Iberian peninsula during the 10th and 11th centuries can be partly attributed to Viking activity. For example, it has been suggested that the first navy of the Emirate of Córdoba was built in response to the raid of 844, and according to Fletcher "Alfonso III was sufficiently worried by the threat of Viking attack to establish fortified strong points near his coastline, as other rulers were doing elsewhere". It is clear, however, that a wide range of factors were encouraging these developments, and that key stages do not correlate with known Viking activity.

== See also ==
- Viking campaign in northern Portugal
