= Dorna =

Dorna may refer to:

== Places ==
=== Austria ===
- Dorna, Austria, a village in the town of Irnfritz-Messern, Horn District in Lower Austria

=== Germany ===
- Dorna (Kemberg), a village, part of the town Kemberg in Wittenberg district in Saxony-Anhalt

=== Romania ===
- Dorna, a village in Așchileu Commune, Cluj County
- Dorna-Arini, Suceava County
- Dorna Candrenilor, Suceava County
- Vatra Dornei, Suceava County
- Dorna (river), tributary of the Bistrița in Suceava County

== Other ==
- Dorna (boat), a design of fishing boat in Galicia in northwestern Spain
- Dorna (fire control system), a naval fire control system by Navantia
- Dorna (water), a Romanian mineral water bought in 2002 by The Coca-Cola Company
- Dorna Sports, the commercial rights holders for MotoGP
- Hava Faza Dorna, an Iranian aircraft manufacturer
- HESA Dorna, a jet-powered Iranian training aircraft
- Dorna (sculpture), a sculpture by Xaime Quesada

== See also ==
- Dornești, a commune located in Suceava County, Romania
- Dornişoara, a village in Suceava County, Romania
