= Viking campaign in northern Portugal =

1015–1016 military campaign

- Part of the Viking raids in Iberia
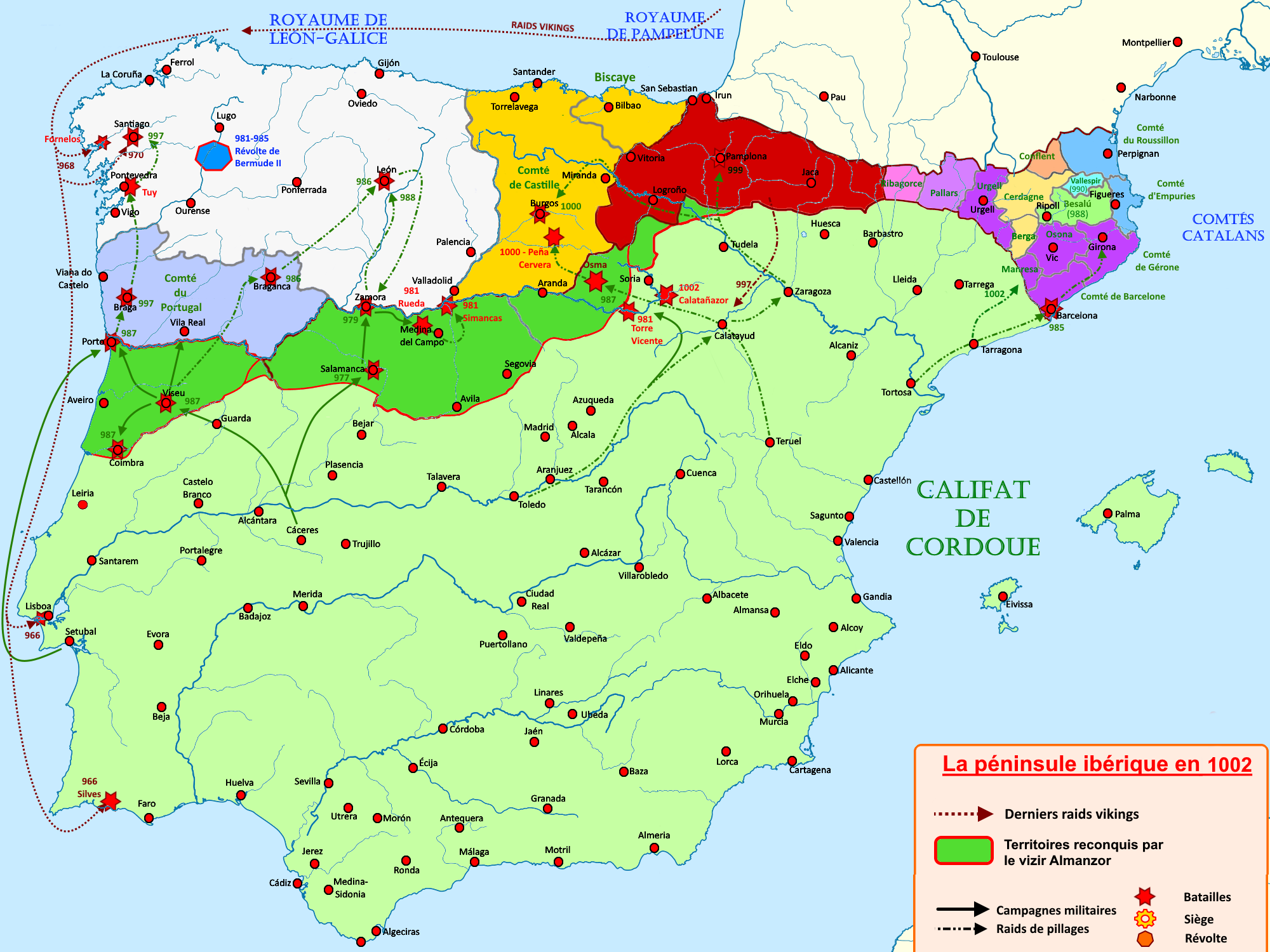
- Map of the Iberian Peninsula in 1002, including the County of Portugal and Viking raids
Date	c. 1015–1016
Location	North Region, County of Portugal
Result	Eventual Viking departure

Belligerents
Vikings; Normans	County of Portugal

Commanders and leaders
Olaf Haraldsson (allegedly)	Alvito Nunes (PKIA)

The Viking campaign in northern Portugal was a series Norse raids that took place around 1015–1016. During this period, Viking raiders sailed up the Douro River and moved north, setting up camps and attacking villages between the Douro and Ave rivers.

== Background ==
The first documented Viking raid on the western coast of Iberia occurred in 844, and although repelled, possibly with the help of a storm attributed to the miraculous intervention of Bishop Gonçalo, it left the city of Seville in ruins. Later Norse raids were recorded by Muslim, Asturian, and Galician sources, as well as some from the County of Portugal.

According to Ann Christys, Lisbon may have been the "first objective of the Vikings", although there are also records of attacks further south, along the Alentejo coast and Algarve. The Gharb al-Andalus, especially the area surrounding Lisbon, and Galicia, are the regions most frequently mentioned in reports of Norse incursions into the western Iberian Peninsula. However, the Vikings did not limit themselves to these areas, they also showed clear interest in the central Atlantic coast, particularly in the region of Entre Douro e Minho.

== Campaign ==
According to documents preserved at monasteries such as São Salvador de Moreira, a large group of Norse raiders entered the Douro River in July 1015, advancing northward and occupying the territory between the Douro and Ave rivers for approximately nine months. These men, described as "sons and grandsons of the Normans", built encampments, pillaged settlements, and took numerous captives, demanding high ransoms for their release.

One such case is recorded in a 1018 document, in which a man named Amarelo Mestaliz, living in Guilhabreu, Vila do Conde, recounts how his three daughters were captured during the Viking campaign. Unable to afford their ransom, he attempted to sell property to a noblewoman named Loba Alvites (possibly the daughter of Count Alvito Nunes), who lived at a safe enough distance from the Norman attacks. When the arrangement fell through, he sold his land to Froila Tructesindiz, raising the funds needed to free his daughters, the price being 15 silver solidi.

== Siege of Vermoim ==
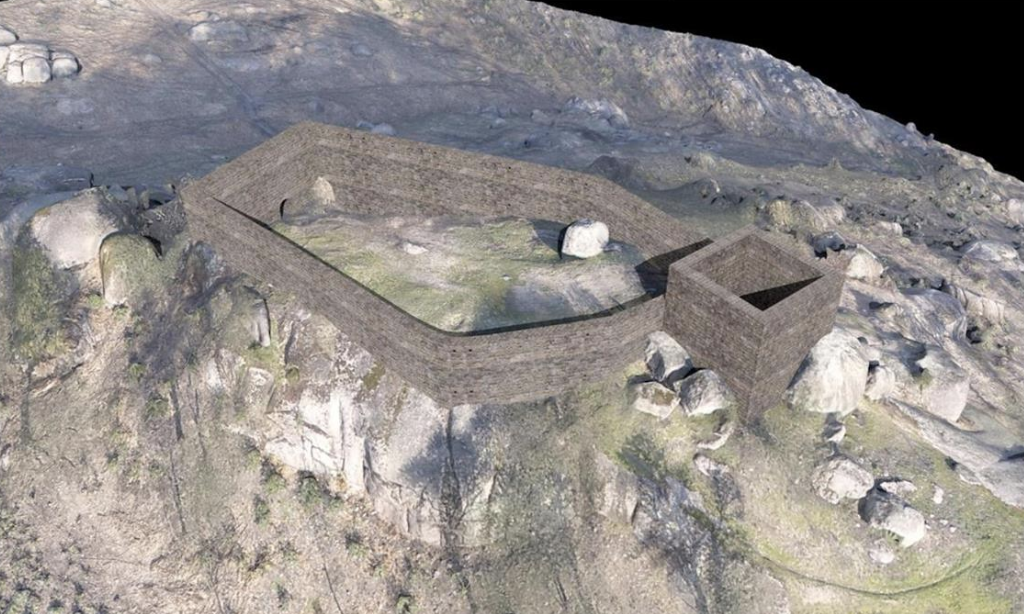
Digital reconstruction of the probable appearance of Vermoim Castle

Some sources state that, on 6 September 1016, Norse raiders navigated up the Ave River in their ships and launched an attack on the castle of Vermoim, located in the area of modern Vila Nova de Famalicão. There, they were confronted by Count of Portugal Alvito Nunes.

Although the Chronica Gothorum only offers a brief mention of the event, several historians, including José Mattoso and Mário Jorge Barroca, believe this confrontation resulted in the death of Alvito Nunes. His son, Nuno Alvites, subsequently appears as Count in the historical record.

It is not known whether the Vikings reached Vermoim entirely by river or partially overland, nor whether they attacked other sites before or after the battle. There is no definitive indication that Braga, approximately 20 km away, was targeted.

Some historians suggest that the Vikings were commanded by Olaf Haraldsson, the future king of Norway, who allegedly captured the castle and took part of the local population as prisoners.

=== Debates on the date ===
Historian Rui Pinto de Azevedo dates the battle to September 1015 rather than September 1016, thereby placing it within the nine-month period of Viking activity. Hélio Pires raises two possibilities over this claim: either the Norsemen continued their raids beyond April 1016 and attacked the castle of Vermoim in September on their way north, or the reference in the Chronica Gothorum belongs to a different Viking fleet.

Avezedo's claim is supported by A. Lúcio Vidal, who argues that it would have been impossible for Olaf to attack the castle in September 1016 and return to Norway within just four months, given that he ascended to the throne before the end of that same year (though the exact month is unknown). Vidal suggests that Olaf concluded his campaign by April 1016, making it more likely that the attack on Vermoim occurred a year earlier.

An even earlier date, 1014, has been suggested by the historian Dozy. However, Azevedo dismisses this claim, stating:

As for the year 1014, accepted by Dozy for this expedition, we only consider it credible when it comes to the region of the city of Tui, that at this juncture suffered total ruin again. I confess, however, insufficiently documented to issue a safe opinion about the Norman invasion of this territory.

== Aftermath ==
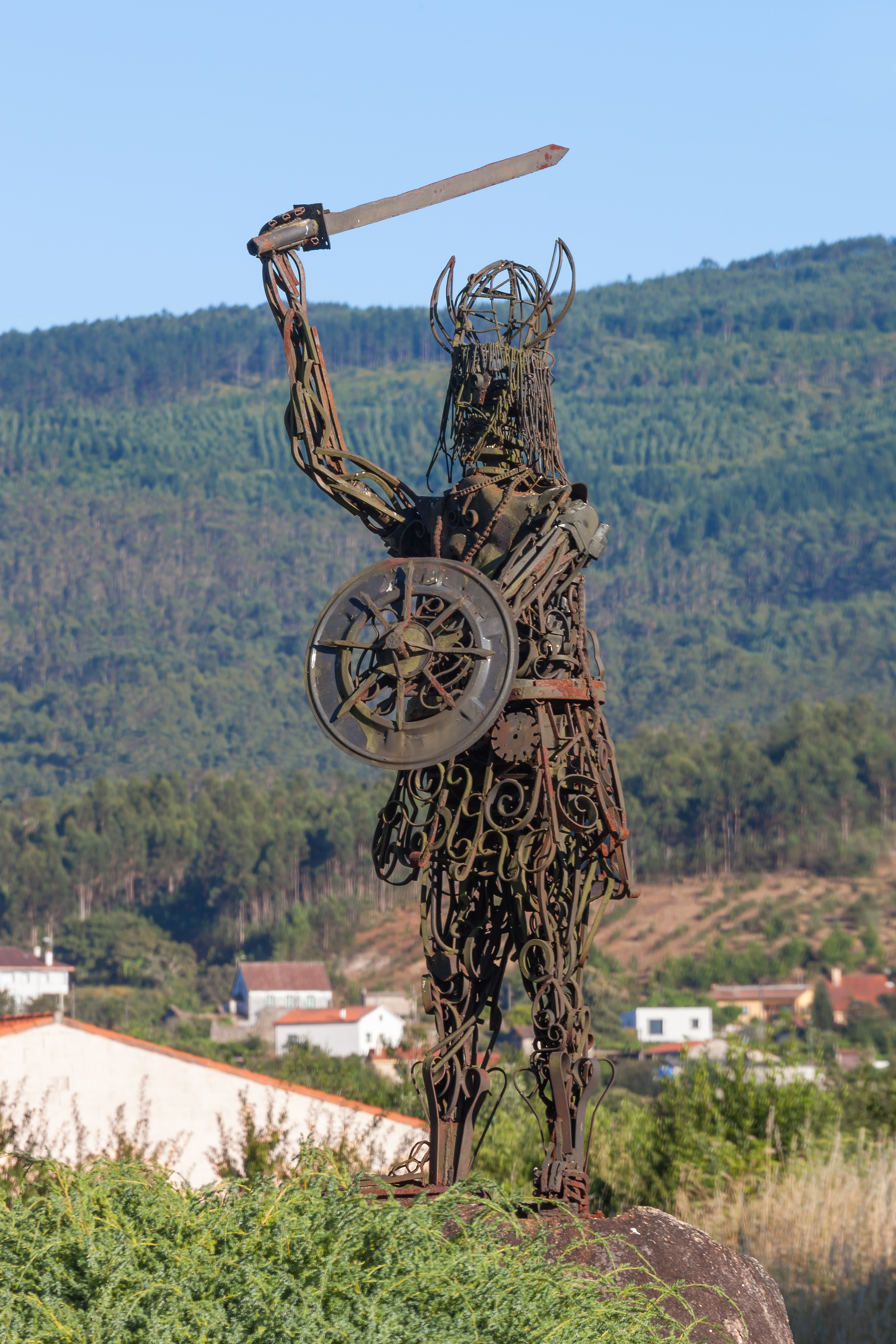
Statue in memory of the Viking incursions, Catoira, Galicia

Despite the written records about these incursions, no archaeological traces of the Viking encampments in Portugal have been found.

Another charter, dated 1026, from the Monastery of Pedroso, Gaia, mentions a mother named Meitilli, who transferred land to a man named Octicio in Terra da Santa Maria (modern-day Ovar) as repayment for rescuing her and her daughter Guncina from Norman captivity. The ransom included a wolf skin cloak, a sword, shirt, 3 scarves, a cow, and salt, valued at 60–70 maios (or módios).

More recently, the University of Porto, in collaboration with CITCEM and other institutions, has promoted new research into this period. The castle of Vermoim, attacked and later dismantled in the 13th century, is now part of an archaeological zone being considered for designation as a national monument.

== See also ==
- Viking expansion
- History of Portugal (711–1139)
- County of Portugal
- Vikings in Iberia

== Bibliography ==
- Pires, Hélio Fernando Vitorino (March 2012). Incursões Nórdicas no Ocidente Ibérico (844-1147): fontes, história e vestígios (in Portuguese).
- de Azevedo, Rui Pinto (1974). "A expedição de Almançor a Santiago de Compostela em 997, e a de piratas normandos à Galiza em 1015-16" (PDF). Revista Portuguesa de História (in Portuguese). University of Coimbra: 73–93.
- Vidal, A. Lúcio (1983). "Olaf Haraldson em Portucale: (Notas a dois artigos sobre as sagas nórdicas e a Hispania)". Grial (in Portuguese). 21 (79): 43–52. JSTOR 29750156.
- Barroca, Mário Jorge; da Silva, Armando Coelho Ferreira (December 2018). Barroca, Mário Jorge; Silva, Armando Coelho Ferreira da (eds.). "As incursões Vikings no Norte de Portugal". Mil Anos da Incursão Normanda ao Castelo de Vermoim (in Portuguese). Porto: CITCEM. doi:10.21747/9789898351975/mil. hdl:10362/113163. ISBN 978-989-8351-97-5.
