= Viking Festival of Catoira =

Annual event in Catoira, Spain

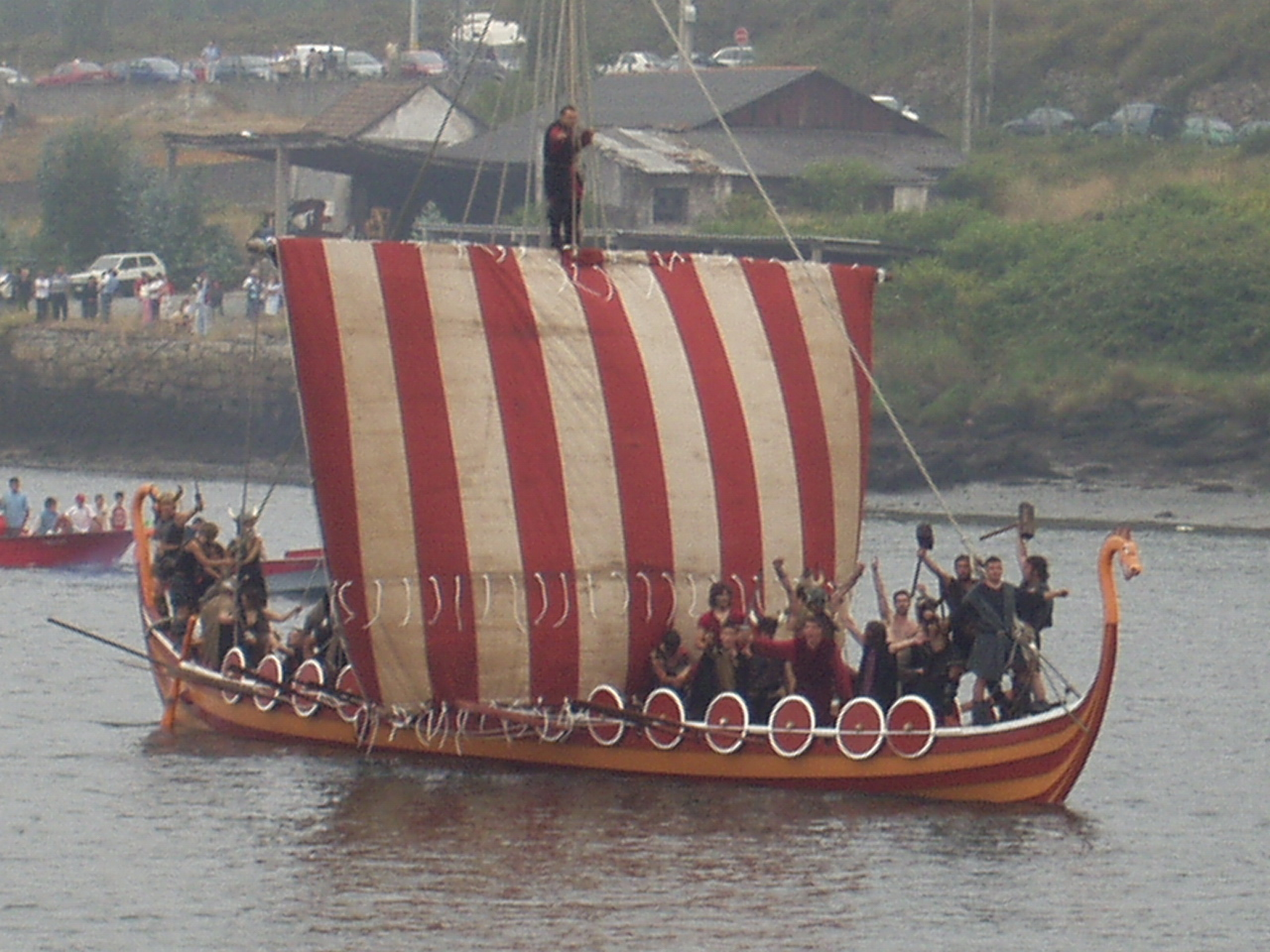
- Date: First Sunday of August
- Frequency: Annual
- Venue: Torres de Oeste
- Locations: Catoira (Pontevedra), Spain
- Inaugurated: 1961

Fiesta of International Tourist Interest
- Designated: 2002

Viking Festival of Catoira (Galician: Romaría viquinga de Catoira) is a secular festival which has been celebrated in Catoira, Spain, every first Sunday in August since 1961, in the surroundings of Castellum Honesti, currently known as Torres de Oeste (Oeste Towers, nowadays understood as West Towers) fortress. It is held to commemorate Catoira's role in defending Galicia against the Vikings, who attempted to plunder the treasure held in the Cathedral of Santiago de Compostela, and also to reenact the Viking invasions that took place there a thousand years ago.

== History ==
Viking Festival of Catoira has been celebrated since 1961. The first stage was the Ateneo de Ullán forum between 1961 and 1964. In 1959, the poet and priest Faustino Rey Romero from Isorna along with the poet Baldomero Isorna Casal from Catoira, founded the Ateneo de Ullán, an artistic and literary forum made up of intellectuals from the local area. This group of intellectuals decided at one of their gatherings in 1960 that it would be a good idea to celebrate the landing of King Olaf by means of a festival. The first Viking Festival took place on 29 July 1961 with a mass in Santiago's Castellum Honesti fortress chapel, in memory of Diego Xelmírez and the others who defended the fortress.

In addition, Pedro Montañés, crowned with tree branches, played the role of the fearsome Viking Ulfo and jumped from his dorna boat to the land in order to meet with the Bishop Cresconio, represented by Priest Romero who, with mere words, dominated the invader, making him kneel submissively before the representative of Christianity. Afterwards, a picnic lunch took place to the sound of bagpipes, as well as a reading in which writers of the region participated. The current proclamation of the festivities is inspired on these events. At night, cacharelas (a type of bonfire) are lit in the merlons of the towers in order to remember the way they warned of the Vikings arrival in the estuary.

The second stage which began in 1965 and lasted until 1990, was the consolidation period for the festival, sponsored by Cerámica Domínguez del Noroeste S.A (a local ceramics and flooring company) and organised by their workers. In 1988 the festivities were declared to be of National Tourist Interest.

The third and final stage began in 1991 when the council of Catoira took charge of the festival. This period of international projection started by twinning Catoira with the Danish village of Frederikssund. In 2002 the festival was declared to be of International Tourist Interest.

== Overview ==
During the celebration, the residents of Catoira dress up as people from the period to act out the battles. The festival starts at 10 in the morning with traditional Galician music played through the streets of the town. The festival itself takes place around the remains of the towers next to the river Ulla. The climax of the event is the disembarkation: the locals who portray the warriors arrive in a replica of an 11th-century Viking ship to take the towers. The rest of the participants act as villagers, who try to fight against the invaders. The festivities continue with a traditional lunch (sardines, mussels, empanada) with bagpipes as background music. The party ends with a verbena, a traditional Galician dance.
