= Cresconius (bishop of Iria) =

Roman Catholic bishop

Cresconius (Spanish: Cresconio) (c. 1036 – 1066) was an 11th-century bishop of Iria Flavia and Santiago de Compostela in Spain who succeeded Vistruarius.

Cresconius was a supporter of King Ferdinand I of Castile and educated Ferdinand's son, García II of Galicia and Portugal, who would later be crowned by Cresconius himself as king of the newly reestablished Kingdom of Galicia.

Like his contemporary Odo of Bayeux, Cresconius was a "warrior bishop" and during a Viking invasion of Galicia, he gathered an army and defeated the invaders. He fortified Castellum Honesti ‒ a castle known today as Torres do Oeste which once stood in Catoira, Spain ‒ with the goal of blocking future invasions via the estuary, Ría de Arousa, and also built the city walls of Santiago de Compostela.

== Cresconius and the Primacy of Santiago ==
Cresconius believed that because Santiago was the burial place of Saint James the Greater, his see naturally occupied a superior place amongst the dioceses of the West as an "apostolic see." To this end, he proclaimed himself Episcopus Iriensis et Apostolicae Sedis. However, this assumption was not supported by Rome and Pope Leo IX excommunicated him at the Council of Rheims (1049). Nevertheless, Cresconius continued using this title, and the bishops of Lugo, Dumio, Oviedo, and Porto acknowledged his authority and primacy.

In 1056, he presided over the Council of Compostela where he prohibited the use of weapons by clerics, and also forbade that clerics be married. He opened parochial schools and fought pagan superstitions in existence even before the Roman conquest of Galicia.
