= Dorna (sculpture) =

Sculpture in Pontevedra, Spain

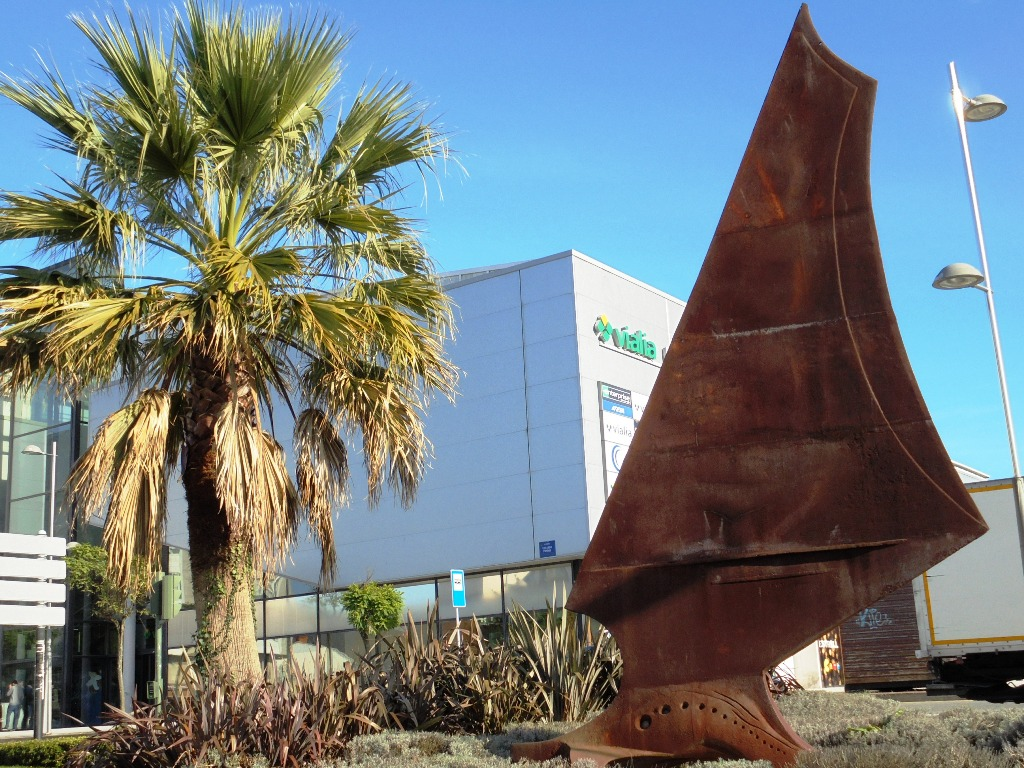
- The sculpture in 2014
- Artist: Xaime Quesada
- Completion date: 21 August 2001; 24 years ago
- Medium: Cast iron
- Subject: Dorna
- Condition: Good
- Location: Pontevedra, Spain; 42°25′19″N 8°38′12″W

Dorna is a sculpture created by the Spanish artist Xaime Quesada, located in Pontevedra (Spain). It is also known as Tribute to the pilgrimage way to Santiago de Compostela and is currently in Gorgullón Street on the Portuguese Way opposite the Vialia shopping centre.

== History ==
In 2001, the redevelopment of Uruguay Avenue and the southern bank of the Lérez River, which the Spanish Ministry of Public Works had undertaken in the city, was completed.

As a highlight of the project, a large roundabout was created on Uruguay Avenue at the entrance to the Burgo Bridge and it was decided to install a monument commemorating the passage of the Portuguese pilgrimage way to Santiago de Compostela through this strategic point of the city.

The sculpture was commissioned to the Ourense artist Xaime Quesada and was inaugurated on 20 August 2001.

The section of Uruguay Avenue where the Burgo roundabout was located was redesigned a few years after the sculpture was installed, in October 2006. The roundabout was removed and some of the elements of the sculpture were lost, including the pond and the lighting, as the sculpture was designed to rest on a body of water.

== Description ==
The sculpture was designed to represent Galicia as a land of water, light and wind. It is a tribute to the Way of St. James, conceived in the form of the ancient Galician dornas, the sail unfurled in the wind.

It is a cast iron dorna, a typical fishing boat from the Rías Bajas, with its bow pointing towards Santiago de Compostela, the destination of the pilgrimage route, with the sail powered by the wind to create dynamism.

The dorna emphasises the maritime character of Pontevedra and its relationship with the sea, and symbolises the pilgrim who makes the journey to Santiago de Compostela.

The roundabout for which the work was designed had a pond surrounding the sculpture of water and was illuminated by a tinted water effect. The author used cast iron as a material, associating it with the idea that its self rusting makes it eternal like the pilgrimage way.

== Gallery ==
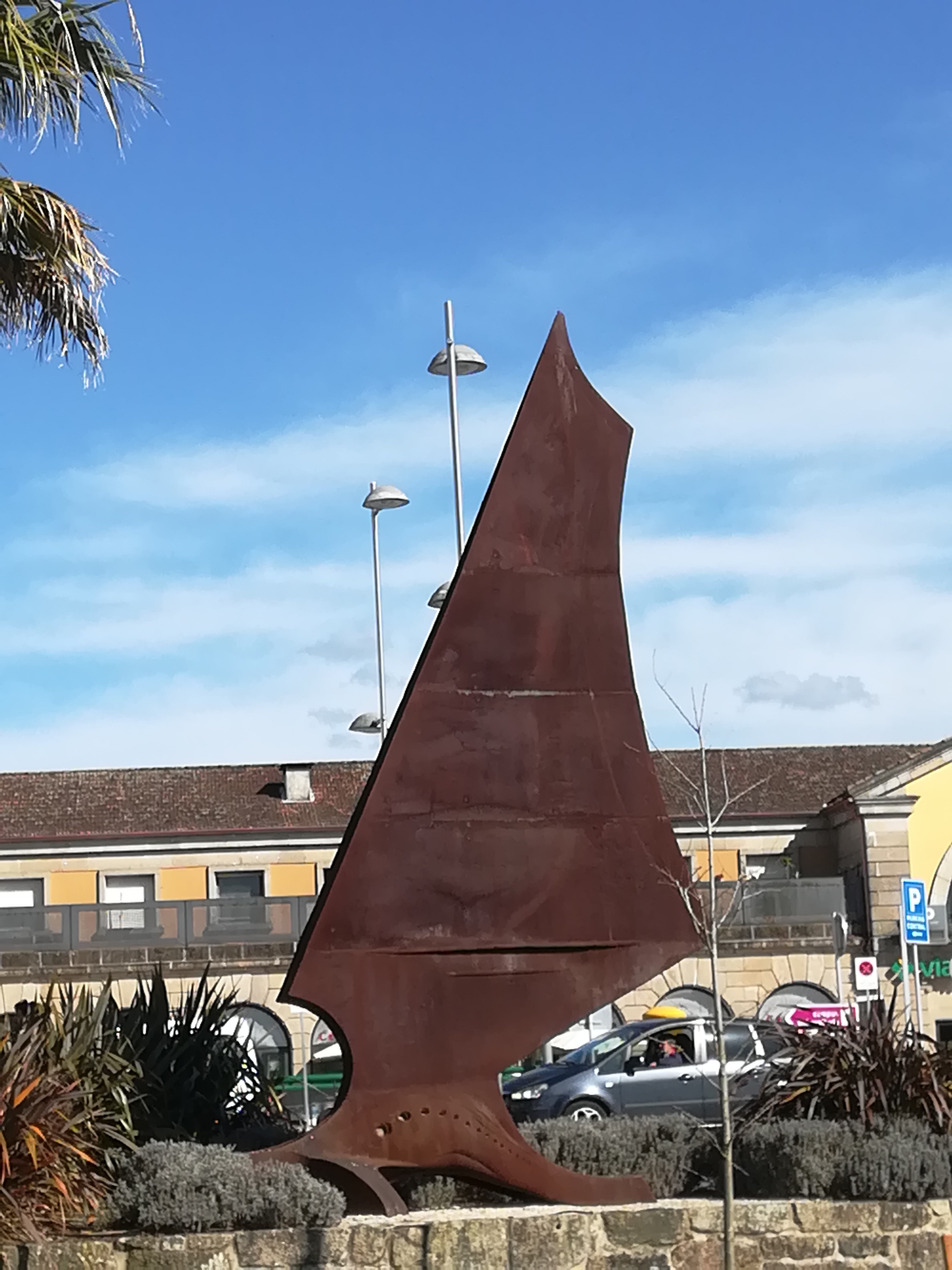

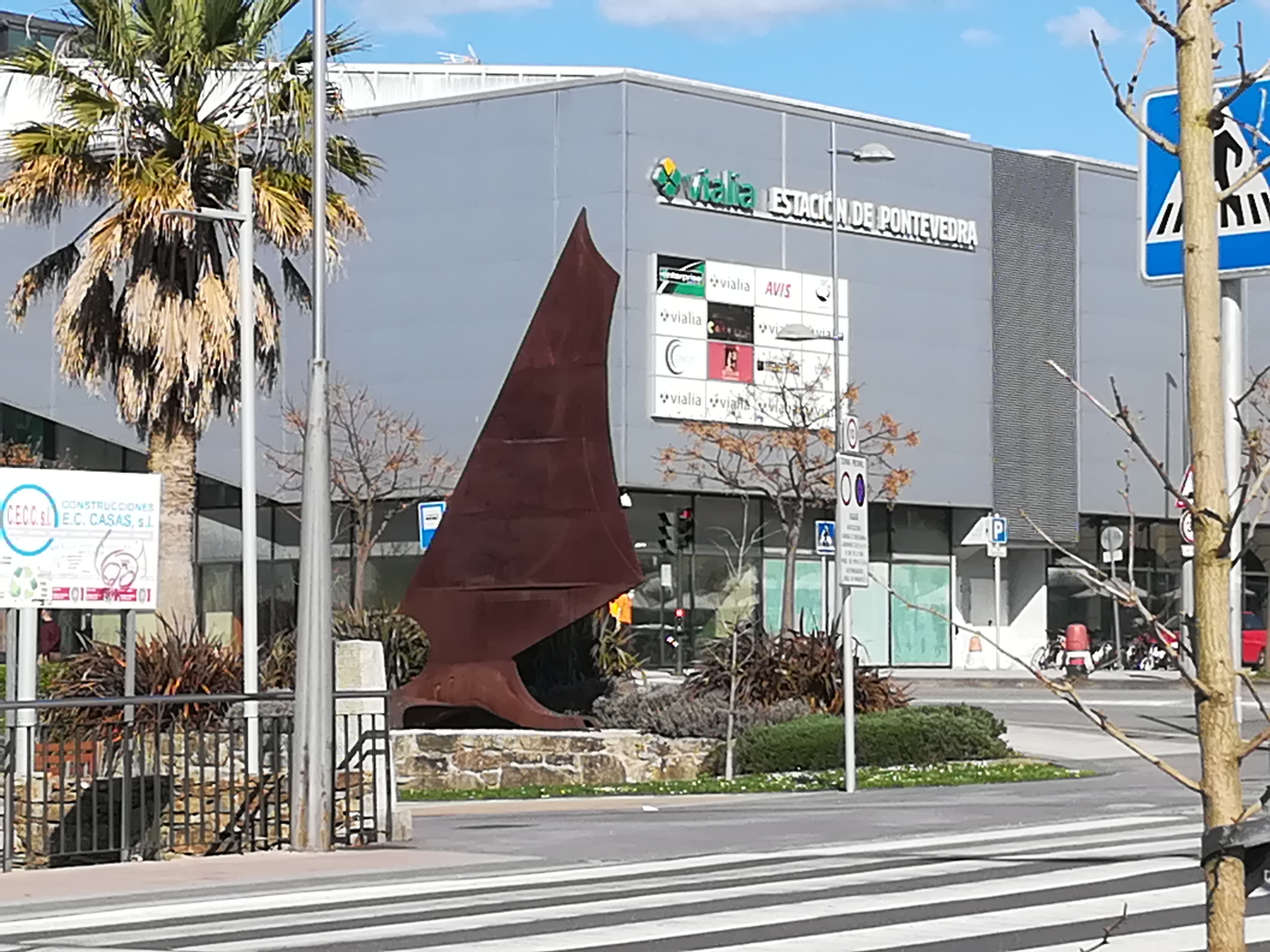

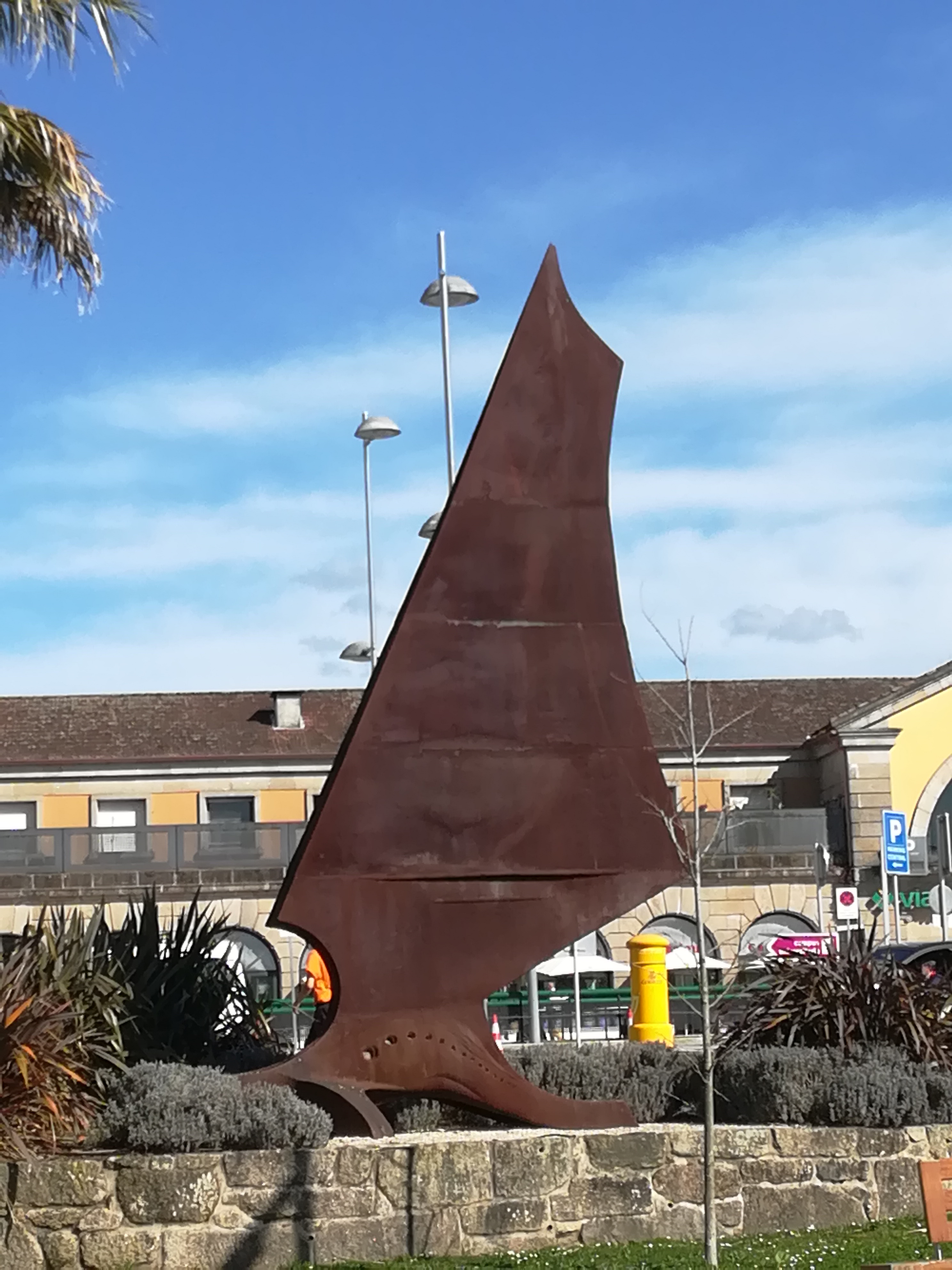

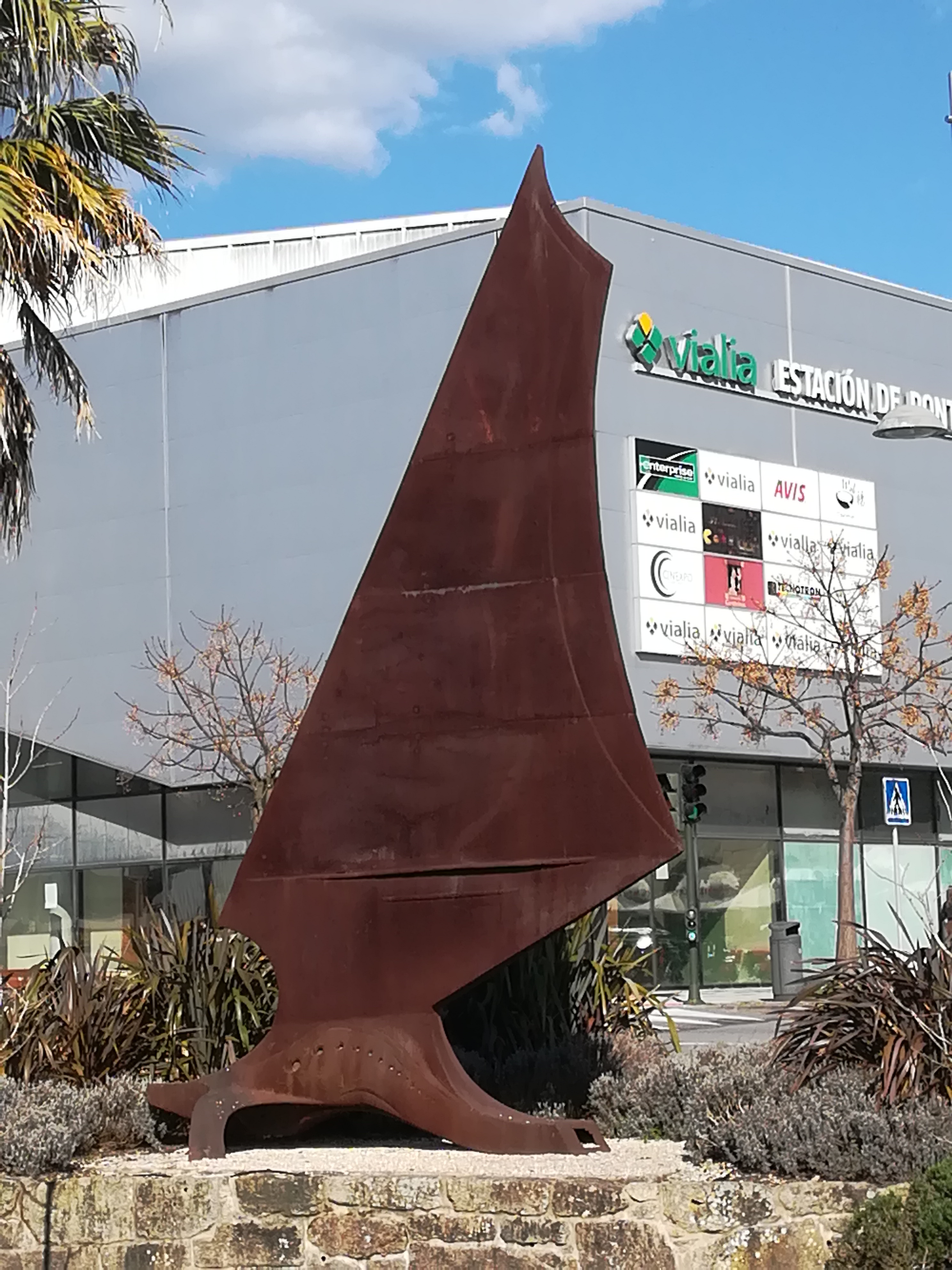

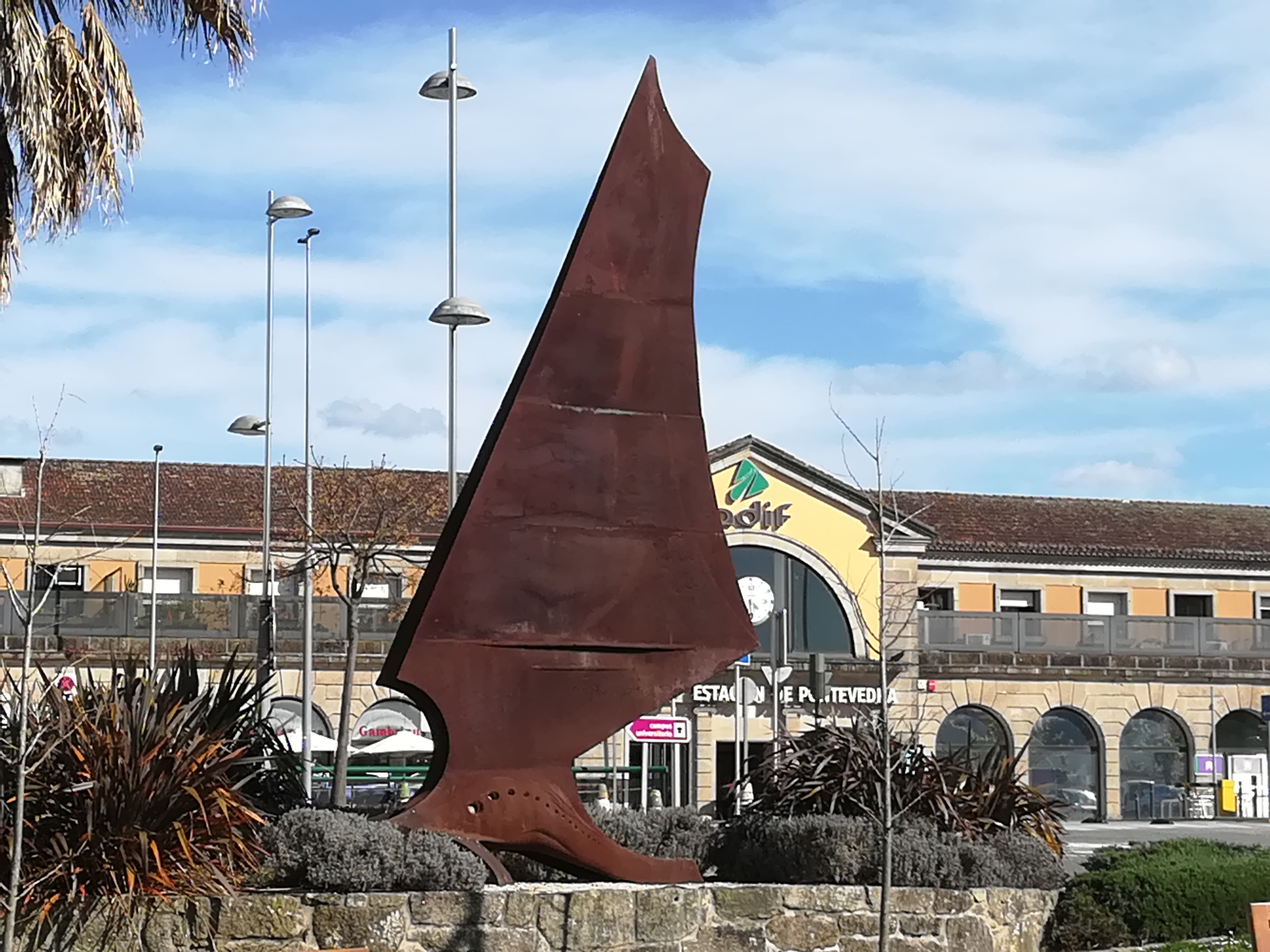

== See also ==
- The Portuguese Way
- Teucer statue
- Tertulia Monument (Literary Circle in Modern Coffee)
- The Fiel contraste
- Valle-Inclán statue
