= Catoira =

- municipality
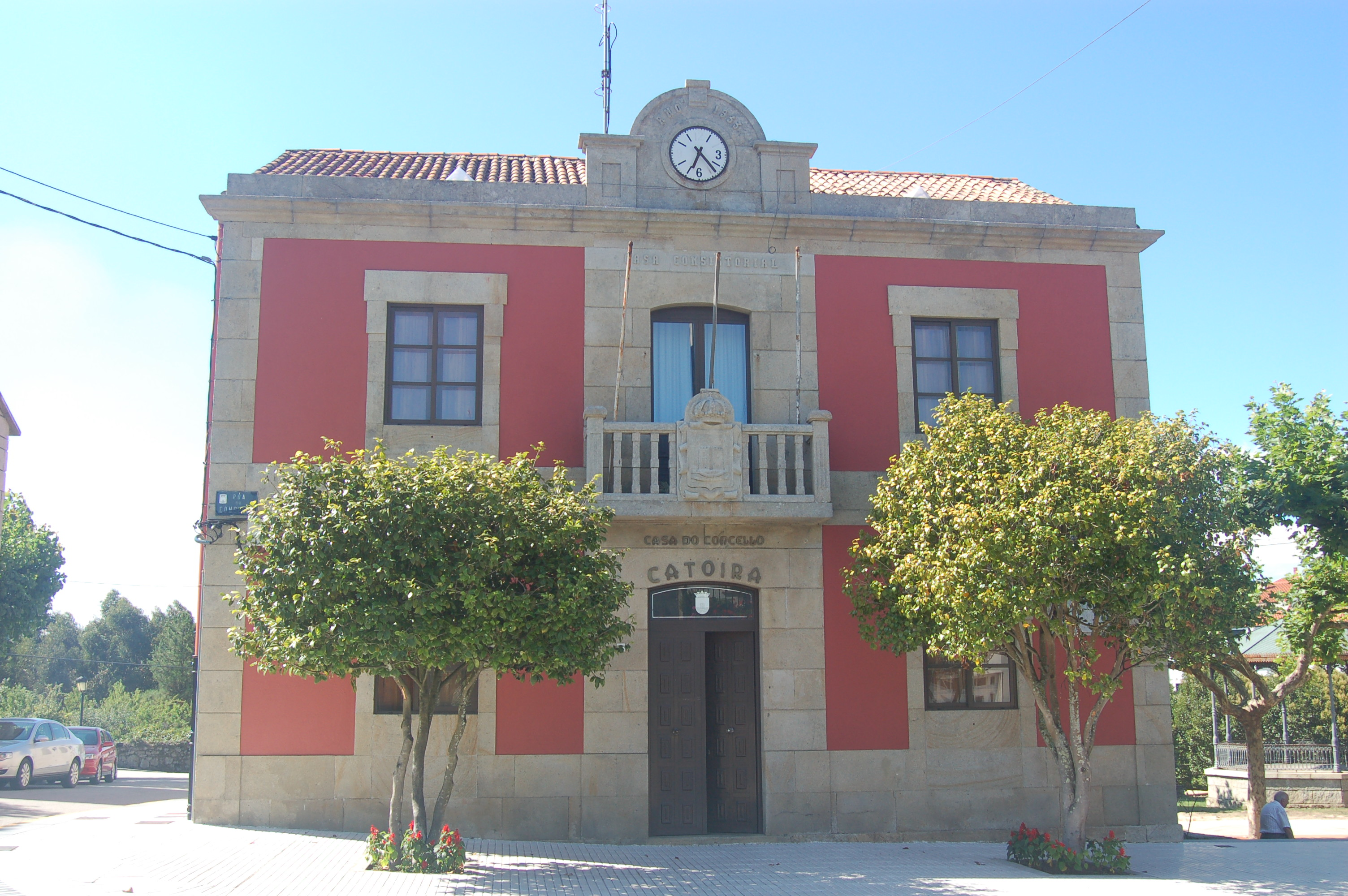
- Old town hall

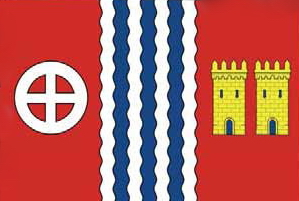
- Flag Coat of arms

- Location in Spain
- Coordinates: 42°40′0″N 8°43′18″W
- Country: Spain
- Autonomous community: Galicia
- Province: Pontevedra
- Comarca: Caldas

Government
  - Mayor: Xoán Castaño Conde (BNG)

Area
  - Total: 29.1 km^{2} (11.2 sq mi)

Population (2025-01-01)
  - Total: 3,274
  - Density: 113/km^{2} (291/sq mi)
- Demonym: Catoirenses
- Time zone: UTC+1 (CET)
  - Summer (DST): UTC+2 (CET)
- Website: www.catoira.es

Catoira is a municipality in Galicia, Spain, located in the province of Pontevedra. It's known for the ruins of the Torres do Oeste (Towers of the West), a fortification built in the Early Middle Ages as a defense against Viking attacks.

== Demography ==
Historical population

Year	Pop.	±% p.a.
1877	2,059	—
1887	1,767	−1.52%
1900	1,918	+0.63%
1910	2,211	+1.43%
1920	2,321	+0.49%
1930	2,646	+1.32%
1940	2,846	+0.73%

Year	Pop.	±% p.a.
1950	2,962	+0.40%
1960	3,244	+0.91%
1970	3,431	+0.56%
1980	3,732	+0.84%
1990	3,653	−0.21%
2000	3,451	−0.57%
2010	3,499	+0.14%

Source: From: INE Archiv

== Local festivals ==
The most important celebrations include:

- the Viking Festival of Catoira, held on the first Sunday in August (Declared of International Tourist Interest),
- the Supervisory Celebrations
- Feast day of Saint Anthony of Padua, held on the second Sunday in July, during which the famous Gastronomical Celebration "da Solla" is celebrated. The local parishes have (during the summer) their own celebrations.
- The most important of these is the Festa da parroquia de Oeste, or Festas de Santabaia, on the second weekend in August. There are also very important celebrations in honor of San Antonio de Dimo (the first Sunday in July)

== See also ==
- List of municipalities in Pontevedra
