= Torres de Oeste =

Castle ruins in Catoira, Spain

Coordinates: 42.6766°N 8.72577°W

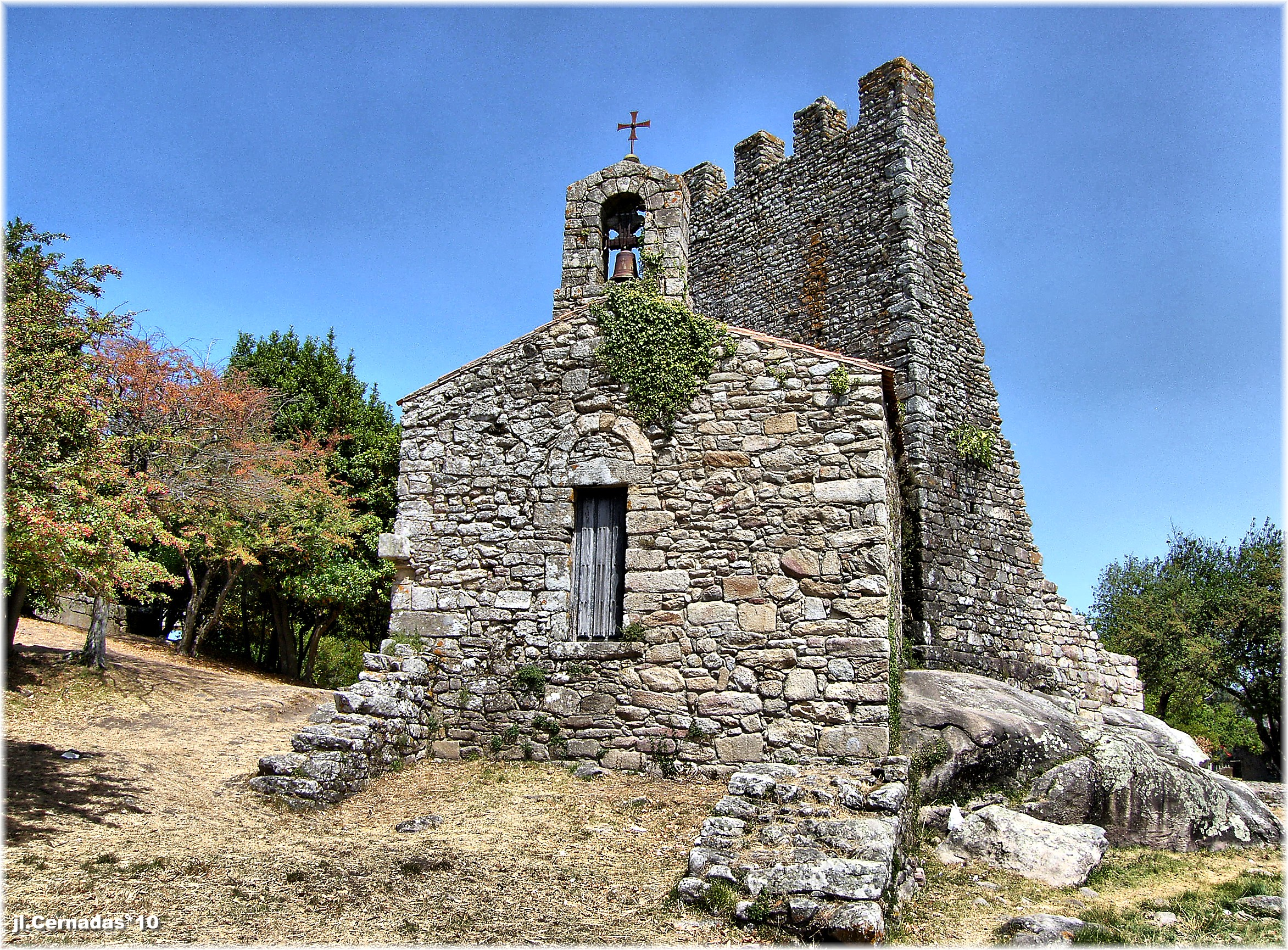
Ruins of one of the towers, with a chapel in the front.

The Oeste Towers (Galician and Spanish: Torres de Oeste) are the ruins of a medieval castle in Catoira, Galicia, Spain, located at the head of the Ría de Arousa, in the river Ulla estuary. The towers remaining today are the ruins of Castellum Honesti, and played an important role in the defense of Santiago de Compostela from Viking attacks. In 1931 they were declared a national monument.

Each summer, the first Sunday of August, a celebration recalls the repulse of a Viking invasion.

== History ==
In the 9th century, King Alfonso III of Leon built the castle as a defense against Viking attacks. The two remaining towers are from this period, and have a pre-Romanesque style. Pre-Roman ceramics and bronze tools have been discovered at the site. Two centuries later, King Alfonso V of Leon donates the fortress to the bishopric of Iria-Compostela, held at that moment by bishop Vestruarius. Subsequent bishops Cresconio, Diego Peláez and Diego Gelmirez undertook the commitment to strengthen the Castle in order to protect the holy site of Santiago de Compostela. The structure of the Castle was defined in the 12th century. At that time, the enclosure of the Castle was formed by seven towers, and it was surrounded by marshes. The Castle has a 12th-century chapel built by Gelmirez to honor the apostle Saint James. The Castellum Honesti began its decline in the 15th century.

Although the name is derived from the anthroponym Honesti, later evolved losing the middle intervocalic /n/ like any other Galician word, giving Hoesti. Convergence with the rest of the words of Galician common lexicon made it be understood as Oeste, which means "West" in Galician, and thus losing the etymological <h> towards the current orthography.

== See also ==
- Vikings in Iberia
