= Dorna (boat) =

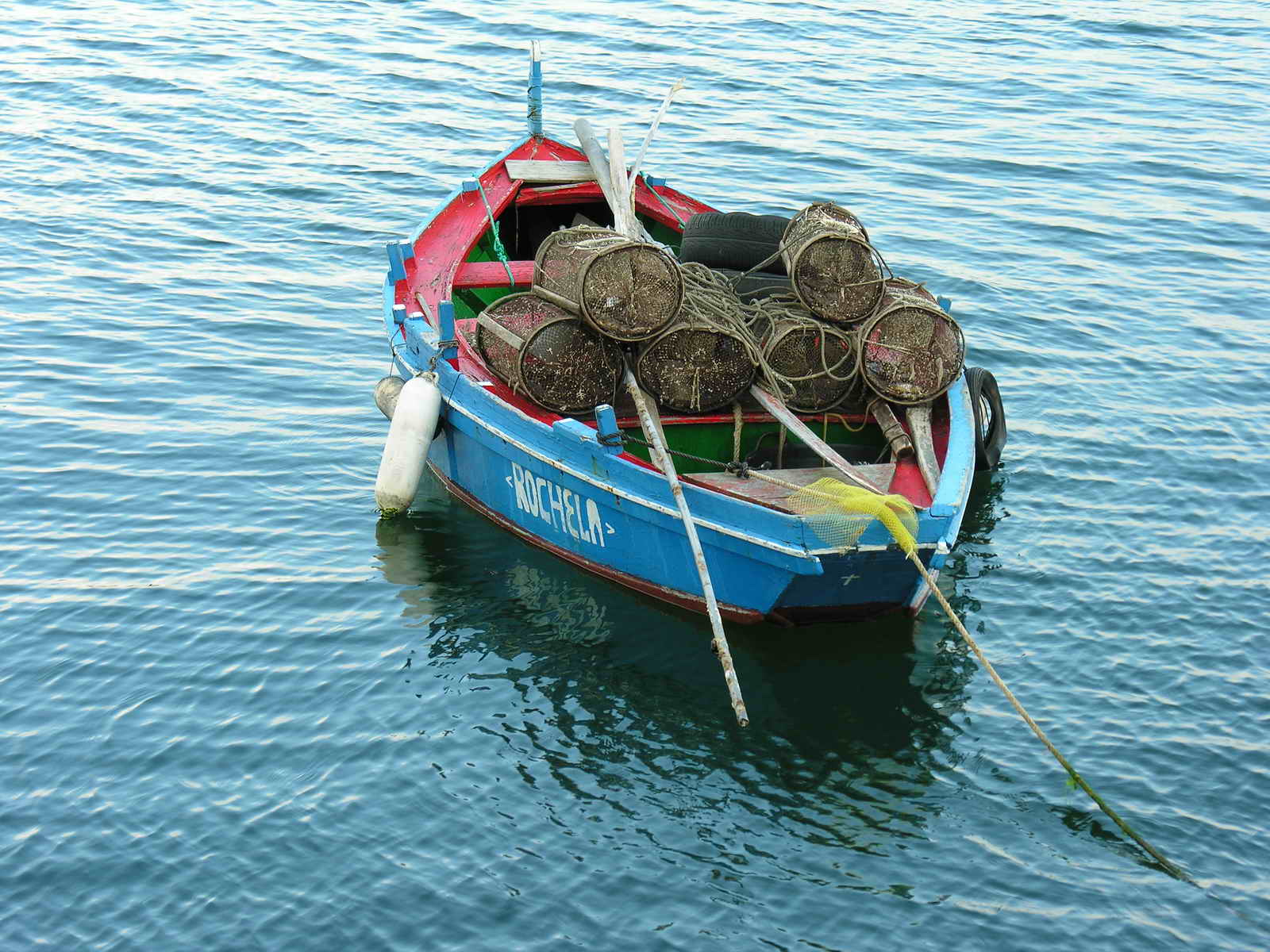
A dorna loaded with nasas (fish traps)

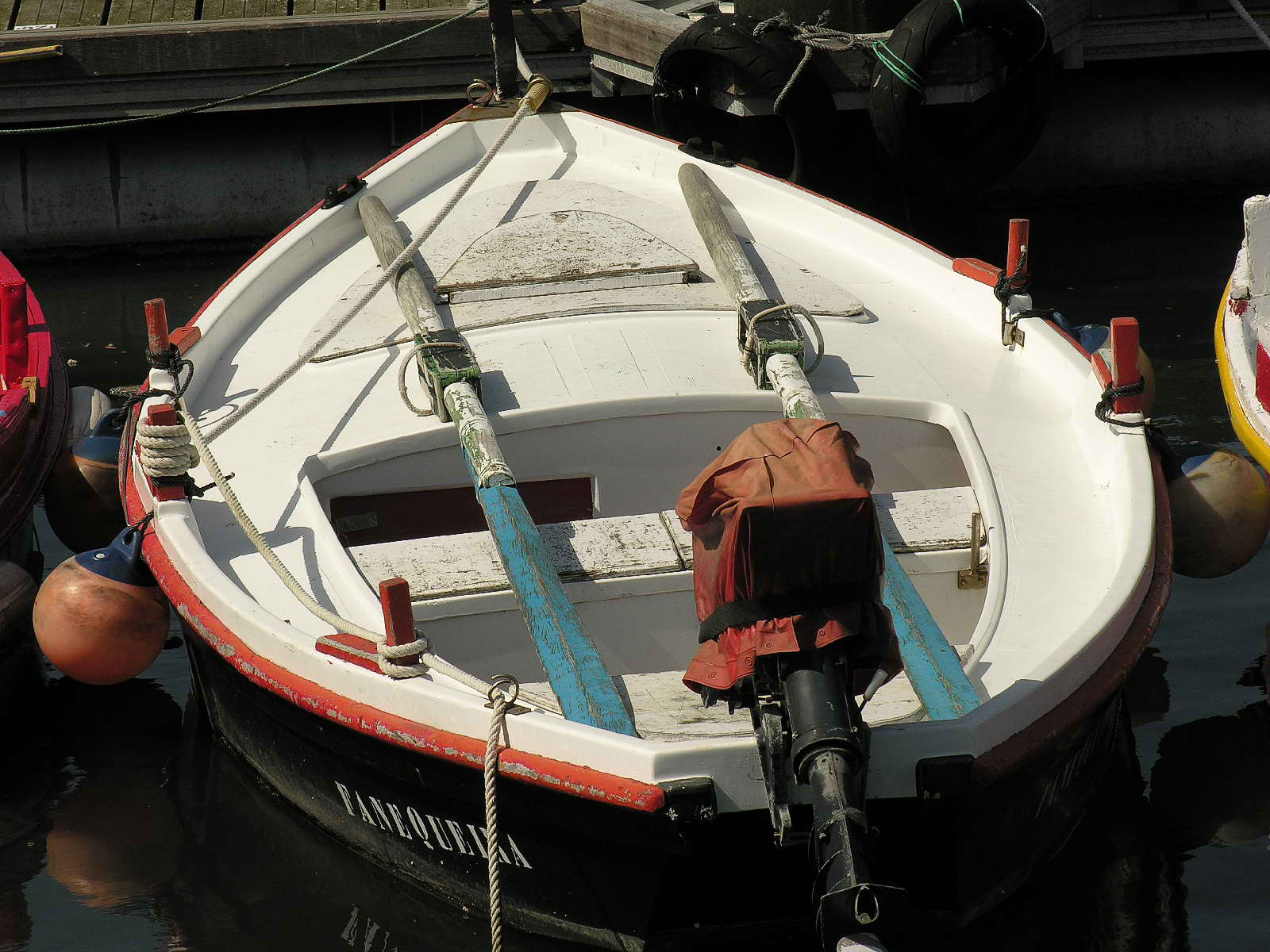
A dorna at Ribeira, Galicia

The dorna is a design of fishing boat specific to the Rías Baixas, a group of estuarine inlets in Galicia, a province on the Atlantic coast of northwestern Spain.

It is a clinker-built boat, typically around 4.5 m (15 ft) long and 1.5 m (4.9 ft) broad. It has at least a two-man crew: a skipper who handles the tiller (which extends forward from the stern under the hull), and a seaman who manages the headsail. It may, however, have a crew of three or four. It has oars for propulsion for when there is no wind. Modern boats may be fitted with an auxiliary outboard motor. Swedish scholar Staffan Mörling and Galician scholar Xaquín Lorenzo have suggested that the design may have been inspired by that of Viking 'dragon ships'.

== See also ==
- Dorna (sculpture)
