= Catalan literature =

Catalan literature (Catalan: Literatura catalana) is the name conventionally used to refer to literature written in the Catalan language. The focus of this article is not just the literature of Catalonia, but literature written in Catalan from anywhere, so that it includes writers from Andorra, the Valencian Community, Balearic Islands and other territories where any Catalan variant is spoken.

The Catalan literary tradition is extensive, starting in the early Middle Ages. A Romantic revivalist movement of the 19th century, Renaixença, classified Catalan literature in periods. The centuries-long chapter known as Decadència that followed the golden age of Valencian literature, was perceived as extremely poor and lacking literary works of quality. Further attempts to explain why this happened (see History of Catalonia) have motivated new critical studies of the period, and nowadays a revalorisation of this early modern age is taking place. Catalan literature reemerged in the 19th and early 20th centuries, to experience troubled times from the start of the Spanish Civil War on. Many intellectuals were forced into exile and Catalan culture was repressed. However, this repression began to temper after the end of World War II. Catalan was repressed until Francisco Franco's death and the end of his dictatorship in 1975. Then, a development towards officiality and presence in schools and media started to this day.

== Middle Ages ==
=== Origins ===
Catalan, a Romance language, evolved from Vulgar Latin in the Middle Ages, when it became a separate language from Latin. Literary use of the Catalan language is generally said to have started with the religious text known as Homilies d'Organyà, written either in late 11th or early 12th century, though the earlier Cançó de Santa Fe, from 1054–76, may be Catalan or Occitan. Another early Catalan poem is the mid-13th century Augats, seyós qui credets Déu lo Payre, a planctus Mariae (lament of Mary).

Ramon Llull (13th century), one of the major medieval Mallorcan writers in the Catalan language, is not only saluted for starting a Catalan literary tradition clearly separated from the Occitan-speaking world of the time, but also credited with enriching the language with his coining of a large number of words, and his philosophy. See Llibre de Meravelles (including the famed Llibre de les bèsties) and Blanquerna (including Llibre d'Amic e Amat) for more details on his works.

=== Les quatre grans cròniques ===
These four major literary works are chronicles written between the 13th and 14th centuries narrating the deeds of the monarchs and leading figures of the Crown of Aragon. They are the following:

- Crònica de Jaume I, also known as Llibre dels fets (The book of deeds)
- Crònica de Bernat Desclot, also known as "Book of the king, Peter of Aragon".
- Crònica de Ramon Muntaner
- Crònica de Pere el Cerimoniós

=== Lyric poetry ===
The first widespread vernacular writing in any Romance language was the lyric poetry of the troubadours, who composed in Occitan. Since Occitan and Catalan are often indistinguishable before the 14th century, it is not surprising that many Catalans composed in the Occitan poetic koiné. The first Catalan troubadour (trobadors) may be Berenguier de Palazol, active around 1150, who wrote only cançons (love songs in the courtly tradition). Guerau III de Cabrera and Guillem de Berguedà, active in the generation after, were noted exponents of the ensenhamen and sirventes genres respectively. During this early period Occitan literature was patronised by the rulers of Catalonia—not surprisingly considering their wide involvement in Occitanian politics and as Counts of Provence. Alfonso II patronised many composers, not just from Catalonia, and even wrote Occitan poetry himself. The tradition of royal troubadours continued with his descendants Peter III and James II of Aragon, the anonymous known only as "Lo bord del rei d'Arago", and Frederick II of Sicily. The most prolific Catalan troubadour during the ascendancy of Occitan as language of literature, was Cerverí de Girona, who left behind more than one hundred works. He was the most prolific troubadour of any nationality.

In the early 13th century, Raimon Vidal, from Besalú, composed his poetic grammar, the Razos de trobar ("Purposes of Composition"). This was the earliest and perhaps most influential Occitan lyric treatise. The troubadour lyric followed the Catalans to Sicily later in the century, where Jaufre de Foixa composed a Regles de trobar ("Rules for Composing") modelled on Vidal's earlier work. A third Catalan treatise on the language of the troubadours and composing lyric poetry, the Mirall de trobar ("Mirror of Composition"), was written by a Mallorcan, Berenguer d'Anoia.

The first golden age of this language was developed in the Kingdom of Valencia around the 15th century under the variant of "Valenciano". The Catalan language consolidated and clearly differentiated, even in lyrical poetry, from Occitan language. The prose is widely cultivated, with influences from Italian humanism. Authors as the humanist Bernat Metge the preacher Vincent Ferrer, Francesc Eiximenis or Anselm Turmeda write works now considered as classical models of Catalan prose. The narrative and the fiction are shown in novels as Història de Jacob Xalabín, Paris e Viana or the chivalric roman Curial i Güelfa. In the 15th century the main centre of literary production is Valencia: the lyric poetry has outstanding Petrarchian poets: Jordi de Sant Jordi or Ausiàs Marc, or the elaborate poetry and prose of Joan Roís de Corella. In fiction could be outlined Jaume Roig's Espill or Tirant lo Blanc.

=== Tirant lo Blanc ===
Written by the Valencian writer Joanot Martorell, Tirant lo Blanc is an epic romance which was among the most influential novels of its time; it is possibly the last major book in Catalan literature until the 19th century.

== Modern era ==
=== La Decadència ===
The early modern period (late 15th-18th centuries), while extremely productive for Castilian writers of the Spanish Golden Age, was termed La Decadència by 19th century Catalan scholars and writers. This "decadent" period in Catalan literature came about because of a general decline in the use of the vernacular language and a lack of patronage among the nobility as Aragonese institutions declined. The Catalan-language decadence accompanied the rise of Catalan commercial influence in the Spanish Empire in which the use of Spanish language was essential after the dynastic union that resulted from the marriage of Ferdinand II of Aragon and Isabella I of Castile in 1474. Today, this is seen as a romantic view made popular by writers and thinkers of the 19th century national awakening movement known as Renaixença. The presumed period of decadence is being contested with the appearance of recent cultural and literary studies showing that there were indeed literary works of note in the period, from authors such as Cristòfor Despuig, Pere Serafí, Francesc Vicenç Garcia, Francesc Fontanella and Joan Ramis, among others.

=== Renaixença ===
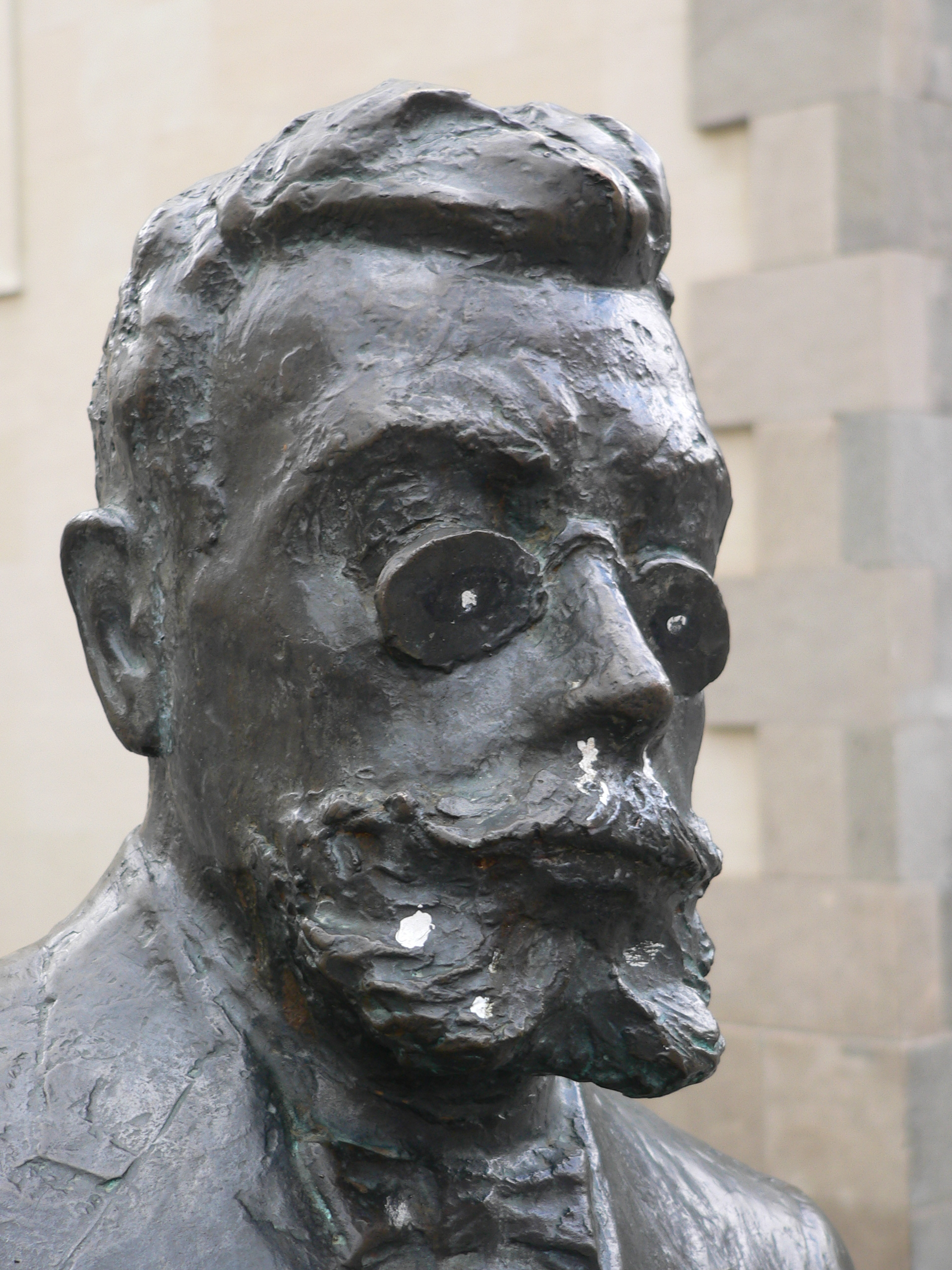
Àngel Guimerà

The first Romantics in Catalonia and the Balearic Islands chose Spanish as their language, and did not resort to using the Catalan language until a national awakening movement, kickstarted by Romantic nationalism, appeared. The foundation of the basis of the movement is most often credited to Bonaventura Carles Aribau with his Oda a la Pàtria. Renaixença or "rebirth". Literary Renaixença shares with European Romanticism most of its traits, but created a style of its own through its admiration of the Middle Ages and its will to embellish the language and the need to create a new common standard. Realism and naturalism deeply influenced later authors. Their most important adherents were indeed Jacint Verdaguer, who penned Catalonia's national epic, and Àngel Guimerà, whose plays were translated and performed around Europe.

=== Modernisme ===
Literary Catalan modernisme was the natural follow-up of Renaixença, still showing Romantic traits and influences while focusing on dark themes, such as violence or the dark side of life and nature. As for poetry, it closely followed the style of Parnassians and Symbolists. The movement was subdivided into authors in whose work prevailed darker decadentism themes, classed under the name Bohèmia Negra, and those whose career embraced Aestheticism, known as participants of Bohèmia Daurada or Bohèmia Rosa. Santiago Rusiñol, Joan Maragall and Joan Puig i Ferreter were some of its most influential adherents. Furthermore, it is necessary to allude to the seminal work of Miquel Costa i Llobera and Joan Alcover, Balearic poets who developed their work parallel to the heyday of Art Nouveau, whilst raising a conception of literature certainly antagonistic relative to them, and more comparable to classical poetry.

=== Noucentisme ===
The cultural and political movement known as Noucentisme appeared in the early 20th century, a time of great economic growth in Catalonia, as a mostly conservative reaction against Modernisme and the Avantgarde, both in art and thought. Its Classicism was framed as a "return to beauty." The love of elaborated form, along with its much sought perfection of language, was accused by modernistes of being excessively affected and artificial. Poetry was its preferred genre, as evidenced by Josep Carner or Carles Riba's masterpieces.

=== Francoist Spain, exile and political transition ===
After what seemed to be a period of hope and rapid growth, the Spanish Civil War and the establishment of Francoist Spain (starting in 1939) forced many Catalan leftist intellectuals into exile, as many of them faced political persecution.

During the initial years of Francoist Spain the use of Catalan in the media became frowned upon. Publishing in Catalan never ceased completely, though, even though only a few notable authors like Salvador Espriu did publish in this language in the first years of Francoist Spain. Those initial political restrictions on publishing in Catalan relaxed over time. By the 1950s publishing in Catalan was no longer extraordinary; by the 1960s it had become possible without restrictions other than the ideological ones which applied to all of Spain.

Some literary awards in Catalan had been established as early as 1947 (Premi Joanot Martorell). Also by the end of the 1940s well known authors such as Josep Maria de Sagarra were publishing again in Catalan (among others, El prestigi dels morts, 1946, L'Hereu i la forastera, 1949). Many other literary awards followed, like the Premi Carles de la Riba (1950), the Victor Català (1953) or the Lletra d'Or (1956). Since 1951, the most remarkable literary contest in Catalonia at the time (the Premio Ciudad de Barcelona) accepted originals in Catalan.

In 1962, Mercè Rodoreda published The Time of the Doves, possibly the book which paved the way of modern Catalan literature, since it could enjoy wider recognition due to the new media and the spreading of literacy in this language. In 1963, Spain won an international song contest with a piece sung in Catalan.

Later on that decade Josep Pla published what has been considered the masterpiece of the contemporary literature in Catalan, the seminal The Gray Notebook (El Quadern Gris, 1966). The Catalan cultural association Òmnium Cultural, which had been established in 1961, could begin its work in favour of Catalan literature by 1967 onwards. Salvador Espriu, who had published most of his works in Catalan, was a candidate for the Nobel Prize in Literature in 1971.

After the transition to democracy (1975–1978) and the restoration of the Catalan regional government Generalitat (1980), literary life and the editorial market have returned to normality and literary production in Catalan is being bolstered with a number of language policies intended to protect Catalan culture. Besides the aforementioned authors, other relevant 20th-century writers of the Francoist and democracy periods include Joan Brossa, Agustí Bartra, Manuel de Pedrolo, Pere Calders or Quim Monzó, Jesús Moncada or, in 21st century, Jaume Cabré or Albert Sánchez Piñol. The number of twenty-first century women writers increases like Dolors Miquel, Núria Perpinyà or Irene Solà.

== See also ==
- List of Catalan-language writers
- List of Catalan-language poets
