= Chronicle of Muntaner =

1325–28 Catalan history by Ramon Muntaner

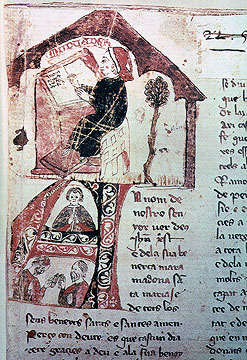
A miniature of Ramon Muntaner on folio 1 of the Escorial copy of his Chronicle (manuscript A, c.1340)

The Chronicle of Ramon Muntaner, written by the Catalan burgher and administrator Ramon Muntaner in Xirivella, Kingdom of Valencia, in 1325–1328, is the longest of what are known as "The Four Great Catalan Chronicles" of the 13th and 14th centuries. It narrates events relating to the history of the Crown of Aragon and to Muntaner's personal career in Iberia, Sicily, the Aegean and North Africa and spans the period from the conception of James I of Aragon in May 1207 to the coronation of Alfonso IV of Aragon in April 1328. Its character of "mirror of princes" and "mirror of citizens" has been pointed out by scholars.

The expedition of the Catalan Company to Byzantium in 1303, in which Muntaner took part as the treasurer of the company, forms the central episode of the chronicle, and likely provided the impulse for its composition. It enabled the author to frame his own experiences within the larger context of Catalan-Aragonese affairs in the Mediterranean. In presenting his account, Muntaner relies on his authority of an eyewitness, as evidenced by his frequent use of "I was there".

The Chronicle survives in eight medieval copies, of which the oldest dated one is from 1342. The first edition, which appeared in 1558, established the current subdivision of the work into 298 chapters and influenced the transmission of the text. Since the turn of the nineteenth century, the Chronicle has been the subject of studies by leading Catalan historians and philologists, among them Jaume Massó i Torrents, Lluís Nicolau d'Olwer, Josep Casacuberta, Ferran Soldevila and more recently Maria Teresa Ferrer i Mallol and Josep Antoni Aguilar Àvila, as well as by the Italian scholars Stefano Maria Cingolani and Veronica Orazi.

== Author ==
Ramon Muntaner was born in Peralada in 1265. He was the son of a remarkable family that hosted Jaume I the Conqueror (in 1274, Jaume I went to the Second Council of Lyon and sojourned in the Castle of Peralada with Alfonso X the Wise of Castile). This fact, which occurred when he was nine years old, was one of his most precious memories and he mentions this event with emotion in the Chronicle. In the same way that in the European novelist tradition (for example, Chrétien de Troyes ), it is exposed to us, how the vision of a great hero in the eyes of a child is capable of changing the course of his life. Muntaner says that the vision of James I when he was a child led him to devote himself as a writer explaining everything he had seen.

In 1285, Peralada was destroyed by the Almogavars during the Crusade against the Crown of Aragon and he had to emigrate. When he was twenty, Ramon Muntaner took part in the conquest of Menorca. Later, he participated in the fight against the French during the War of Sicily, in 1300 at the Siege of Messina, next to Roger de Flor and as the administrator of his company. In the summer of 1302, he began under the orders of this leader, the expedition to the East. In 1307, he left the company, and in 1311 he married.

In 1315, he had to travel between Sicily and Roussillon, as he was in charge of a delicate mission: to transport from Catania to Perpignan an orphan baby, the future Jaume III of Mallorca, in order to deliver him to his grandparents. From that moment on, his memoirs were removed and matured for ten years, until he had a revealing "dream" that prompted him, in 1325, at the age of sixty, in Valencia, to start writing the Chronicle, which he finished three years later. Muntaner died on Ibiza in 1336.

== Work ==
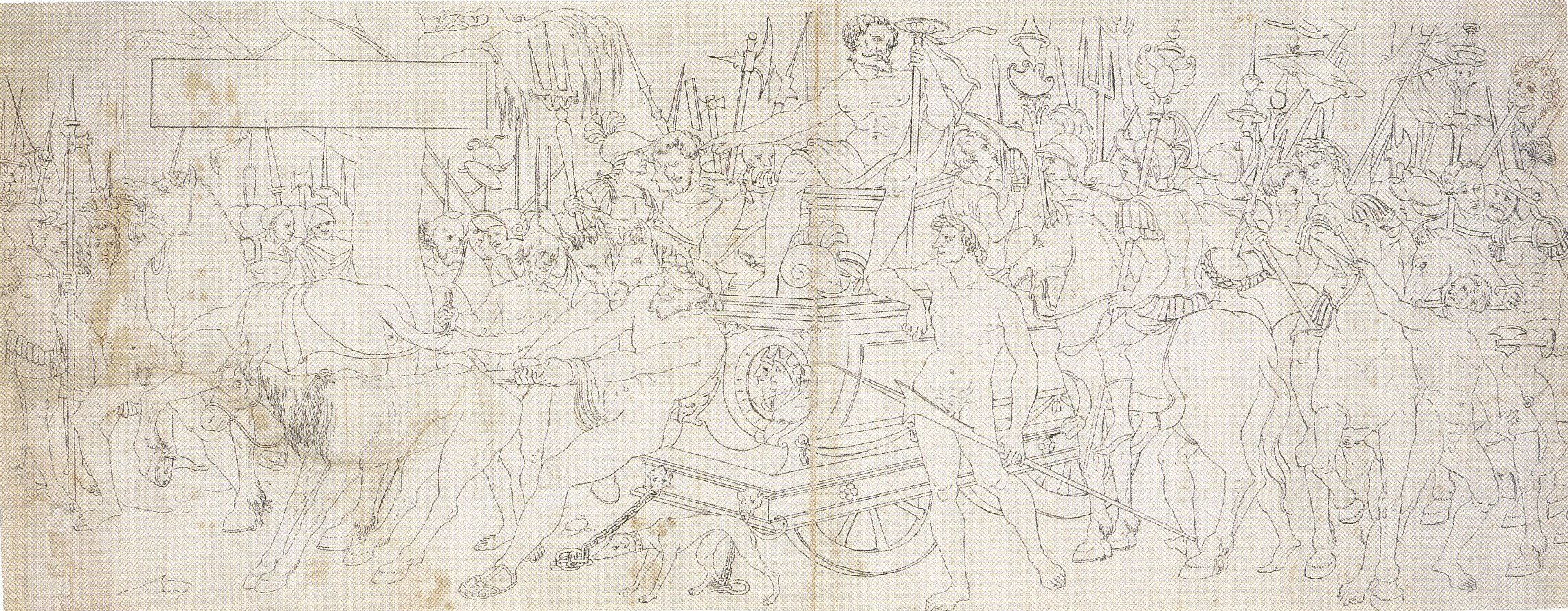
Sertorius and the Example of the Horses, after Hans Holbein the Younger. The drawing illustrates the example Sertorius gave to his followers that in the same way a horse's tail can be picked out hair by hair but not pulled out all at once, so smaller forces could defeat the Roman armies.

Muntaner had a personal relationship with all the kings of the House of Aragon, the House of Mallorca and the House of Sicily belonging to the lineage of the Casal de Barcelona that were contemporary to him. In doing his work, he mainly resorted to historiographic texts for the reigns of James I and Peter the Great, and, from Alfons el Franc, his almost exclusive source is his own experience.

The work was written to be read aloud. Whenever he addresses his "listeners", he usually calls them "lords". Muntaner managed to establish a rapport with his "listeners". To do this, he uses joglaresque procedures (such as the question "What should I say?"), As well as using lively and colloquial language

The fundamental purpose of the work is to glorify the kings of the House of Aragon. The chronicler loyalty to the crown is closely related to providentialism and nationalism. The blood, a common fate and the language (the "most beautiful catalanesc in the world") are the elements that make up the base of the Catalan and Aragonese community. It is impossible to find in the whole of medieval Europe anything that resembles the "national" maturity of the Chronicle

His life and adherence to the dynasty and the Catalan language, to which he expressed an extraordinary devotion, represent the counterweight to the centripetal forces within the Catalan national community resulting from the organization of conquered lands in new kingdoms (Mallorca, Valencia, Sicily) and, sometimes, the implantation of a new dynastic branch (Mallorca, Sicily). The awareness of the danger of division and the value of the union also explained it in his chronicle, especially in the example of the rush plant, "mata de jonc" in Catalan (Similar to the Sertorius horse tail example).

By virtue of this work, Ramón Muntaner also became the first author in the Catalan language to capture the aspirations of a large part of the Catalan elite for an Iberian political reunification, as he commented on Ariza's interview between the monarchs of the Crown of Aragon and the Crown of Castile, in which the latter proposed to Peter the Great an alliance between them, the king of Portugal and the king of Mallorca, Muntaner added: "... And, assuredly, he spoke the truth; if these four Kings of Spain whom he named, who are of one flesh and blood, held together, little need they fear all the other powers of the world..." (."..si aquests quatre reys que ell nomenava d'Espanya, qui són una carn e una sang, se teguessen ensemps, poch duptare tot laltre poder del món.").

== Discrepancies between the Chronicle of Muntaner and that of Pachymeres ==
Regarding the Catalan Company of the East, Ramon Muntaner began to write his chronicle in 1325, that is, 17 years after the Byzantine Greek George Pachymeres wrote his work De Michaele et Andronico Palæologis. While the work of Pachymeres offers the Greek vision of the facts, emphasizing the atrocities committed by the Company and Roger de Flor until 1308, the Chronicle of Ramon Muntaner is the only western source that relates the events in which the Catalan Company of the East took part. In some aspects, the work of Ramon Muntaner becomes, not only a glorification of Roger de Flor and the company, but also a counter-narrative to the work of Pachymeres, narrating some facts that the Greek omits, and eluding explaining events that the Greek author does report in detail. Some of these events are:

- Massacre of the Genoese: Pachymeres claims that the massacre began as a result of a debt that Roger de Flor had not paid to the Genoese, while Muntaner fails to explain why the confrontations began.
- Battle of Germe: although it was a minor battle, Muntaner says nothing about it.
- Summary executions at Germe: Pachymeres calls Roger de Flor bloodthirsty because he wanted to execute the Greek soldiers who had surrendered the fortress to the Turks, accusing them of cowardice. Muntaner says nothing about it.
- Summary executions at Kula: Again, Pachymeres calls Roger de Flor bloodthirsty because he wanted to execute the Greek soldiers who had surrendered the fortress to the Turks, accusing them of cowardice. Muntaner says nothing about it.
- War contributions to Philadelphia: Pachymeres explains that, after releasing the city of Philadelphia, Roger de Flor levied illegal and unwarranted war tributes on the city. Muntaner says nothing about it.
- War tribute levied on Ephesus: Pachymeres narrates that after Bernat de Rocafort met with Roger de Flor in Ephesus, he committed all kinds of atrocities to exact payment of additional tribute. Muntaner says nothing about it.
- The Siege of Magnesia: Pachymeres narrates that the governor of Magnesia executed the almogavar garrison that protected the company's treasure, seized it, and then withstood the siege that the Company laid on the city. Muntaner says nothing about it.
- Numbers: Pachymeres' source for citing the number of armies, and of people killed, wounded and captured is unknown. Muntaner's numbers invariably favor Roger de Flor and the Catalan Company of the East.

== Manuscripts and editions ==
Muntaner's work had great repercussions and diffusion during the fourteenth and fifteenth centuries, and was used, for example, in various passages of Tirant lo Blanc by Joanot Martorell. It was published for the first time in the sixteenth century, coinciding with a time of great revision of historiography; This first edition was commissioned and paid by the jurors of the city of Valencia. New printed editions took place during the 19th century, during the period of romantic exaltation of the European medieval past, even a translation into English made by the Hakluyt Society in 1920-21

=== Manuscripts ===
The sigla were proposed by Massó i Torrents and followed by Nicolau d'Olwer, Soldevila and Aguilar Àvila. Neither of the oldest manuscripts seems to have come from the hand of Muntaner himself, as they contain corruptions and omissions detectable by comparing them against one other.

- Manuscript A (dated by paleography to c.1340) – Real Biblioteca del Monasterio de San Lorenzo de El Escorial (Madrid), no. K-I-6. Paper (suggested origin from Xàtiva). Incomplete: only chapters 1–284 of 298, internal lacunae (e.g. chapter 20, 36 (whole), 51). Chapters 221–284 added in the 17th century. Medieval part copied in three different hands. Related most closely to E (according to Nicolau d'Olwer). Contains the miniature depicting Muntaner in the act of writing. Used in the partial critical editions of Nicolau d'Olwer and Aguilar Àvila, offers additions and corrections to the version in manuscript C.
- Manuscript B (undated, c.1400–1410) – Biblioteca regionale universitaria di Catania (Catania), Fondo Ventimiliano, no. 1/94. Parchment, suggested origin from Valencia. Incomplete, only chapters 1–279 of 298. Related most closely to D and to the 1558 editio princeps (according to Nicolau d'Olwer). Copied in at least two different hands. Used in the partial critical editions of Nicolau d'Olwer and Aguilar Àvila, offers additions and corrections to the version in manuscript C.
- Manuscript C (dated, 1342) – Biblioteca Nacional de España (Madrid), no. 1803. Paper. The only complete medieval copy, produced by a single hand. Characterised by the highest number of unique variants. Chapter divisions added after completion. Used in all twentieth-century critical (Nicolau d'Olwer, fragmentary) or semi-critical (Casacuberta) editions and editions dependent on them (Soldevila, Gustà, Escartí), all of which modernise the spelling, and in the recent fragmentary critical edition of Aguilar Àvila.
- Manuscript D (dated, 1353) – Biblioteca de Catalunya (Barcelona), no. 4. Paper. Incomplete, only chapters 146–298. Appears to be copied by a single hand. Taken into account as a source of emendations in the 1927–1952 edition by Casacuberta and again (with minor divergences) by Soldevila.
- Manuscript E (undated, between 1393 and 1420) – Biblioteca Universitària de Barcelona (Barcelona), no. 759. Paper. Incomplete, only chapters 119–298. Contains interpolations (e.g. between chapters 273–274) and a brief note of continuation on the royal marriage of 1328. Appears to be copied by a single hand. Taken into account as a source of emendations in the 1927–1952 edition by Casacuberta and again (with minor divergences) by Soldevila.

=== Editions ===
==== Complete ====
- 1558 Valencia editio princeps by the widow of Joan Mey Flandro: Chronicle or description of the acts and feats of the illustrious James (Jaume) the First, King of Aragon, Mallorca and Valencia, Count of Barcelona and Montpellier, and many of his descendants. Done by the magnificent in Ramon Muntaner, who served said illustrious King Jaume and his children and descendants and was present at the events contained in the present history.
- 1562 Barcelona second printed edition by Jaume Cortey: Chronicle or description of the acts and feats of the illustrious James (Jaume) the First, King of Aragon, Mallorca and Valencia, Count of Barcelona and Montpellier, and many of his descendants. Done by the magnificent in Ramon Muntaner, who served said illustrious King Jaume and his children and descendants and was present at the events contained in the present history.
- 1844 Stuttgart edition by Karl Lanz: Chronik des edlen en Ramon Muntaner. Based on the 1558 editio princeps and the 1562 edition
- 1860 Barcelona edition by Antoni Bofarull: Crónica catalana de Ramón Muntaner Based on the 1558 editio princeps. (Note: Contrary to what Goodenough says in her introduction (vol. 1, p. xxxiv), Bofarull does not claim to have consulted the Escorial manuscript (A).)
- 1886 Barcelona edition by Josep Coroleu: Crònica
- 1927–1952 Barcelona (Barcino) edition by Josep Maria Casacuberta, with the collaboration of Miquel Coll i Alentorn: Crònica. Based on manuscripts C, D and E
- 1971 Barcelona (Selecta) edition by Ferran Soldevila: Les quatre grans Cròniques, III. Crònica de Ramon Muntaner (revised by Jordi Bruguera and Maria Teresa Ferrer i Mallol, Barcelona: Institut d'Estudis Catalans, 2011). Based on manuscripts C, D and E
- 1973 Barcelona (Selecta) edition by J.F. Vidal-Jové and Bartomeu Bardagí: Crònica
- 1979 Barcelona (Ediciones 62) edition by Marina Gustà: Crònica (reprinted 1984, 1985, 1989, 1990, 1991, 1994, 1998). Based on manuscripts C, D and E
- 1999 Valencia (Institució Alfons el Magnànim) edition by Vicent Josep Escartí: Crònica. Based on manuscripts C, D and E
- 2006 Barcelona facsimile edition by Stefano Maria Cingolani in his La memòria dels reis. Les quatre grans cròniques i la historiografia catalana, des del segle X fins al XIV. Contains facsimiles of three of the four great chronicles from their first printed editions: 1557 by Joan Mei for the James I's Book of Deeds, 1616 by Sebastià Cormellas for the Chronicle of Desclot, and 1558 by Joan Mei for the Chronicle of Muntaner, plus the 1547 edition by Carles Amorós of the Chronicles of Spain by Pere Marsili

==== Fragmentary ====
- 1850 Palma de Mallorca edition by Josep Maria Quadrado: Conquesta de Mallorca
- 1878 Naples edition by Enric Cardona: Crònica
- 1879 Montpellier edition by Manuel Milà i Fontanals: Sermó (2a reedició 1881). Chapter 272. Based on manuscripts C and D, and the 1558 editio princeps
- 1926 Barcelona edition by Lluís Nicolau d'Olwer: L'expedició dels catalans a Orient (=The expedition of the Catalans to the East). Critical edition of chapters 194–244. Based on manuscripts A, B, C, D.
- 1932 Barcelona (Barcino) edition by Ramon Alòs-Moner: Pàgines escollides de Ramon Muntaner
- 1966 Barcelona edition by Ramon Sumoy: La croada de França contra els catalans (=The crusade of France against the Catalans)
- 2015 Barcelona (Institut d'Estudis Catalans) edition by Josep Maria Aguilar Àvila: La Crònica de Ramon Muntaner: edició i estudi (pròleg - capítol 146), vol. 2. (Note: Volume 1 of the publication is a study of the chronicle, while volume 2 contains a major contribution towards the long-awaited complete critical edition, covering chapters 1–146.) Critical edition of chapters 1–146. Based on manuscripts A, B, C, D and E

=== Translations ===
==== Complete ====
- 16th century. Castilian: Miguel Monterde, Chrónica o descripción de los fechos y hazañas del ínclyto rey D. Jayme primero, Rey de Aragón, de Mallorca y de Valencia, conde de Barcelona y de Monpeller y de muchos de sus descendientes, Real Biblioteca del Monasterio de San Lorenzo de El Escorial, MS no. J-III-25.
- 1827. French: Jean A.C. Buchon, Chronique de Ramon Muntaner, Paris: Verdière. 2 vols. (re-edited 1840 in Chroniques étrangères relatives aux expéditions françaises pendant le xiii e siècle, Paris: Auguste Desrez)
- 1842. German: Karl F. W. Lanz: Chronik des edlen En Ramon Muntaner. Chronica, o descripció dels fets, e hazanyes del inclyt Rey Don Iaume Primer e de molts de sos descendents, Leipzig. Based on the 1558 editio princeps and the 1562 edition.
- 1844. Italian: Filippo Moisè, Cronache catalane del secolo XIII e XIV. Una di Raimondo Muntaner, l’altra di Bernardo Desclot, Florence: Galileiana. 2 vols.
- 1921. English: Anna Kinsky Goodenough, The Chronicle of Muntaner, London: Hakluyt Society, vol. 1, vol. 2. Based on the edition of Bofarull, i.e. on the 1558 editio princeps.
- 1970. Spanish: Joan Fuster, Crónica, Madrid: Alianza.

==== Fragmentary ====
- 14th century. Sicilian: Anonymous. Edited by Vincenzo Di Giovanni, Cronache siciliane dei secoli XIII, XIV e XV, Bologna 1865 (a selection of 86 chapters relating to Sicilian affairs)
- 1994. Bulgarian: Rosica Panova, Хроника (Експедицията на каталонците на Изток), Sofia: Nauka i Izkustvo. Chapters 194–244. Based on the editions of Nicolau d'Olwer, Casacuberta, Soldevila, and Gustà (i.e. on manuscripts C, D and E).
- 1999. Italian: Maddalena Corrias (translator), Giuseppe Meloni (editor), Ramon Muntaner – Pietro IV of Aragona, La conquista della Sardegna nelle cronache catalane, Nuoro: Ilisso. Chapters 271–279, 282–290, and several other fragments relevant to Sardinia. Based on the editions of Casacuberta and Soldevila (i.e. on manuscripts C, D and E).
- 2002. French: Jean-Marie Barberà, Les almogavres: l’expédition des catalans en Orient, Toulouse: Anacharsis. Chapters 194–244. Does not state the edition used.
- 2006. English: Robert D. Hughes, The Catalan Expedition to the East: from the ‘Chronicle’ of Ramon Muntaner, Woodbridge: Tamesis. Chapters 194–244. Based on the editions of Nicolau d'Olwer, Soldevila and Escartí (i.e. on manuscripts C, D and E).

=== Paraphrases ===
- 1623. Spanish: Francisco of Moncada, Expedición de catalanes y aragoneses al Oriente, contra turcos y griegos, Barcelona (reprinted Madrid 1777).
- 1902. French: Gustave Schlumberger, Expédition des “almugavares” ou routiers catalans en Orient de l’an 1302 à l’an 1311, Paris (reprinted 1925).
- 1968. Spanish: Ramón Sender, Bizancio, Barcelona: Andorra.

== Exonyms in the chronicle ==
The links between the Crown of Aragon and other kingdoms and territories generated since the Middle Ages numerous exonyms that are nowadays almost forgotten, with the exception of Candia, now called Iraklion, on Crete. There follow some of the exonyms that appear in the Chronicle of Muntaner:

- Cetines, for Athens, capital of Greece
- Estives, for Thebes, city of Greece
- Port Jonc, for Pylos (also known as Navarino), city of Greece
- Taix, for Thasos, a Greek island
- Sant Jaume de Galicia, for Santiago de Compostela, capital of Galicia, Spain
- Sibília, for Seville, capital of Andalucia, Spain
- Saragossa de Sicília, for Siracusa, city of Sicily, Italy
- Xaca, for Sciacca, city of Sicily, Italy
- Sena, for Siena, city of Italy
- Florença, for Florence, city of Italy
- El Goi, for Gozo, an island of Malta
- Patraix, for Patras, city of Greece
- Xifellonia, for Cephalonia, island of Greece
- Curfo, for Corfu, island of Greece
- Brandis, for Brindisi, city of Italy
- Otrento, for Otranto, city of Italy
- Candia, current Heraklion, city of Crete

== See also ==
- Ramon Muntaner
- Catalan Company
- War of the Sicilian Vespers
- Aragonese conquest of Sardinia
- The four great chronicles
- Book of Deeds of James I
- Bernat Desclot
- Peter IV of Aragon

== Bibliography ==
- Keightley, Ronald G. (1979), "Muntaner and the Catalan Grand Company", Revista canadiense de estudios hispánicos, 4 (1): 37–58
- Cingolani, Stefano Maria (2007), La memòria dels reis. Les quatre grans cròniques i la historiografia catalana, des del segle X fins al XIV, Barcelona
- Soldevila, Ferran (2011), "Prefaci a la Crònica de Ramon Muntaner", in Bruguera, Jordi; Ferrer i Mallol, Maria Teresa (eds.), Les quatre grans Cròniques, III. Crònica de Ramon Muntaner, Barcelona: Institut d'Estudis Catalans, pp. 9–20, ISBN 9788499650357
- Aguilar Àvila, Josep Antoni (2015), La Crònica de Ramon Muntaner: edició i estudi (pròleg - capítol 146) (PDF), vol. 1, Barcelona: Institut d'Estudis Catalans, ISBN 978-84-9965-264-1
- Aguilar Àvila, Josep Antoni (2016), "Review of Les quatre grans Cròniques, IV. Crònica de Pere III el Cerimoniós, ed. Ferran Soldevila, Jordi Bruguera and Maria Teresa Ferrer i Mallol", Llengua & Literatura, 26: 178–185
