= Mural paintings of the conquest of Majorca =

1285–1290 paintings

Mural paintings of the Conquest of Majorca
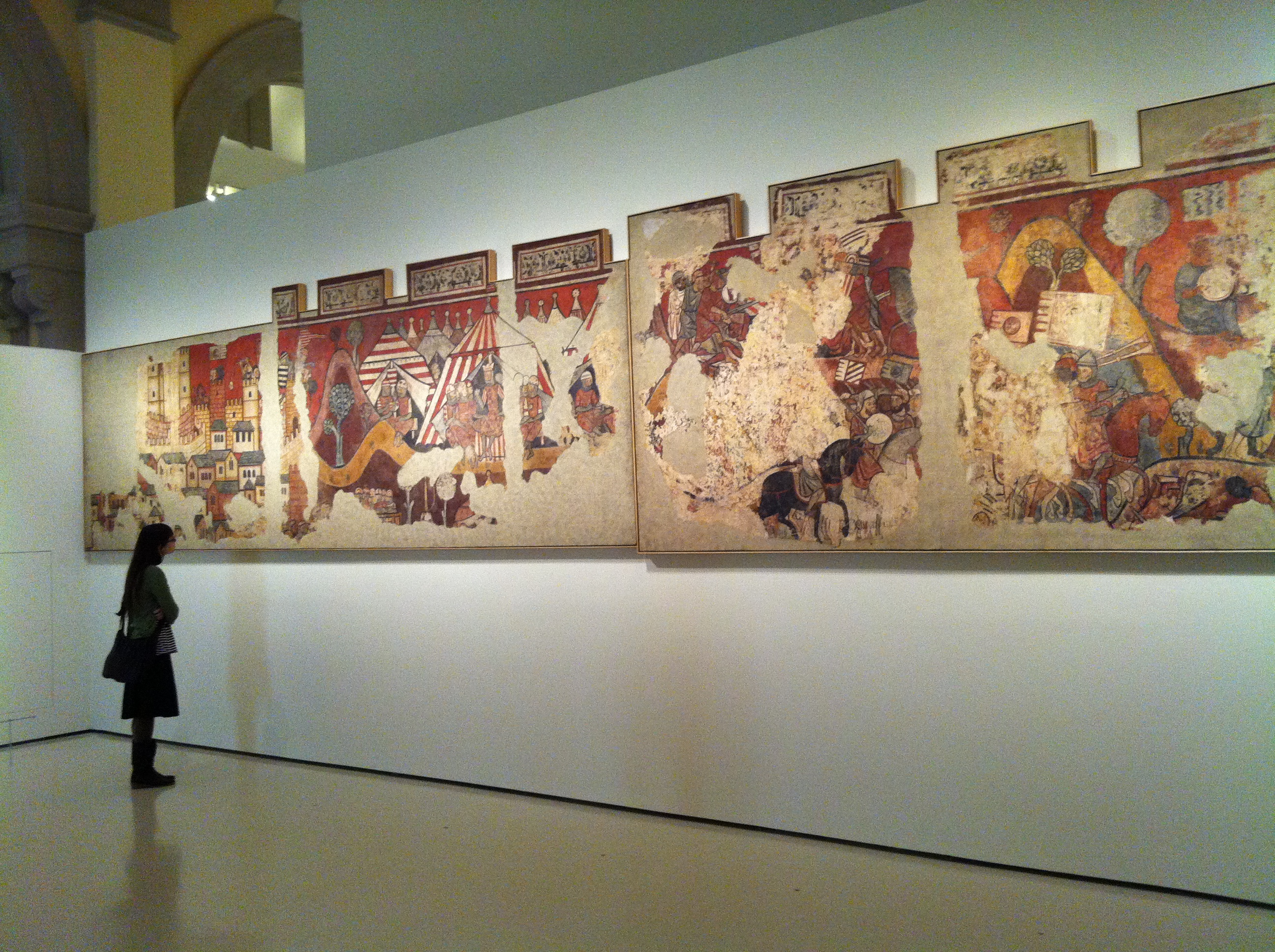
- Artist: Unknown
- Year: 1285–1290
- Type: Fresco transferred to canvas
- Dimensions: 178.2 cm × 530.5 cm (70.2 in × 208.9 in); 182.3 cm × 425.8 cm (71.8 in × 167.6 in); 153.6 cm × 412.4 cm (60.5 in × 162.4 in)
- Location: Museu Nacional d'Art de Catalunya, Barcelona

The Mural paintings of the Conquest of Majorca is a group of Gothic paintings, created on 1285-1290, conserved at the National Art Museum of Catalonia, in Barcelona, Spain.

== Description ==
The mural paintings of the Conquest of Majorca come from the former ancestral home of the Caldes family in Carrer Montcada in Barcelona, a building later known as Palau Aguilar (now hosting Museu Picasso). Discovered and removed in 1961, these paintings are one of the most important examples of early or Linear Gothic Catalan painting. This magnificent example of painting on historical subject matter narrates the conquest of the island of Majorca by James I the Conqueror in 1229. Like a painted chronicle, the episodes follow the detailed narrative of Catalan medieval accounts such as King James I's 'Llibre dels Feits' and Bernat Desclot's Crònica.

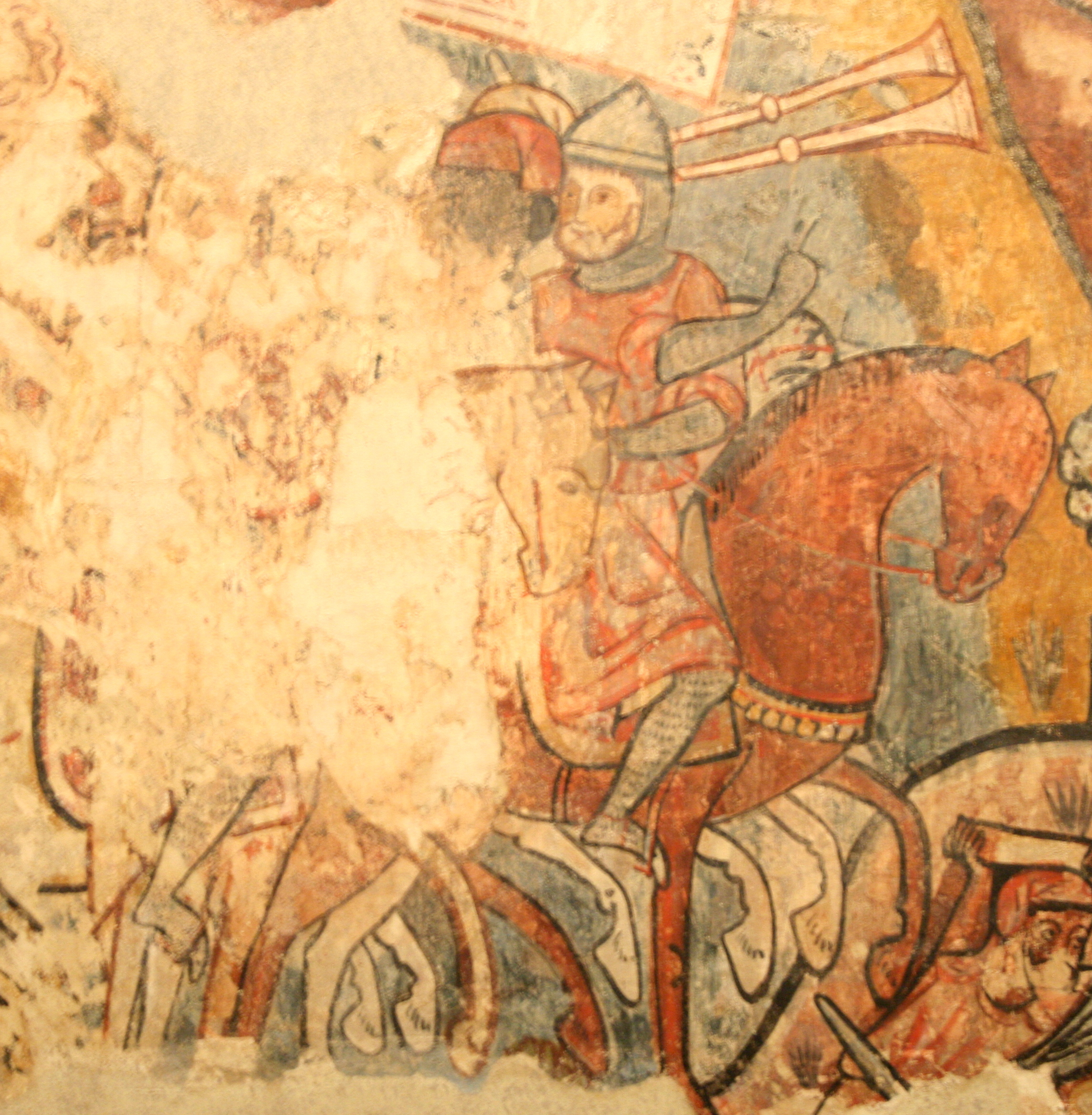
Trumpets of the Conquest of Mallorca-MNAC

== Pictorial Context ==
With regard to linear Gothic paintings in Catalan Counties at the time, a workshop began in Barcelona which undertook the task of realising fresco paintings on the walls of various palaces in the city. The most important of these resulting works can be named as: the paintings at Tinell Hall (Saló Tinell), the Royal Palace (Palau Reial Mayor) and Palau Aguilar.

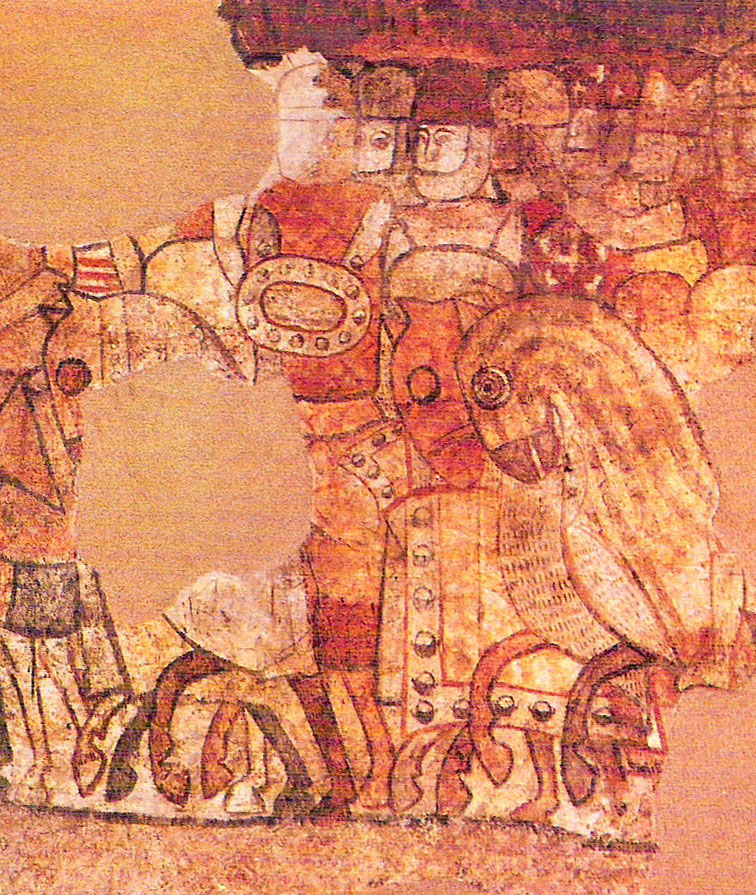
Detail of the Mural - Nunó Sanç

The frescoes were in no doubt executed by a workshop which realised commissions for Kings Alfonso the Candid (Alfonso el Franc) and James the Just (Jaume el Just), the nobility and clergy from both Barcelona and Majorca. Similarities are noted between the aforementioned palaces and the altarpiece of Santa Perpètua de Mogoda, Palma de Majorca, the altarpiece of Saint Ursula of the convent of Saint Francis, Palma, and the altarpiece of Saint Bernard, realised for the Templers and today on display in the Museum of Majorca.

It is believed that the first commission of the murals in Barcelona was by the King and some nobles and afterwards, by religious authorities on the island of Majorca.

Dalmaes i Pitrarch was also of the same opinion in relation to the workshop that ‘after working in Barcelona, made its way to Mallorca in 1300'.

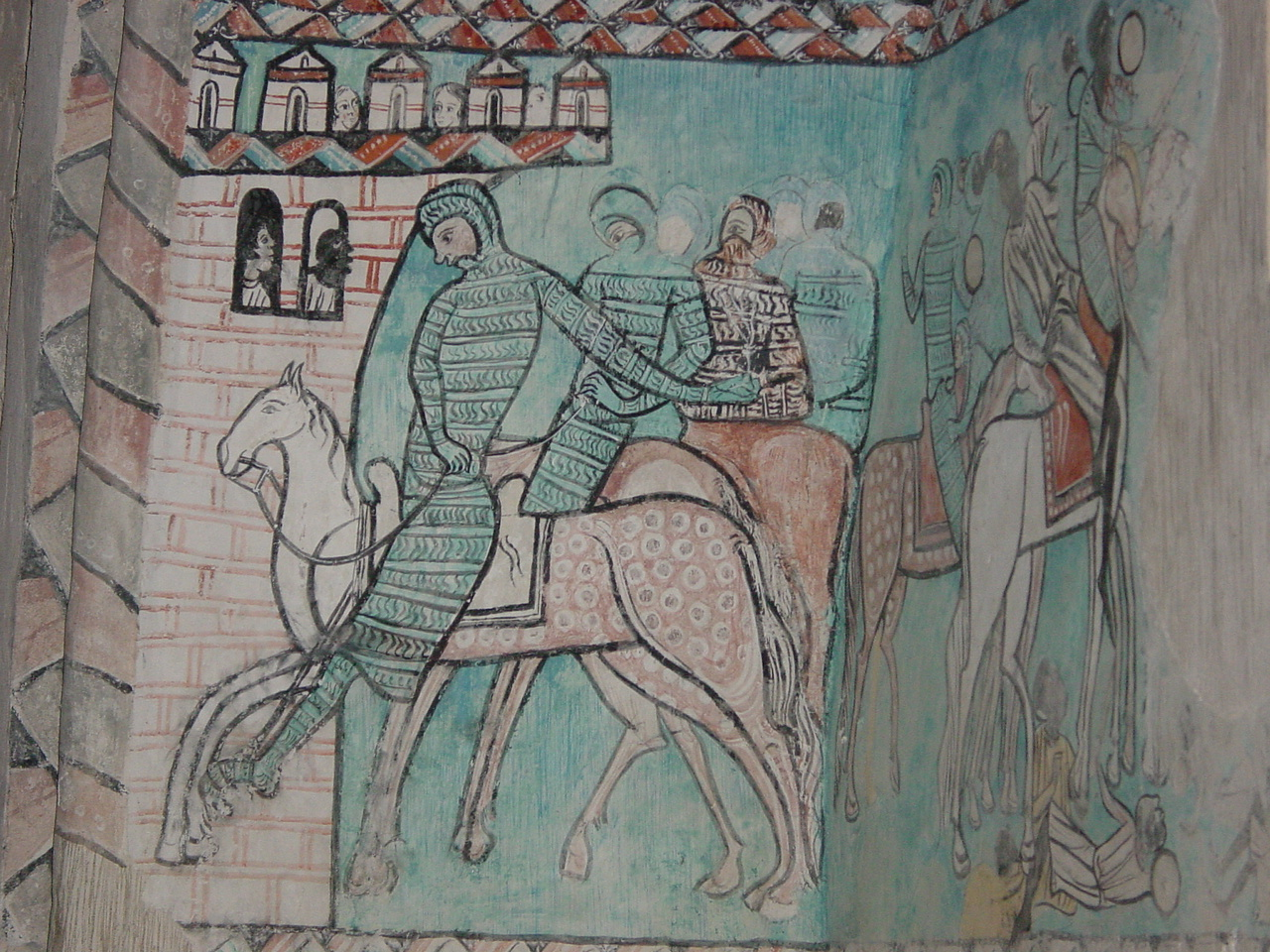
Detail of a mural conserved in the monastery of Santa María de Valbuena

Throughout the Iberian Peninsula these murals display a level of similarity and so have been compared to the paintings found in the Monastery of Santa Maria de Valbuena in Valladolid, which represents the Conquest of Arjona in 1244.

== Theme ==
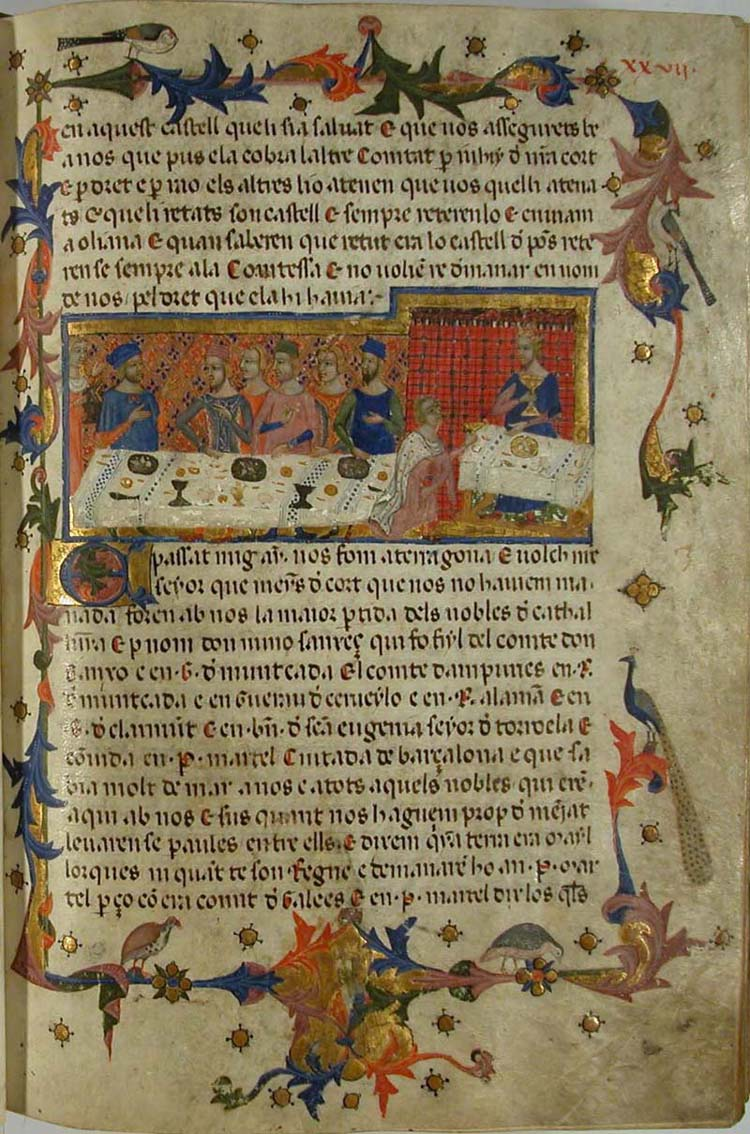
Llibre del Feits

The theme present in the narration of the conquest of Majorca 1229 is based on the literary sources of two of the greatest Catalan chronicles: the Llibre dels Feits and the Chronicle of Bernat Desclot, the latter having been written in 1283 and its final chapter between the years 1285 and 1295. These dates are around the same time as the completion of the mural paintings and during a time when Bernat Desclot held position as an official to the Royal Court.

=== Conquest of Majorca ===
A group of Catalan dignitaries, led by James I (Jaume I), met at the home of Pere Martell in the city of [Tarragona] during the second half of November 1228, in order to prepare for the conquest of Majorca. On 23 December 1228 the Courts gathered in Barcelona and after three days of deliberation, they agreed on the proposed expedition. The next year, on 5 September 1229, the Catalan ships set sail from Salou, Cambrils and Tarragona with course for landing at Santa Ponsa (Santa Ponça). Just one week later, on 12 September, the Moors were defeated during the battle of Portopí. On 31 December, after three months of a siege, the Catalan troops conquered Madina Mayurqa Abu-I-Ulà Idrís al-Mamun. This crusade was led by James I of Aragon and resulted in the destruction of the Almohad power on the island, the enslavement of the Andalus population and the repopulation of the island with Christians under a feudal regime and, the creation of the Kingdom of Majorca. Thus leading to a "purist" idea being brought to Majorca by the Christians who disapproved of Islamic Art and Traditions.

== Palau Aguilar ==
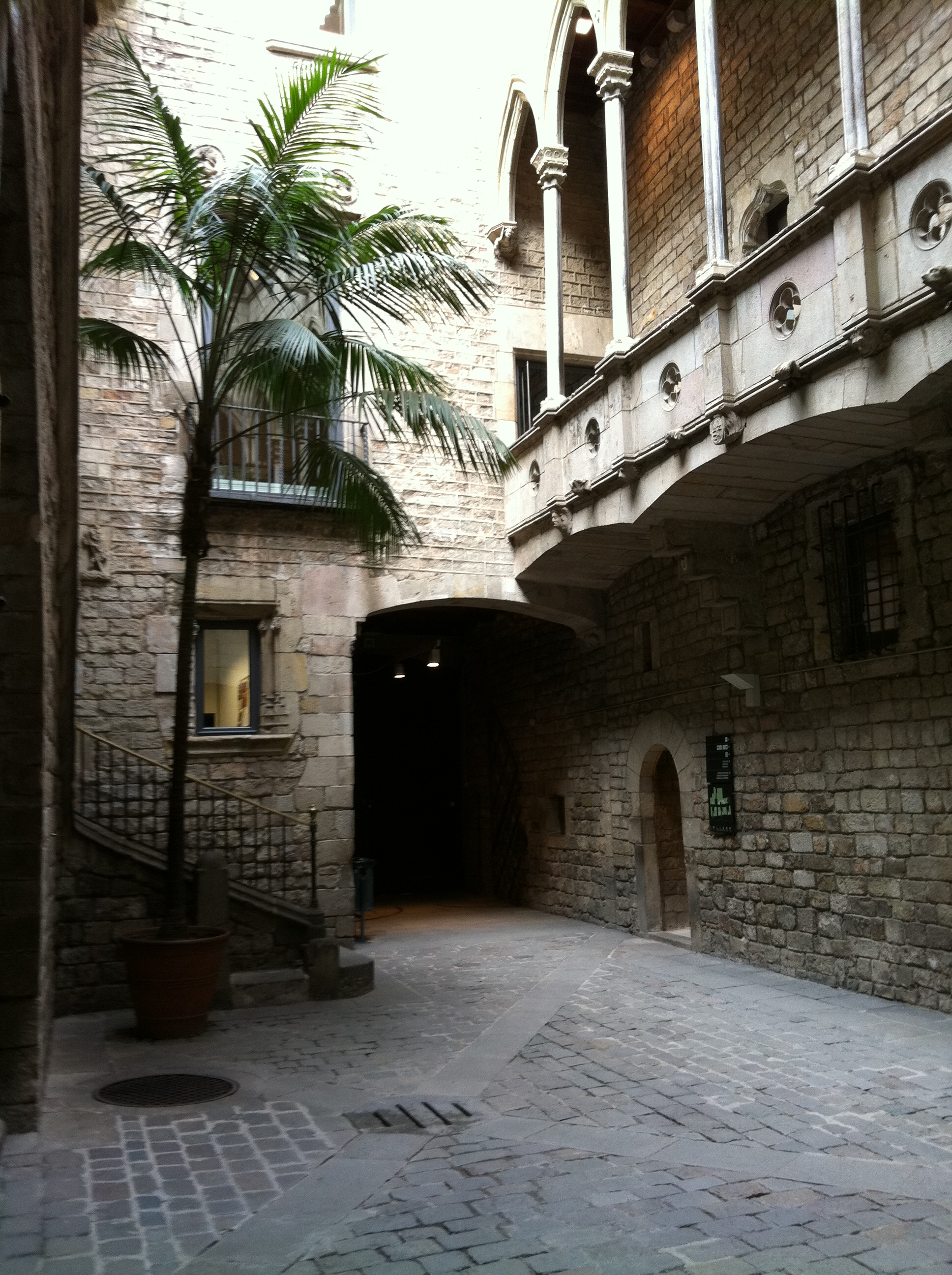
Interior Patio of Palau Aguilar

The palace where the paintings were discovered was constructed during the second half of the 13th century by the merchant Bernat de Caldes, who gave the building its initial title ‘Palau de Caldes’. It is situated at number 15 Montcada Street in Barcelona, in one of the main locations of the medieval old town, in a district named Arenas or Santa Maria del Mar. In the same room in the palace where the mural paintings were discovered a pot was also kept, depicting the family crest of the owners. Later, when the property changed owners, according to custom, the coat of arms of the new proprietors was painted on the pot, this time a lily and a rose on a tree – emblem of the Ledó family who owned the property between 1317 and 1335. The building belonged to several nobles of the Court of Aragon, until 1386 when the bourgeois family Coromines-Desplà acquired it and later sold it to Joan Berenguer d’Aguilar, for whom it became known by its current name, Palau Aguilar or Palau de Berenguer d’Aguilar.

When the Palau became municipal property from the year 1953 and while it was under restoration in 1961, for its future use as the home of the Picasso Museum, the mural paintings were discovered in a room near the central patio of the palace.

== Description ==
The three panels of paintings realised in the fresco technique and now found in MNAC, where they were translated to canvas for their conservation, are of a style categorised as 'linear gothic' and dated between 1285 and 1290. They were restored in 1961 and although there are fragments missing, it is recognised that the series depicts three scenes; ‘the meeting of the Counts of Barcelona’, ‘the Battle of Porto Pi’ and the ‘Royal Camp and assault on the city of Majorca¡.

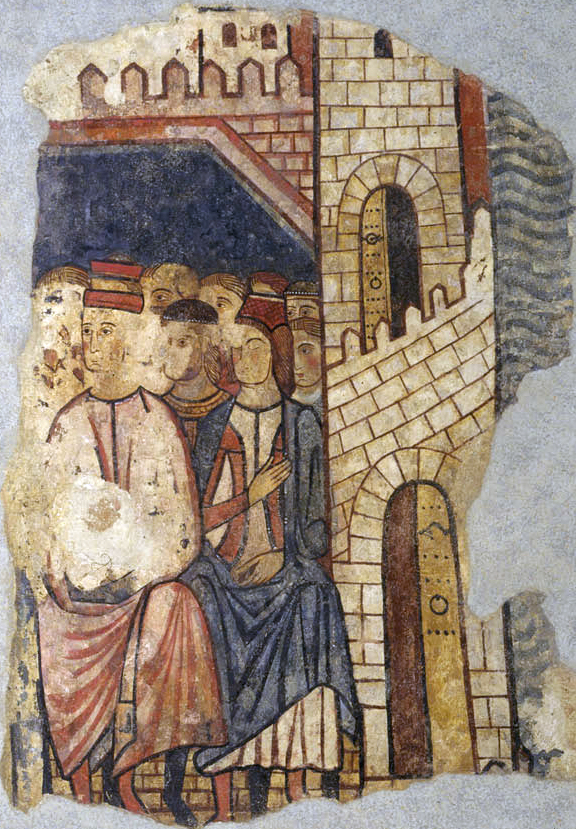
The meeting of the counts in Barcelona, December 1228

The composition of the work displays a Romanesque tendency, although there is a distinct realism in the details of the work and the background of the scenes have been treated with details of landscape, rather than being a flat pictorial space. Together with the interest shown in treating the figures with expression and representing portraits, there is an apparent trend and interest in a Franco-gothic style of painting. The first panel where the narration commences – from left to right- is identified as the ‘Courts of Barcelona’. The representation is observed in the depiction of the walls of Barcelona, from which rise the bell tower of the cathedral. There is also group of people depicted, which probably corresponds to the meeting of parliament which was held in December 1228 to decide the details of the military assault on Majorca. Fragments of a painting are also seen which may correspond to the scene of a naval battle.

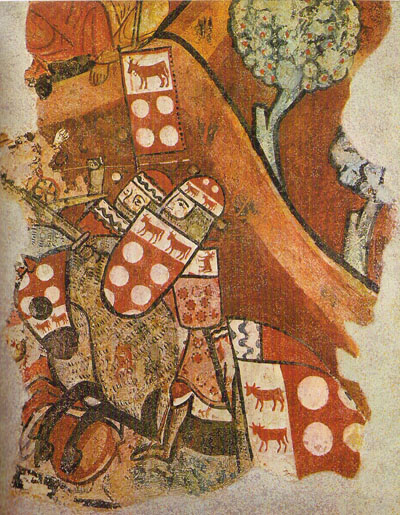
Detail of Guillem II de Montcada i de Bearn

The second panel corresponds to the depiction of the ‘Battle of Porto Pi’. On 11 September 1229 James I diploid his troops in the Bay of Santa Ponsa, that same day the decisive battle of Portopí against the Muslims took place. The background of the panel is rendered with mountains and trees, in the mountains a group of Moors are depicted whereas in the foreground the battle is observed, the battle in which Guillem II de Montcada i de Bearn met his death. He is shown riding his horse and brandishing a sword and shield where the coat of arms of his lineage appear; the bessants of Montcada and the oxen of Bearn, which are also found represented on his horses’ caparison. Gillem II is being pursued by an unidentified knight, heading towards the Saracen troops; as found in the description of these events chronicled by Bernat Desclot.

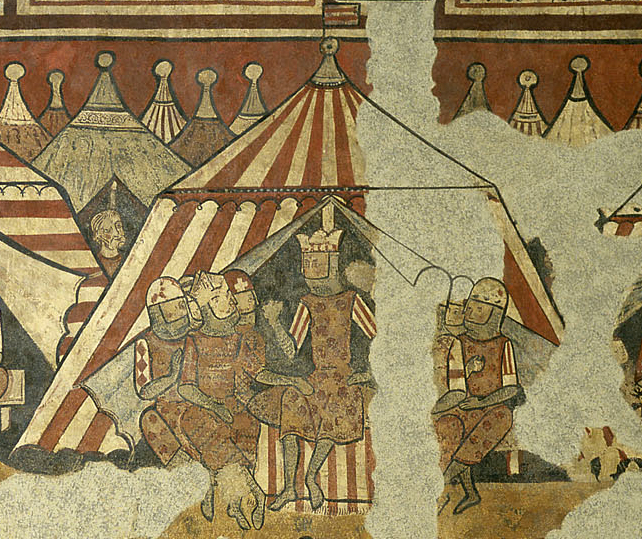
Detail of the Royal Tent with King Jaume I

The final panel shows the ‘Royal Camp and the attack on the city of Majorca’. The camp is shown on the right hand side with the royal tent of yellow and red. James I is depicted in the foreground, represented in the centre of a group of knights. On James I's left stand three representatives, one of which has been identified as Nunó Sanç, count of Roselló. To the right hand side King Guilabert de Cruïlles is depicted, wearing a red helmet with a white cross and his hand resting on the knee of King James I. The bishop of Barcelona stands to the right of Guilabert shown wearing his mitre, and to his side the knight Ramon de Centells is found. The tent situated to the left of the King's, with the horizontal red stripes, is that of the Count of Empurias Hug V d’Empúries, who is found conversing with the Aragonese knight Pero Maça de Sangarrén. They are shown separated from the other group and the King this representation being true to the accounts which tell of the Count d’Empúries’ disagreement with King James I. The spaces between the two depicted tents and the figures of the composition were filled with the suggestion of other tents, creating the pictorial notion of a vast army camp. The assault on Medina Mayurqa is represented beneath the depiction of the royal tent. Here what could be described as a trebuchet is depicted and to its side a group of soldiers who are heading towards the city who find themselves clashing with a group of Saracens. A wall with towers surrounding a city full of houses, in the centre of which the castle of Almundaina can be seen, protected by a double wall.

The nearest tower to the camp has been assaulted by two men bearing the Royal crest and who are shown fighting against two Moors, whilst the other towers depicted in the distance are still being defended by the Saracens.

== Style ==
These paintings pertain to the military genre of historical painting or profane works in commemoration of heroic feats and gestures. A similar example of the same era is a painting found on a vaulted niche conserved in MNAC, belonging to Saint Vincent of Cardona, where the siege of Girona (1285)/ The defense of Girona (1285) is depicted. This event was also described in the chronicles of Bernat Desclot. It is one of the works that could be attributed to the master of the Conquest of Majorca. A little later, during the beginning of the 14th century, there are other works in a similar style of linear gothic which are found in the tower of the castle of Alcanyís, which portray the Conquest of Valencia by James I. The stylistic affinity is clear when these paintings are compared with the murals of the Palau Reial Major; both date from between 1285 and 1290, and both of which, in addition to the same subject, were realised using the majority of colours of red, blue, black and ochre, with a linear stroke deeply marked in black. This narrative of the painting is depicted in reverse to that of its written version, that is, from right to left, with great affinity in its narrative. There has been no conclusion as to which of the two series of paintings was realised first; that of the Palau Reail Major or, that of the Palau Aguilar. That of the Palau Reial Major may have been the first to be painted as the style of the work is found to be more epic and monumental in its representation of the military parades; the figures being depicted as more compact than those found in the work of Palau Aguilar. The work of Palau Aguilar more creative freedom can be observed, a creative freedom that perhaps would not have been apt for the destiny as a mural for a royal reception hall. The coincidence that these murals were executed in the same style and subject matter in both palaces was resolved with the discovery that Dolçe de Caldes, daughter of Bernat de Caldes (owner of Palau Aguiler), at the time of the death of King Alfonso the Candid, was pregnant with Alfonso's child. The King, before his death in 1291, asked his brother James (future king James the Just) to look after Dolçe and the son she was expecting by King Alfonso.

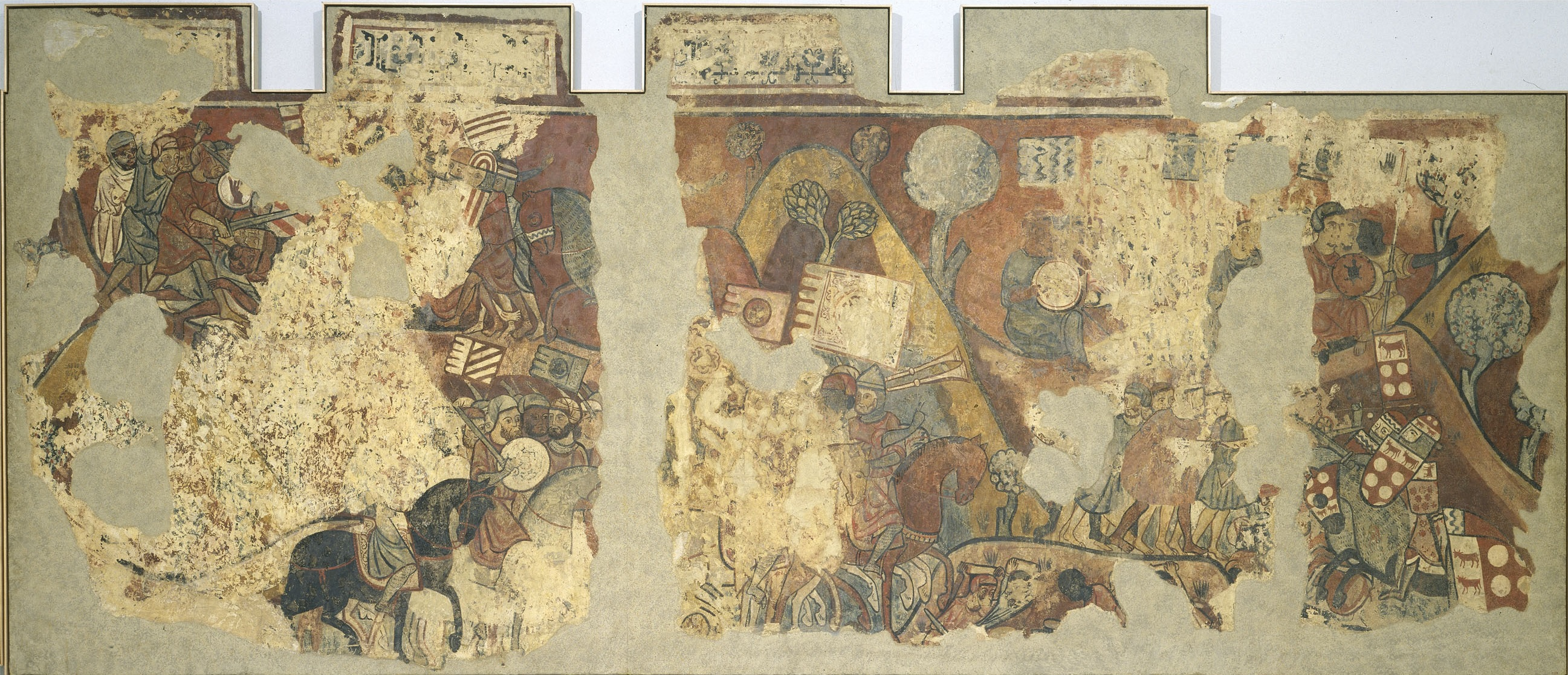
The panel depicting the Battle of Porto Pi

=== Iconography ===
The iconography which illustrated military chronicles or legendary tales was numerous in the 13th century, like that of Lancelot by Chrétien de Troyes or the fresco paintings which adorned the palaces of noble knights who wished to remain immortalised in their heroic exploits. Moreover, in Barcelona, there is a narrative of the battle of William the Orange at the Tour Ferrando in Pernes (Valdusa) and another example from a little later being the mural painting in the Piazza Publico of Siena in which Capitan Guidoricco da Fogliano is represented as conqueror of the city – a work which was created by Simone Martini.

== See also ==
- Battle of Portopí
- Conquest of Majorca
