= De procinctu romanae miliciae =

Latin treatise written by Hrabanus Maurus

Chapters VIII–XI of De procinctu

De procinctu romanae miliciae (On the Training of the Roman Army) is a short Latin treatise on the Roman army written by Hrabanus Maurus for the Frankish king Lothair II in 855 or 856. It is an epitome of an epitome, being based on the Epitoma rei militaris of Flavius Vegetius Renatus from around the year 400. The purpose of the work—whether it was practical and to what extent the selection of material reflects the realities of the Frankish army—is a matter of debate.

Hrabanus must have written De procinctu after 29 September 855, when Lothair I divided his kingdom of Middle Francia among his sons, and before his own death on 4 February 856.

== Context ==
As Hrabanus was a subject of King Louis the German, Lothair II's uncle, De procinctu was probably conceived as a diplomatic gift on the occasion of Lothair's accession, when he was recognized by and entered into alliance with Louis the German. Lothair was only about 18 years old at the time, which may explain why Hrabanus abridged and adapted the work of Vegetius, simplifying its Latin.

== Content ==
After a brief prologue, De procinctu is divided into fifteen numbered and titled chapters. The quotations from Vegetius are taken entirely from sixteen chapters of the first book of the Epitoma and two chapters of the second book. De procinctu rarely retains the exact wording of its source. The information retained may be only what was deemed useful and relevant to Frankish army. The emphasis is on training, especially for the march and for infantry to maintain formation during attacks.

In chapter three, Hrabanus quotes what seems to be a Frankish proverb: "In youth, one can become a horseman, but at an older age, either hardly or never." Other minor additions include a comment on the Franks' continuing to practise mounting horses from both sides without the aid of stirrups and a comment on recruiting bear hunters to the army. Finally, he reworks Vegetius account of the soldier's fides (faith, loyalty) to the Roman res publica (republic, state) for life, liberty and earthly rewards into an account of the Christian soldier's defence of his liberty, his king and his country (patria) with his faith being rewarded by eternal life. Dying for one's king and going straight to heaven after dying in battle are unusual notions in a Frankish treatise, but the merit of keeping one's faith until death is the key idea for Hrabanus.

== Transmission ==
It was known that Hrabanus had written a military treatise even before the treatise De procinctu was discovered by Jakob Marx in the 19th century. In the preface to his treatise De anima (On the Soul), addressed to Lothair, Hrabanus refers to the appendix on the ancient methods of training soldiers that he excerpted from Vegetius for the king, considering them useful in light of recent barbarian invasions. He selected, he says, only what was relevant in "modern times" (tempore moderno) and provided annotations. Marx identified Hrabanus's treatise in the text De procinctu in manuscript Abt. 95 Nr. 133c of the episcopal archive in Trier. It immediately precedes a copy of the Planctus de obitu Karoli. Although the Trier copy of De procinctu does not name its author, it is clear from the prologue that it is the work mentioned by Hrabanus in De anima. Charles West calls these two treatises "two wings of a single work".

An edition of the Latin text has been published by Ernst Dümmler. It has been translated into English by Charles West. In both, the chapters appear misnumbered, so that there are two chapter sixes.

== Works cited ==
- Allmand, Christopher (2011). The De Re Militari of Vegetius: The Reception, Transmission and Legacy of a Roman Text in the Middle Ages. Cambridge University Press.
- Bachrach, Bernard S. (2001). Early Carolingian Warfare: Prelude to Empire. University of Pennsylvania Press.
- Dümmler, Ernst (1872). "De procinctv romanae miliciae". Zeitschrift für deutsches Alterthum. 15: 443–451. JSTOR 20648389.
- Reeve, Michael D. (2000). "The Transmission of Vegetius's Epitoma rei militaris". Aevum. 74 (Fasc. 1): 243–354. JSTOR 20861051.
- West, Charles (2024). "Hraban Maurus, 'On the Training of the Roman Army'". Earlier Medieval History. University of Edinburgh.
- West, Charles (2026). "Archbishop Hraban Maurus, Lothar II and the Roman Army". In Jens Schneider; Isabelle Rosé; Tristan Martine; Thomas Lienhard; Sylvie Joye; Justine Audebrand (eds.). Autorité de l'évêque – Autorité de l'écrit / Autorität der Bischöfe – Autorität des Wortes: Études en hommage à Geneviève Bührer-Thierry / Beiträge zu Ehren von Geneviève Bührer-Thierry. Brill. pp. 167–174. doi:10.30965/9783846769232.
