= Stablein =

Stablein is a surname. Notable people with the surname include:

- Brian Stablein (born 1970), American football player
- Bruno Stäblein (1895–1978), German musicologist
- George Stablein (born 1957), American baseball player
- Marilyn Stablein (born 1946), American poet, writer and artist
