= Swan Sequence =

9th-century Latin poem

The Swan Sequence (incipit: Clangam, filii "I shall cry out, my sons") (Note: Some manuscripts have Plangant, filii.) is an anonymous Carolingian-Aquitainian Latin poem sequence first written around 850. Its melody, Planctus cygni (Note: Variants include: planctus (cigni) filii plangant, sequentia candidi planctus cigni, and just plangam.) ("Swan's Lament"), was popular for some two centuries after its composition.

== Plot summary ==
In the sequence the swan has left the flowery land and is trapped on the ocean amidst terrible waves, unable to fly away. She longs for fish, but is unable to catch them; she looks up longingly at Orion. She prays for light to replace her darkness and, when the dawn finally comes, rises to the stars and flies to land. Then all the birds rejoice, praise God, and sing a doxology. (Note: The gathering of birds should not be read as a proto-Parliament of Fowls (Godman, 70).)

== Sources ==
The Swan Sequence is found in the earliest troper–sequentiary (BnF lat. 1240) from the Abbey of Saint-Martial in Limoges. By shortly after about 1100 it was no long being used or copied. Its last manuscript appearance is in the Norman manuscript BL Roy. 8 C xiii from around 1100.

The melody is preserved, with or without text, in some twenty different manuscripts.

The twelfth-century Goliardic poem Olim lacus, one of the Carmina Burana, is possibly a parody of the Swan Sequence, in which the swan is roasted for dinner.

== Melody ==
In the manuscripts in which it appears without text, its melody is called the Planctus cygni ("Swan's Lament") or variants thereof.

It was used for Sunday church services at Limoges and Winchester during the tenth century. During the eleventh it was a common melody for liturgical texts for the feast of the Holy Innocents (28 December); during the twelfth century it was a common setting for Whitsun sequences in southern France and northern Spain. Its melody differs in important ways from Gregorian chant and shares some characteristics with the lai. It is remarkably similar to another sequence, the Berta vetula of the Winchester Troper.

== Textual analysis ==
In language it is neither classical Latin nor unlearned. Two neologisms (alatizo, "I flap my wings", and ovatizans, "rejoicing") appear, based on Greek. In general the poem exhibits verbal enigma and experimentation. Structurally the poem is syllabic with proparoxytone rhythm and inconsistent (half-)rhymes; it consistently ends on the sound -a. This last feature (assonance) may suggest a connection with the liturgical Alleluia.

The Swan Sequence, along with the rest of Carolingian and vernacular literature, are borrowing from the patristic, exegetical, and liturgical traditions. The Swan Sequence may be seen as a dramatisation of them. (Note: Godman, 71, remarks that it is tied most closely of all the sequences ("children of the liturgy" in the words of Wolfram von den Steinen) to its mother, the liturgy.)

To one medieval copyist of the text it was an allegory of the fall of man (allegoria ac de cigno ad lapsum hominis), to which Peter Godman adds redemption. In 1962 Bruno Stäblein argued that it was composed in the late ninth- or early tenth-century based on an older melody descended from a ritual Germanic planctus for a lost hero; Stäblein suggests commonalities with Beowulf (lines 3169ff). Godman denies any relationship to the Beowulf genre on the absence of animal imagery in the mourning passages, and suggests the ceremonies surrounding the death of Attila the Hun as recounted by Jordanes (Getica 49) or the mourning over Patroclus as presented by Homer (Iliad 24.16ff). (Note: Nevertheless, it does not belong to the genres of heroic poetry or Germanic beast literature (Godman, 69).)

Hans Spanke has furthered the religious interpretation, noting the resemblance to certain liturgical sequences and the presence of a short doxology, to which Godman adds the opening religious address to filii ("sons"). Other interpretations of the song include: An allegory of the Prodigal Son and an adaptation of the Greek myth of the holy swans of Apollo coming from the north.

Patristic literature, earlier Carolingian literature, and early vernacular literature all use avian imagery for the wandering, searching mind or soul. It is found in Ambrose, Augustine, and Alcuin, and in the Old English poems The Wanderer and The Seafarer; (Note: These Old English poems date probably from the eleventh century and so could not have been influences on the Swan Sequence, though The Wanderer may have had an oral precursor.) in The Phoenix of Lactantius, in the Dialogues (iv.10) of Gregory the Great, in The Consolation of Philosophy (IV.i.1) of Boethius, and in the Vita Sancti Gregorii Magni of a monk of Whitby (c. 704–714).

== Online translations ==
- by Kate Brown with the help of Isobel Preece
