= Blanquerna =

1285 novel by Ramon Llull

The Romance of Evast and Blaquerna (Old Catalan: Romanç d'Evast e Blaquerna), often shortened to Blaquerna or Blanquerna, is a novel written in Catalan between 1283 and 1285 by the Majorcan Ramon Llull. It chronicles the life of its eponymous hero. It is the first major work of literature written in the Balearic Islands, regarded as a founding work of Catalan literature and one of the first European novels.

== Structure ==
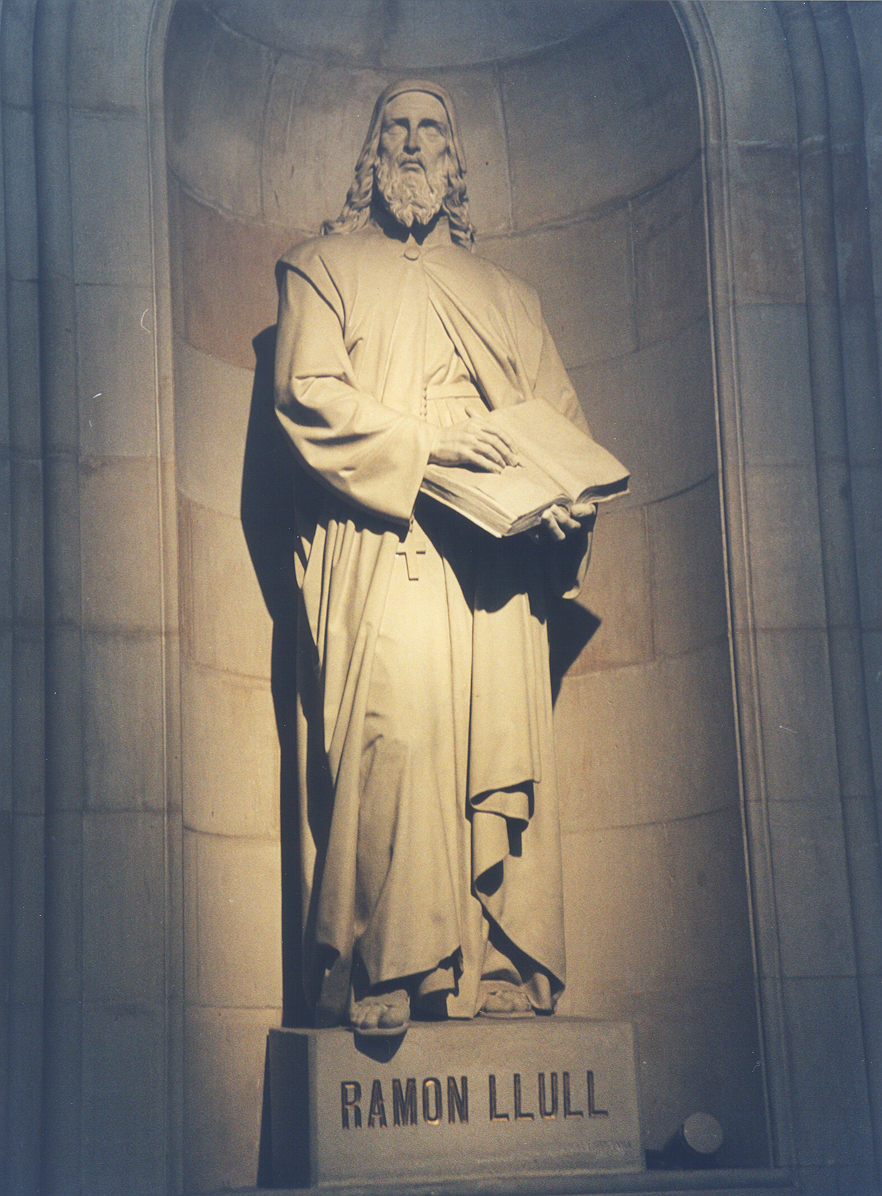
Raymond Llull

The novel is divided into five parts. Llull's Llibre d'Amic e d'Amat (Book of the Friend and Beloved) is often included as a semiautonomous section within Blanquerna.

== Plot summary ==
The central character of the novel named after him, Blanquerna, was born to Evast and Aloma. Before marrying, Evast, a nobleman, had wanted to follow a religious life but at the same time wished to experience matrimony. He became a merchant after his marriage to Aloma, and he gives his son an education based on religious and philosophical pursuits.

In the second part of the novel, Blanquerna confronts the same choice his father did: between a celibate life and a married one. Blanquerna decides to become a hermit, which saddens his mother; she tries to have her son marry the beautiful Cana. But Blanquerna persuades Cana to become a nun, and she later becomes an abbess. Blanquerna also faces sexual temptation in the form of a maiden named Natana. This second part includes a description of the seven sins.

In parts three through five of the novel, Blanquerna, having chosen a religious life, becomes a monk (though he desires to become a hermit instead), and quickly becomes an abbot. In time, he is elected pope.

The road to the papacy is not easy; Blanquerna is constantly faced with troublesome decisions and temptations, and he is not perfect. Indeed, Blanquerna "is made credible precisely because he is prone to make mistakes and to experience temptation, and in the end this gives him an authority which other authorities are obliged to recognize." Blanquerna's life takes him through widely varying places and social strata, from uninhabited forests and wildernesses to the dense Roman urban landscape of thieves and prostitutes, from interactions with young maidens to interactions with popes and emperors.

As he matures, Blanquerna listens to the advice of a jongleur, a "wise fool" named Ramon. Blanquerna reforms the Church completely as pope, with Ramon’s help, and finally becomes the hermit he had always desired to be. As a hermit, he composes a book of meditations to help his fellow hermits defeat temptation: this is the Llibre d'Amic e d'Amat, which consists of 365 love poems. This text "purports to offer the protagonist’s mystical confessions, based on personal experience and examples of 'Sufi preachers,' as a guide to contemplation within the apostolic utopia of a reform of contemporary Christendom."

== Selected verses ==
27 The bird was singing in the garden of the Beloved. The Lover came and said to the bird: - If we don’t understand each other through language, let’s communicate through love, because your song represents my Beloved to my eyes.

295 The Lover was in danger in the great sea of love; and he trusted his Beloved, who came to rescue him with tribulations, thoughts, tears and cries, sighs and sorrows, since the sea was one of love and also made to honour his principles.

== English translation ==
- Romance of Evast and Blaquerna. Translated by Robert D. Hughes. Barcelona: Barcino-Tamesis, 2017.

== See also ==
- Catalan literature
