= The Four Great Catalan Chronicles =

The Four Great Catalan Chronicles (Catalan: Les quatre grans Cròniques) were written between the late 13th century and the mid 14th century. The Chronicles narrate events of the lives of James I of Aragon, Bernat Desclot, Ramon Muntaner and Pere el Cerimoniós. The four chronicles were written with the same purpose: to justify the political actions of the rulers as well as passing their political knowledge onto their descendants. They are among the most complete historiographical sets of documents of medieval Europe, and are valued by historians for their detailed descriptions of the social and political aspects of Catalan feudal society.

== The Four Great Catalan Chronicles ==
The Four Great Catalan Chronicles are:

The Chronicle of James I of Aragon (Llibre dels fets) There are two versions of this work. The first, which is titled Llibre dels fets, is written in Catalan. The second, which is titled Libre Gestarum, is written in Latin and is signed by Pere Marsili; dating from 1313. Because of the historical events that took place between the years 1272 and 1274, it is generally agreed by scholars that this chronicle was possibly written during the last years of James I's reign. Nevertheless, both versions of the chronicles recount the same facts—the only difference between them is the literary form in which they were written. While the Catalan version is written in first person singular form, the Latin version is written in third person singular form. It is thus widely accepted that the chronicle constitutes an autobiography and can be attributed to James I; while the narrative belongs to no one but the king himself, this is not true of the text. Historical research has concluded that James' chronicle was written by different scholars in the form of oral dictation, recounting the life and most important deeds of James I. The narrative begins with his birth in 1208 and ends in the last years of his reign at an advanced stage of his life, around the year 1274. Among James' most remarkable deeds we find a highly detailed narration of the Muslim expulsion and conquest of Mallorca and Valencia.

The Chronicle of Bernat Desclot (Llibre del rei en Pere d'Aragó) In the Chronicle of Bernat Desclot, there is no date or event mentioned that would that give researchers an idea of the exact year of its writing. However, since Bernat mentions at the end of the chronicle the conquest of Sicily in 1283, historians have agreed that the text could have been produced towards the end of Bernat's life; between 1283 and 1286. This chronicle narrates the deeds and conquests of Catalonia and the Kingdom of Aragón during the Reconquista, from the crowning of Alfonso I until the reign of Peter the Great, who is always referred to as "Pere II" (Peter II) in the chronicle, following Catalan numbering. Bernat's main purpose appears to be the glorification of Pere II as king. One of the most remarkable aspects of this chronicle as a literary text is its detailed narration of medieval legends and troubadour tales. Bernat also describes in detail other singular aspects and values of the time such as the importance of the chivalric spirit, of loyalty among knights, and of the horrors of war.

The Chronicle of Ramon Muntaner (Llibre de Ramon Muntaner) Ramon Muntaner wrote the lengthiest of the four Catalan Chronicles. Muntaner was born in Peralada in 1256 and died in Mallorca in 1336. This chronicle dates from the same year in which he wrote his memoirs, 1325. Apart from being the lengthiest of the four texts, this chronicle also comprises a long period in history: from James I's birth in 1208 to the crowning of Alfonso III in 1328. Between 1208 and 1328, Ramon Muntaner gives special attention to the lives of the kings who ruled during his lifetime. Although Muntaner uses other information sources such as historiographical texts as well as epic narratives, most of his chronicle is based on his own thoughts and experiences regarding the events that take place in the narrative, lending this work credibility and making it an exceptionally complete historiographical document of medieval Europe.

The Chronicle of Peter IV (Llibre de Pere el Cerimoniós) The Chronicle of Peter IV was written in two parts. The first part between the years 1375 and 1383, and the second part in 1386. The text is written in first person singular, with authorship of the narrative being attributed to Peter IV of Aragon, who always calls himself "Pere Terç" (Peter III) in the chronicle, following Catalan numbering. The chronicle begins with the reign of Peter's father, Alfonso IV, and ends with the marriage of Peter's sons in 1370.

== Bibliography ==
- Aguilar Àvila, Josep Antoni. Introducció a Les Quatre Grans Cròniques. Barcelona, Rafael Dalmau, 2011.
- Comas Molas, Riquer Història de la literatura catalana( vol.1,2 i 3), Barcelona, Ariel, 1964-1966.
- Maria Cingolani, Stefano. La Memòria Dels Reis : Les Quatre Grans Cròniques i La Historiografia Catalana, Des Del Segle X Fins Al XIV. Barcelona Base, 2008.
