= Ramon Muntaner =

Catalan writer and soldier (1265–1336)

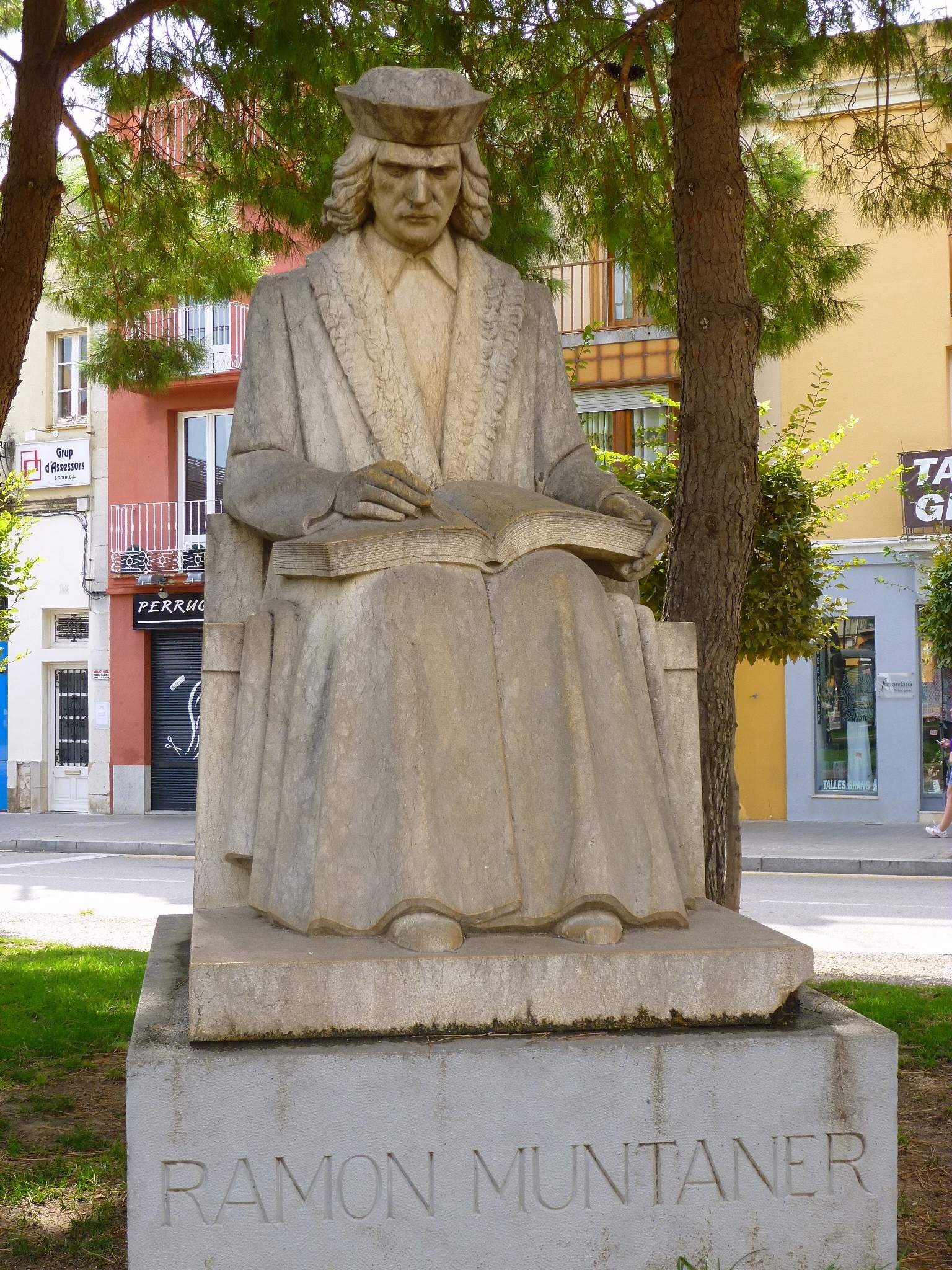
- Ernest Vila Plaza (Figueres)
- Born: 1265; Peralada, Catalonia
- Died: 1336 (aged 70–71); Ibiza, Crown of Aragon
- Writing career
- Genre: chronicle

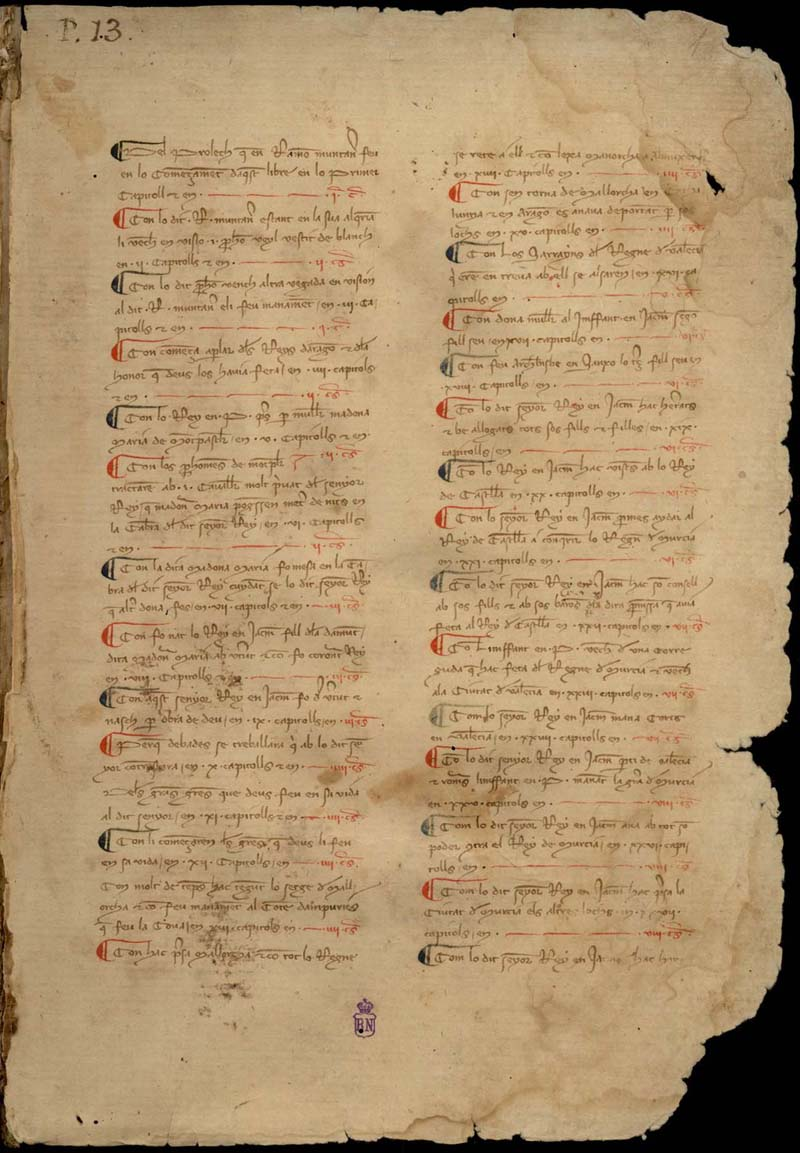
Manuscript of the Crònica by Ramon Muntaner.

Ramon Muntaner (Catalan pronunciation: [rəˈmom muntəˈne]) (1265 – 1336) was a Catalan mercenary and writer who wrote the Crònica, a chronicle of his life, including his adventures as a commander in the Catalan Company. He was born at Peralada.

== Biography ==
The Catalan Company was an army of light infantry under the leadership of Roger de Flor that was made up of Aragonese and Catalan mercenaries, known as Almogavars; Roger led the Company to Constantinople to help the Greeks against the Turks.

For a lapse of time (1308-1315) he was governor of Djerba after its conquest by the Crown of Aragon.

Ramon Muntaner's Crònica is one of the four Catalan Grand Chronicles through which the historian views thirteenth- and fourteenth century military and political matters in the Crown of Aragon and the Principality of Catalonia.

He died at Ibiza in 1336.
