= Planctus de obitu Karoli =

The Planctus (de obitu) Karoli ("Lament [on the Death] of Charlemagne"), also known by its incipit A solis ortu (usque ad occidua) ("From the rising of the sun [to the setting]"), is an anonymous medieval Latin planctus eulogising Charlemagne, written in accented verse by a monk of Bobbio shortly after his subject's death in 814. It is generally considered the earliest surviving planctus, though its melody is written in tenth-century neumes, one of the earliest surviving examples of this sort of musical notation. The poem has been translated into English by Peter Godman.

The authorship of the Planctus has been a matter of some dispute. Its author has been identified with Columbanus of Saint Trond, who, it is claimed, also wrote the Ad Fidolium, a set of quantitative adonics. The Planctus appeared in a seventeenth-century manuscript compilation of the poems of Hrabanus Maurus under the subscription "Hymnus Columbani ad Andream episcopum de obitu Caroli", which inspired L. A. Muratori to make the identification, but this late ascription to a Columbanus is probably deduced from the poem's own seventeenth stanza. As argued by Heinz Löwe, that stanza in fact makes it very difficult to argue that the poet, who consistently uses the first person, was the Columbanus he refers to.

The poem is composed of twenty three-line romance strophes each with a distich of two dodecasyllables and the parenthetical heptasyllabic refrain Heu mihi misero!, which does not mark a division in thought but is inserted regularly in an otherwise continuous syntax. Each dodecasyllable ends in a proparoxytone (mot métrique). The existence of quilisma in the musical notation indicates the influence of plainchant.

The first line (A solis ortu...) is drawn from a fifth-century hymn of Caelius Sedulius. As the Sedulian hymn was sung at Christmastime, the sorrowful Planctus presents a contrast with the joy typically associated with its opening. The poet expands upon his personal grief at the death of his emperor—and benefactor of Bobbio—by asking all the regions of Earth to mourn with him, and using the tears of Saint Columbanus, founder of Bobbio, as a symbol of the monastery's grief. The rhythm of the verse, presence of musical notation, and orientation towards contemporary events suggest popular recitation or performance. The poem, though associated with the Carolingian Renaissance in Latin letters, is not a commentary on the "disintegration" (or décomposition) of the Carolingian Empire after the death of Charlemagne.

== Select stanzas ==
The following text is taken from Peter Godman (1985), Latin Poetry of the Carolingian Renaissance (Norman: University of Oklahoma Press), 206–211.

I. A solis ortu usque ad occidua
littora maris planctus pulsat pectora.
Heu mihi misero!

II. Ultra marina agmina tristitia
tetigit ingens cum merore nimio.
Heu mihi misero!

III. Franci, Romani atque cuncti creduli
luctu punguntur et magna molestia.
Heu mihi misero!

IV. Infantes, senes, gloriosi praesules,
matronae plangunt detrimentum Caesaris.
Heu mihi misero!

V. Iamiam non cessant lacrimarum flumina,
nam plangit orbis interitum Karoli.
Heu mihi misero!
...

XVII. O Columbane, stringe tuas lacrimas,
precesque funde pro illo ad dominum—
Heu mihi misero!

XVIII. Pater cunctorum, misericors dominus,
ut illi donet locum splendidissimum!
Heu mihi misero!

XIX. O deus cunctae humanae militiae
atque caelorum, infernorum domine—
Heu mihi misero!

XX. In sancta sede cum tuis apostolis
suscipe pium, o tu Christe, Karolum!
Heu mihi misero!

1. From the rising of the sun to the sea-shores
where it sets, lamentation beats upon the hearts of men.
Alas for me in my misery!

2. Beyond the ocean-reaches men have been touched
by immense sadness and extreme sorrow.
Alas for me in my misery!

3. The Franks, the Romans and all believers
are tormented by grief and great distress.
Alas for me in my misery!

4. Children, old men, glorious bishops
and matrons lament the loss of the emperor.
Alas for me in my misery!

5. Rivers of tears are now endless,
for the world bewails the death of Charlemagne.
Alas for me in my misery!
...

17. O Columbanus, hold back your tears,
pour forth prayers on his behalf to the Lord—
Alas for me in my misery!

18. so that the father of all, lord of mercy,
may grant Charlemagne a place of great splendour!
Alas for me in my misery!

19. O God of the hosts of all mankind
and of the heavens, lord over hell—
Alas for me in my misery!

20. O Christ, receive into your holy dwelling
among your apostles the pious Charlemagne!
Alas for me in my misery!

The latest critical and only textual and musical edition can be found in Corpus Rhythmorum Musicum (saec. IV–IX), I, "Songs in non-liturgical sources [Canti di tradizione non liturgica]", 1 "Lyrics [Canzoni]" (Florence: SISMEL, 2007), edited by Francesco Stella (text) and Sam Barrett (music), with reproduction of the manuscript sources and recording of the audio executions of the modern musical transcriptions, now partially consultable here.
