= Joan Puig i Ferreter =

Spanish writer

- Joan Puig i Ferreter
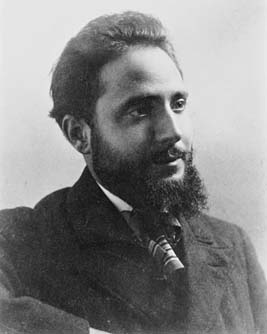
- Born: February 5, 1882; La Selva del Camp, Spain
- Died: February 2, 1956 (aged 73); Paris, France
- Occupation: Writer
- Notable work: Aigües encantades

Joan Puig i Ferreter (Catalan pronunciation: [ʒuˈam ˈpudʒ i fərəˈte]; 5 February 1882 – 2 February 1956) was a Catalan playwright and politician. His works include Aigües encantades ("Enchanted Waters"), which first appeared in 1908, and Camins de França ("Roads of France"), which was published in 1934 and is considered his prose masterpiece. He was a member of the Republican Left of Catalonia, whom he represented as a member of the Parliament of Catalonia during the Second Spanish Republic.
