= Planctus =

Medieval genre of lament

A planctus ("plaint") is a lament or dirge, a song or poem expressing grief or mourning. It became a popular literary form in the Middle Ages, when they were written in Latin and in the vernacular (e.g., the planh of the troubadours). The most common planctus is to mourn the death of a famous person, but a number of other varieties have been identified by Peter Dronke. The earliest known example, the Planctus de obitu Karoli, was composed around 814, on the death of Charlemagne.

Other planctus from the ninth century include vernacular laments in a woman's voice, Germanic songs of exile and journeying, and planctus on biblical or classical themes (like the Latin Planctus cygni, which is possibly derived from Germanic models). The earliest examples of music for planctus are found in tenth-century manuscripts associated with the Abbey of Saint Martial of Limoges. From the twelfth century Dronke identifies a growing number of laments of the Virgin Mary (called a planctus Mariae) and complaintes d'amour (complaints of love) in the courtly love tradition. From the mid-thirteenth century survives an early Catalan Marian lament, Augats, seyós qui credets Déu lo Payre, and around 1300 the Lamentations of Mary were composed in Old Hungarian. The Mongol invasion of Europe drew a planctus from an anonymous monk in the entourage of Béla IV of Hungary, the Planctus destructionis regni Hungariae per Tartaros (1242).

The term may have been the source of the Irish planxty, a song written in tribute to a person, although etymologies from Irish are also suggested.
