= Augats, seyós qui credets Déu lo Payre =

Catalan poem

Augats, seyós qui credets Déu lo Payre (Catalan pronunciation: [əwˈɣats səˈjos ˈki ˈkɾɛdədz ˈdew lu ˈpajɾə], sometimes called the Plany de la Verge) is a Catalan poem of lamentation (planctus) in the planctus Mariae tradition, in which the Virgin Mary laments the death of her son. It was written between 1240 and 1260 and is thus one of the oldest Catalan poems, although it comes two hundred years after the Cançó de Santa Fe. The piece is sometimes confused with the Plant de la Verge of Ramon Llull.

Structurally, Augats is divided into twelve stanzas, each composed of five monorhyming decasyllabic lines followed by tetrasyllabic single-line refrain and a final decasyllabic line without rhyme. The language of the poem is heavily influenced by the Occitan of the troubadours and the courtly love lyric.

The poem is preserved in four manuscripts. It was first brought to light by Jaime Villanueva in 1821, when he redacted it for publication from a manuscript in the archives of the church of Àger. Villanueva found it entitled Planctus Sanctae Mariae virginis. Its language (whether Occitan or Catalan) became at once an issue of debate. The first two lines of the second stanza are a direct translation of an earlier Latin lament, Qui per viam pergitis. The poem, which was perhaps performed, is the first-person lament of the Virgin Mary over the crucifixion of her son, Jesus Christ:

Cascuna·s pens, si sol un fyl avia, si auria dol, so penyar lo veya. Doncs jo, lasa, que·l Fyl de Déu noyria, si·n dey plorar uymays la nit e·l dia, Ben ha dur cor qui no m'a compaynia! Oy, bels Fyls cars! Mol m'és lo jorn dolorós e amars!	Everyone thinks, if she has only one son, how much sorrow she'd have if she saw him hanged. Therefore, I, unfortunate, would feed the Son of God, and cry day and night from now on, harder is the heart that has not accompanied me! O, beautiful, worthy Son! This day is most sorrowful and bitter to me!
