= Lo Bord del rei d'Arago =

Lo Bord del rei d'Arago (Occitan: [lu ˈβɔɾd del ˈrej ðaɾaˈɣu], Catalan: [lu ˈβoɾd dəl ˈrej ðəɾəˈɣo]), literally "The Bastard of the King of Aragon", is the name assigned to the composer of three coblas in an Occitan chansonnier. Lo Bord wrote two peticions (or cobles ab resposta, questions) and one remissio (resposta, response) to Rostanh Berenguier de Marselha, who also wrote a fourth peticion of his own to Lo bord, but without a surviving response. This poem without a response, Pos de sa mar man cavalier del Temple, contains internal clues permitting it to be dated to between 1291 and 1310. All these coblas were edited and published by Paul Meyer in Les derniers troubadours de la Provence (Paris, 1871).

The dates, the connexion through his interlocutor with Marseille, and the abundance of illegitimate issue with which he could be identified suggest that Lo bord was a son of James I of Aragon. Peter III of Aragon also had bastards: a premarital son by a woman named Maria, the lord of Sogorb Jaume Pere, and John. Anyone of these illegitimate children may have been the bastard-troubadour, but a definitive identification will likely always be elusive.

The poetry of the anonymous royal bastard and Rostanh Berenguier is "insignificant and banal" in the Goliardic tradition. It was copied anonymously into the Catalan-language Cançoner de Saragossa in the fifteenth century.
