= Bruno Stäblein =

German musicologist

Bruno Stäblein (5. May 1895 in Munich – 6. March 1978 in Erlangen) was a German musicologist. He was a professor of musicology at the University of Regensburg. The focus of his work was the exploration of medieval music, in particular the exploration of the Gregorian chant.

In 1957, he was a founding member of the Gesellschaft für Bayerische Musikgeschichte.

== Bibliography ==
- Martin Ruhnke (1967). Festschrift Bruno Stäblein zum 70. Geburtstag. Bärenreiter, Kassel.
