= Llibre dels fets =

Autobiographical chronicle of the reign of James I of Aragon

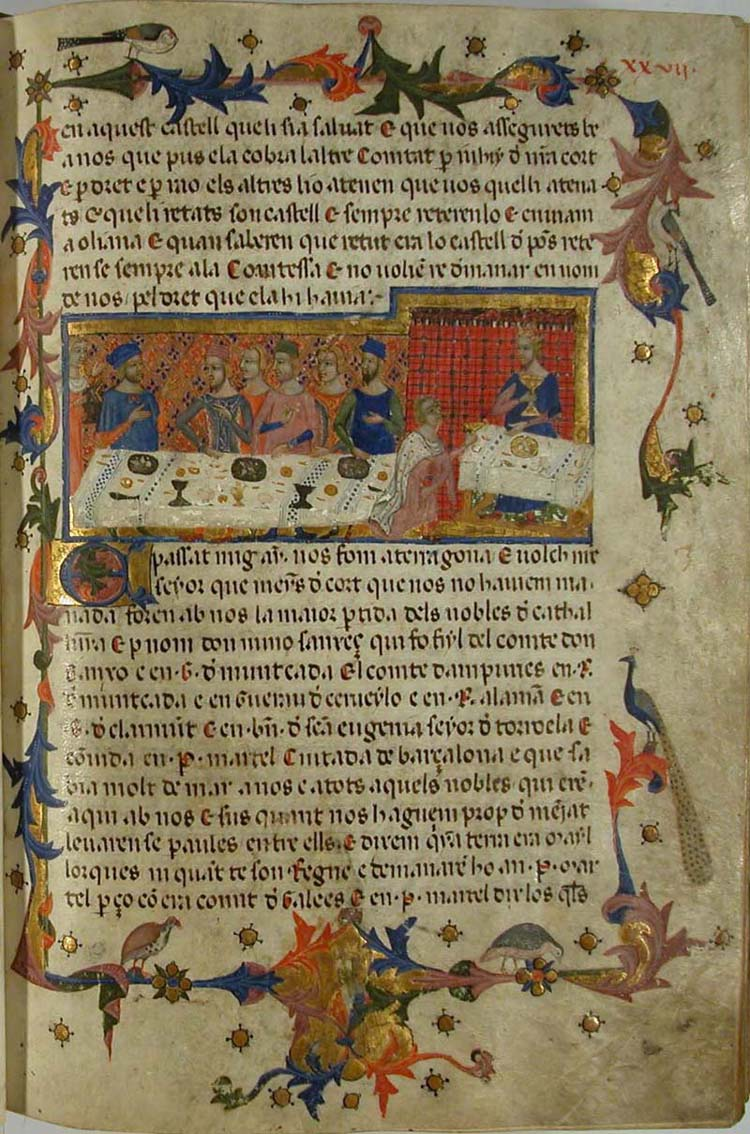
Fragment of the oldest existing copy of the Llibre dels Fets written in Old Catalan, dating from 1343. The scene depicts a supper in Tarragona, where James I of Aragon with his lords planned the conquest of Mallorca (1229) ruled by the Muslims (in the context of the Iberian Christian Reconquista)

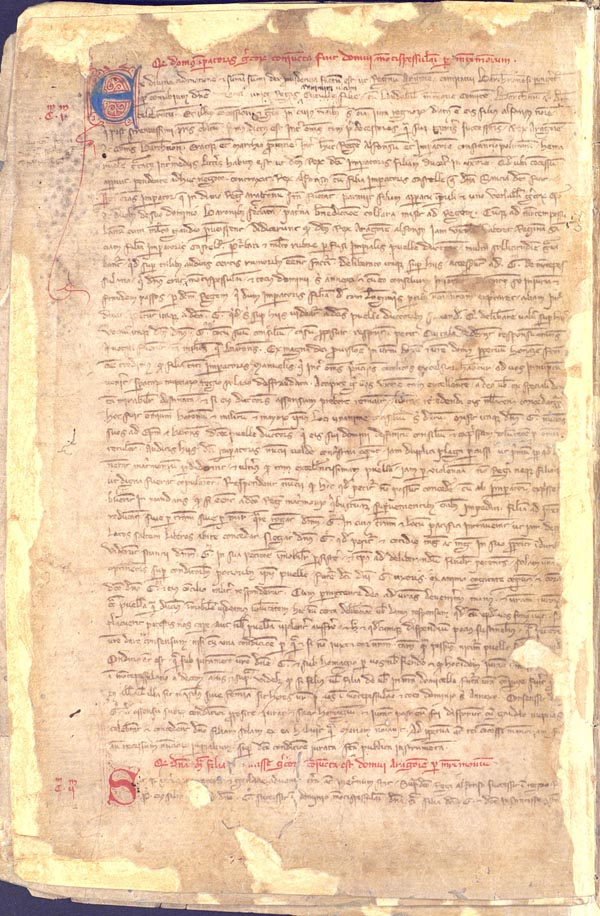
The 1313 Latin translation "Cronice Illustrissimi Regis Aragonum", possibly a copy from the original, translated by the Dominican friar Pere Marsili, by order of James II of Aragon, grandson of James I of Aragon, called "the Conqueror".

The Llibre dels fets (Catalan pronunciation: [ˈʎiβɾə ðəls ˈfets]; from Catalan, 'Book of Deeds'; Old Catalan: Libre dels feyts) is the autobiographical chronicle of the reign of James I of Aragon (1213–1276). It is written in Old Catalan in the first person and is the first (chronologically) of the four works classified as The Four Great Catalan Chronicles. The chronicles all belong to the early medieval Crown of Aragon (in the northeastern part of what is now Spain), and its first royal dynasty, the House of Barcelona.

== History of the writing ==
In the Llibre dels Fets, James I of Aragon describes his life and his most important actions beginning with his birth in 1203 and ending with his death in 1276.

Though the text of the Llibre dels fets was dictated and edited by James I, the actual writing was done by scribes, not James himself; it is written in colloquial language, representing the native tongue as spoken

The oldest extant manuscript dates to 1343 and was commissioned by the abbot of the Poblet Monastery. An older manuscript dating to 1313, the "Cronice Illustrissimi Regis Aragonum", was the version translated into Latin from the Catalan original "Llibre dels Feyts del Rei en Jacme."

The Latin translation is signed by the Dominican friar Pere Marsili, who was ordered by James II of Aragon (James I's grandson) to honour his grandfather's memory by promulgating his words in the internationally used Latin language.

== Structure ==
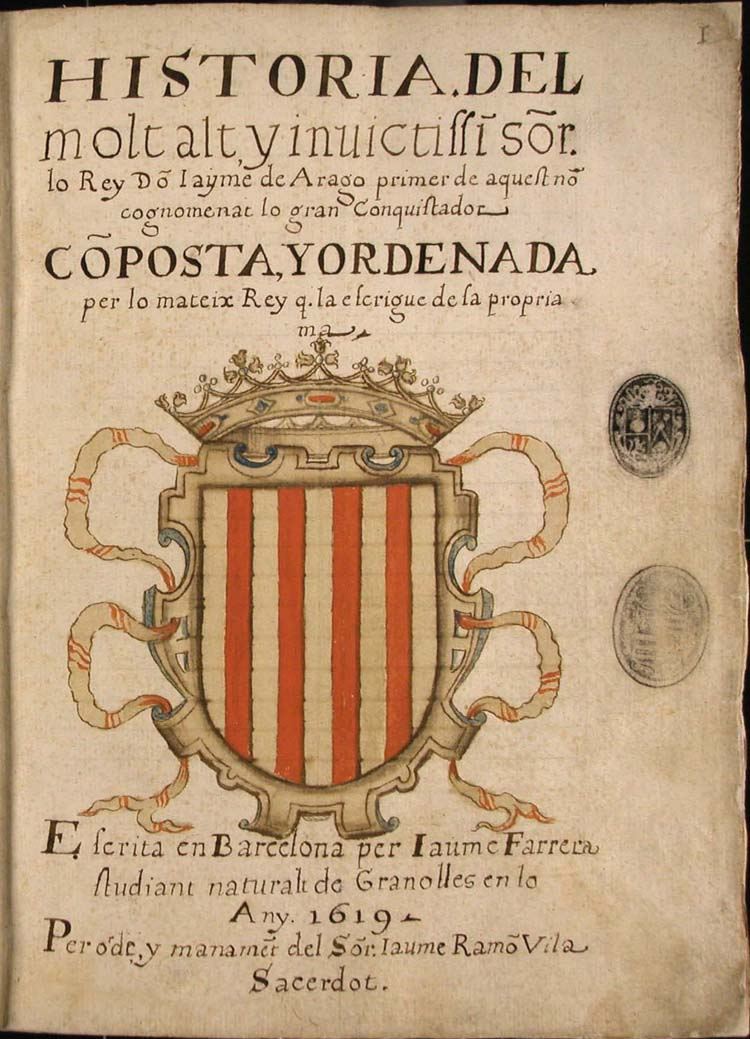
1619 Frontispiece of Catalan manuscript made by Jaume Ferrera

Other manuscripts have survived, all copies of the one made for the Poblet Monastery in 1343. As the title itself indicates, the Llibre dels fets is in fact a "Book of Deeds." Studies conducted in the 1980s concluded that this medieval manuscript is of an undefined literary style, since it was entirely orally dictated.

The internal structure of both versions seems to indicate two moments in time: the first part may have been dictated around 1240, shortly after James's conquest of Valencia. The facts before 1228 are explained briefly and contain significant errors. Afterwards, the narrative shows greater detail and precision.

The "second part" might have been dictated around 1274, and has a similar structure; the facts from 1242 to 1265 are condensed in a few pages, while the later years are again explained in great detail.

The prologue and the section that describes his illness and death were most likely written or dictated by someone in James's trust.

=== Content ===
The content of the Llibre dels fets can be divided into four parts:

The first part covers the period from 1208 to 1228. Several chapters are dedicated to James's ancestors and parents, his mother (Maria of Montpellier) and to his father (Peter II of Aragon "The Catholic"). It also covers James's unexpected birth, his captivity at the age of five (after his father's death), as well as Simon de Montfort's desire to marry him to his daughter (a failed plan that would have brought the De Montfort family into the Crown of Aragon). This portion concludes with James returning to Aragon, where the Knights Templar (a powerful military religious order within the medieval Crown of Aragon), guard and raise him at Monzon Castle (the Templars' main castle), and details his marriage to Eleanor of Castile.

The second part, which covers the period from 1229 to 1240, is the most detailed part of the Llibre dels fets, covering the conquest of Majorca (1229). This portion begins with the history of the Crown of Aragon. Shortly after comes the conquest of Valencia in 1238. The book tries to prove that King James accomplishments are divine providence.

The third part, which covers the period from 1240 to 1265, describes the conflicts with the Saracen rebels from Valencia.

The final part, covers the period from 1265 to 1276, and describes the battles against the Moors, the conquest of Murcia, and several political episodes that James uses to justify his actions. The last chapters, which explain the king's illness and death.

== Language and style ==
The Llibre dels fets is written in Old Catalan, in the first person, and in a colloquial style full of proverbs, expressions, and quotes from foreign personages speaking other languages such as Aragonese, Galician-Portuguese (used by the Crown of Castile), Arabic or Old French.

In the Latin translation of 1313 by Pere Marsili, the friar, informs his readers that he has translated chapters from the manuscripts then kept in the royal archives, indicating that the texts of the chronicles already existed and that they were written in the "vulgar language," i.e., not in Latin, but in Catalan.

== Codices and editions ==
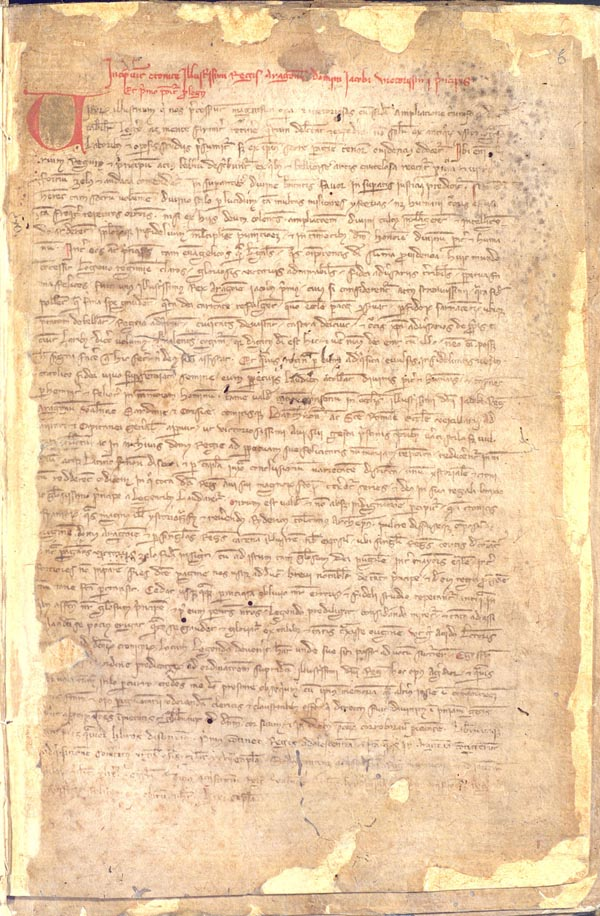
1313 Latin translation of the Llibre dels Fets, the Cronice Illustrissimi Regis Aragonum by Friar Pere Marsili following the order of James II of Aragon (grandson of James I of Aragon).

Five codices of the text from the 14th century and two from the 15th are preserved, all based on a translation of the original Catalan text into Latin by the Dominican friar Pere Marsili at the order of King James's grandson (his namesake James II of Aragon). Marsili intended to adapt the original text to contemporary manners and style noting:

[...] So that the deeds of His glorious grandfather (James I), collected in a truthful but vulgar style, shall be put to date and once translated to Latin, form a single History volume, a full chronicle in which all the actions of the king his grandfather (James I the Conqueror) will be woven together.

Marsili finished the royal assignment on 2 April 1313, and then petitioned the king that a copy of the manuscript be made for the Friars Preachers of Majorca, his homeland, to be used on the day of the "Feast of the Banner:"

[...] with the purpose of the last day of the year, the annual feast which commemorates the conquest of the city of Majorca, for God's glory and the eternally worshiping memory of his Luckiest Prince (James I), and so the friars who preach on this significative solemn date in front of the whole clergy and people, could rely to this book, and more firmly be informed of the truth of the facts.

The official delivery of the Cronice Illustrissimi Regis Aragonum domini Jacobi victorissimi principis was made on 2 June 1314 at the Church of the Friars Preachers (església dels frares predicadors) of Valencia.

Six official copies of the Latin translation by Pere Marsili exist. Four dating from the 14th century (conserved respectively in the National Library of Catalonia, the Archives of the Kingdom of Majorca, the Archives of the Cathedral of Palma de Mallorca and the University of Barcelona's Library). A copy from the 17th century is kept at the Archives of the Crown of Aragon and another from the 19th in the Real Academia de la Historia of Spain.

15th-century manuscript (Madrid, BNE 10121). This page concerns the crusade of 1269

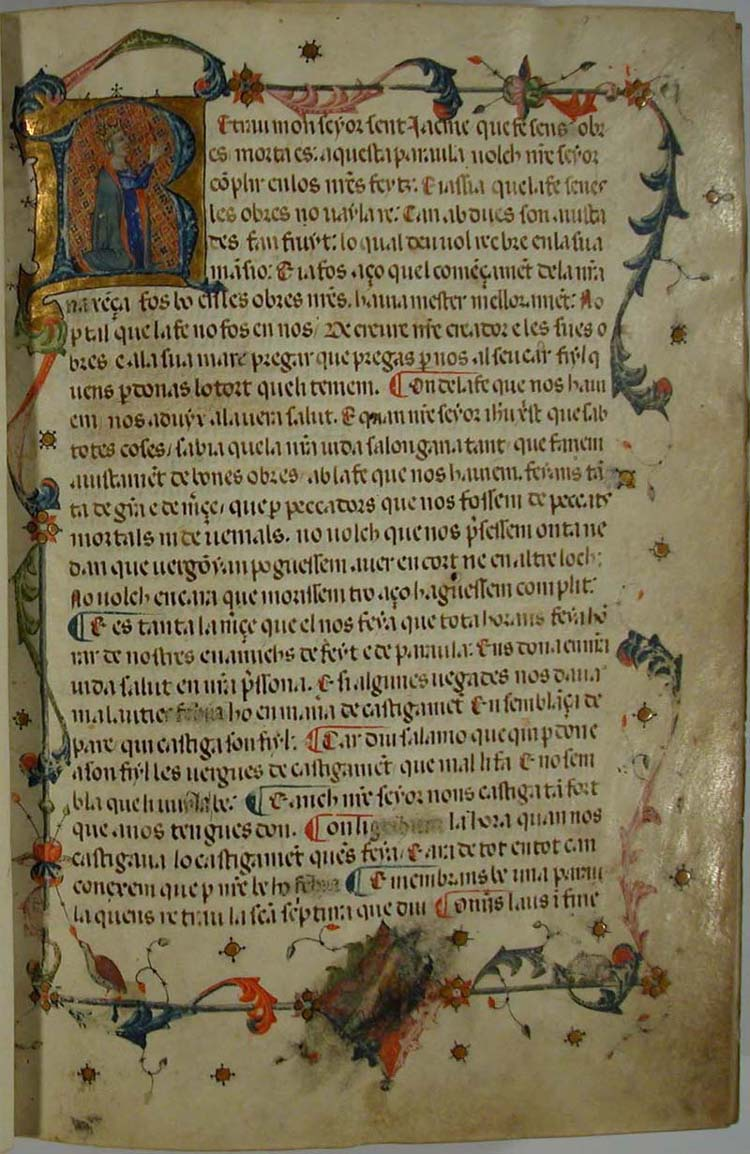
1343 Catalan manuscript Prologue

Dated to 1343, the oldest surviving codex in the original Catalan language is the copy ordered by Ponç de Copons, the abbot of the Poblet Monastery, as mentioned:

Aquest libre féu escriure l'onrat en Ponç de Copons, per la gràcia de Déu, abbat de l'honrat monestir de Sancta Maria de Poblet, en lo qual monestir jau lo molt alt senyor En Jaume, aqueyl que aquest libre parla, dels feyts que féu ni li endevengueren en la sua vida

[This book was ordered by the honorable Ponç de Copons, by God's grace, abbot of the St Maria Poblet Monastery, where there lies the most high Lord Sir James, the one about who the book tells, about the deeds and acts that he encountered in his lifetime). Friar Celestí des Torrents, who finished this manuscript on 17 September 1343.]

This copy from the Poblet Monastery was made from an original manuscript owned by the Royal Chancellery. On 11 November 1343, King Peter IV of Aragon sent a letter to the abbot of the Poblet Monastery demanding the return of the original codex In 1585 King Philip II of Spain visited the Poblet Monastery and ordered a copy of the chronicle for the Royal Library of San Lorenzo de El Escorial, Madrid.

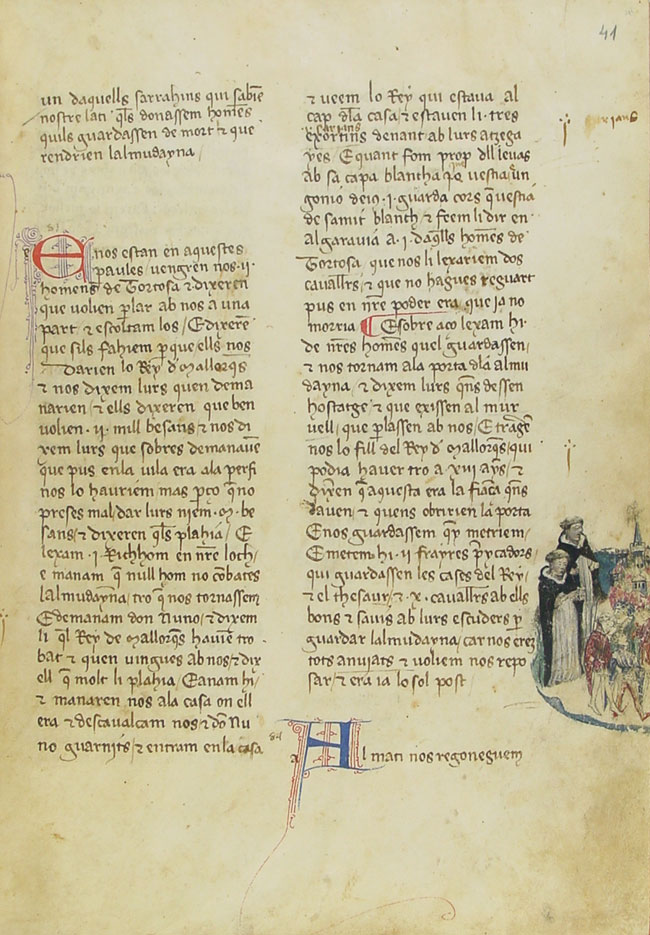
1380 Catalan copy contains two illustrations, both of friars; this first one depicts Dominican Friar Miguel Fabra i Berenguer de Castellbisbal.

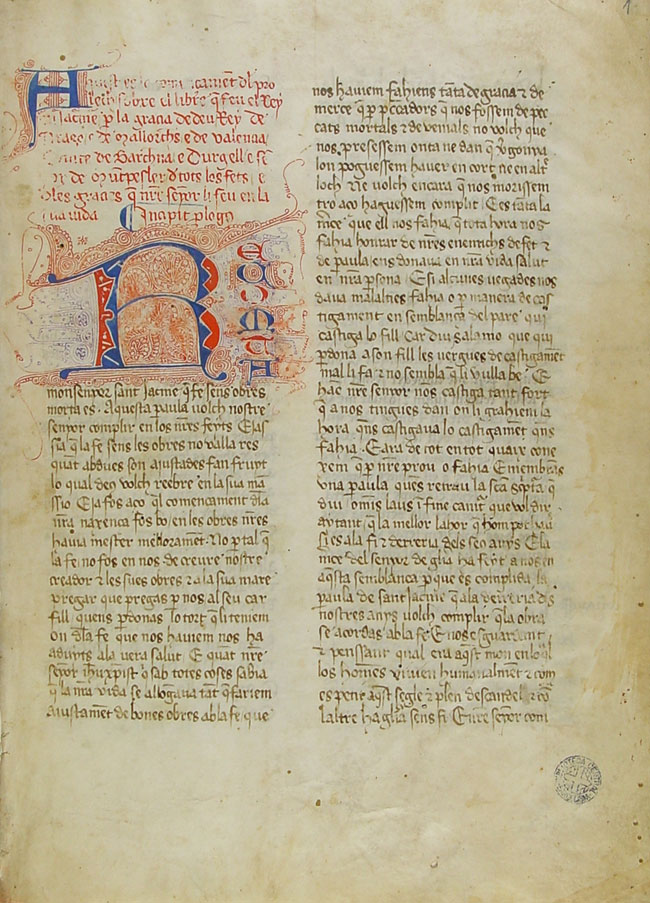
1380 Catalan manuscript first page: "...says My Lord Saint James that faith without actions, is dead. This word he wanted to accomplish, Lord, in our deeds..."

The second Catalan codex manuscript source, dating to 1380, comes directly from the Royal Chancellery of King Peter IV of Aragon, and must be a direct copy of the original, as the king himself commanded Johan de Barbastro to make it. The text in Latin:

Mandato serenissimi domini petri dei gratir regis Aragonum valentiae, Majoricarum, cardinieae et Corsicae, Comitisque Barchinonae, Rossilionis et Ceritaniae [...] Ego Iohannes de Barbastro de scribania predicti domini Regis Aragonum, oriundus Cesaraugustae scripsi Ciuitate Barchinonae Anno a Nativitate Dmi. Mo. CCCo. octuagesimo sripsi

[By order of Peter, by God's Grace King of Aragon, Valencia, Majorca, Sardinia and Corsica, Count of Barcelona, Roussillon and Cerdanya [...] I Johan de Barbastro, scribe chosen by the King of Aragon [...] in the City of Barcelona, year of The Lord's Nativity, 1380]

Its prologue, in Catalan, reads:

Aquest es lo començament del prolech sobre el libre que feu el rey en Jacme per la gracia de Deu rey de Arago e de Mallorches e de Valencia, comte de Barchinona e d'Urgell e senyor de Muntpesler de tots los fets e de les gracies que Nostre Senyor li féu en la sua vida

[This is the beginning of the prologue about the book that King James made, by Holy Grace, King of Aragon, of Majorca and Valencia, Count of Barcelona and Count of Urgell, and Lord of Montpellier, of all his deeds and gifts our Lord gave to him in his lifetime.]

A relevant fact about this copy is that Johan de Barbastro used an official codex from the Royal Chancellerie (now disappeared). King Pere IV ("the Ceremonious") ordered three copies: one for Majorca, one for Barcelona and another for Valencia. Only the Majorcan copy has survived, and is now preserved in the National Library of Catalonia.

This first printed edition was ordered and paid for by the Jury of the city of Valencia in 1557. Made in a period of historical inquiries, once the print was finished, a copy was sent to Madrid to King Philip II of Spain (known by the Catalans as Philip II of Castile) from the House of Habsburg, who had also been very interested in the manuscript codex kept in the Poblet Monastery.

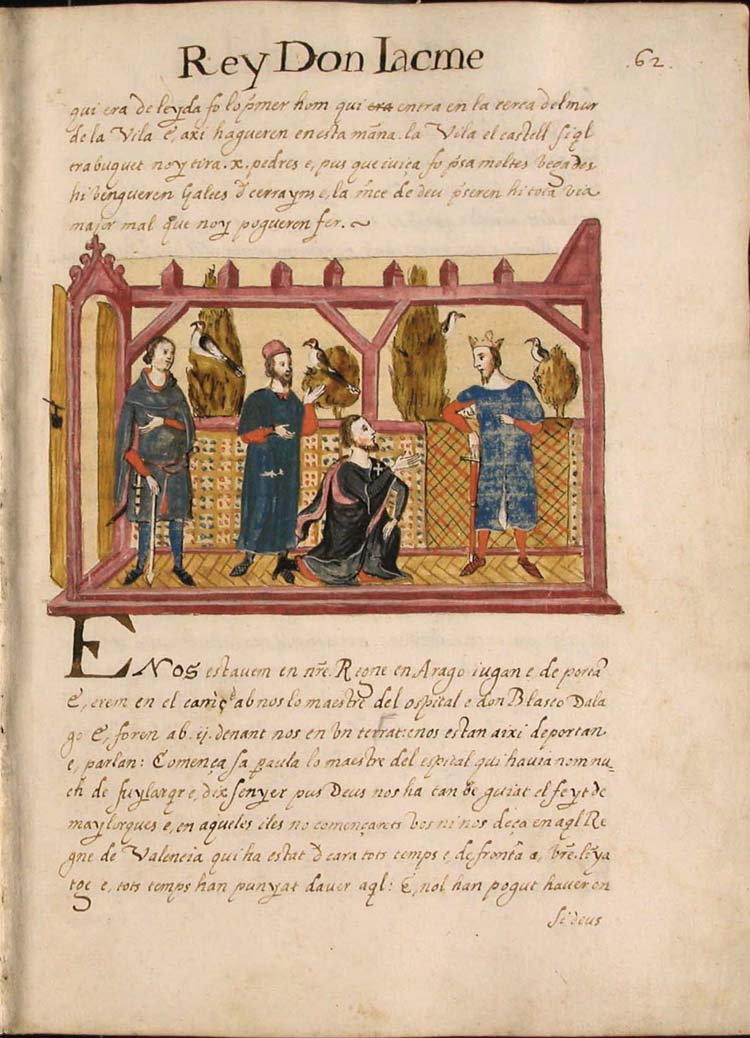
1619 Catalan copy from Jaume Ferrera of the Poblet Monastery's manuscript. This faithful depiction is the second and last of the book, and has disappeared in the other copies.

Other manuscripts have survived, all copies of the one made for the Poblet Monastery in 1343. There is one relevant codex between them conserved in the library of the University of Barcelona made by student Jaume Ferrera by order of his master, Prior Jaume Ramon Vila, who added a prologue, which is its singular feature. The Prior explains the reason he ordered the present copy of the Llibre dels fets, was "to deny the forgery issues that Castilian historians were throwing at Catalans". The other relevant feature of this codex is the second original illustration that did not survive from the Poblet manuscript. In this picture the Mayor of the Palace, Hugh de Forcalquier, and Blasco de Alagón are kneeling before James I.
