= Bernard Desclot =

Catalan chronicler

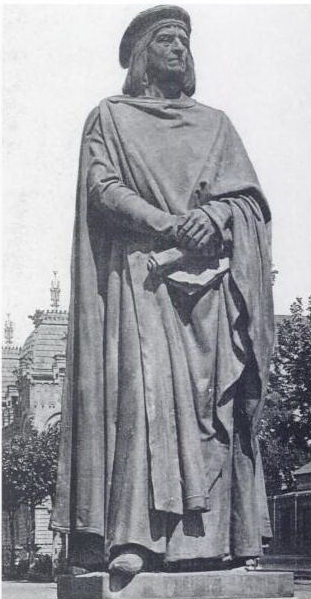
- The Bernard Desclot monument which was built in 1888 and was destroyed in 1937. The photograph was taken in 1910
- Born: c. 1288
- Died: 13...
- Writing career
- Language: Catalan language
- Genre: Chronicler

Bernard Desclot (in Catalan: Bernat Desclot) was a Catalan chronicler whose work covering the brief reign of Peter III of Aragon (1276–1285) forms one of the four Catalan Grand Chronicles through which the modern historian views thirteenth- and fourteenth century military and political matters in the Kingdom of Aragon and the Principality of Catalonia, including the "Aragonese Crusade". Desclot's Chronicle begins in the eleventh century but gains especial interest when he comes to describe events current within living memory. Bernard's literary model was Romance, and his account is spiced with dramatic monologues of the central characters and thrilling episodes, such as the escape of Peter's brother, James II of Majorca, from the fortress of Perpignan, through the castle's drains.

Nothing of Bernard himself is known save what little can be gleaned through his Chronicle.

F.L. Critchlow provided an English translation of the section covering the reign of Peter III in Chronicle of the Reign of King Peter III of Aragon, 1276-85 (Princeton University Press) 1928.

== Gallery ==
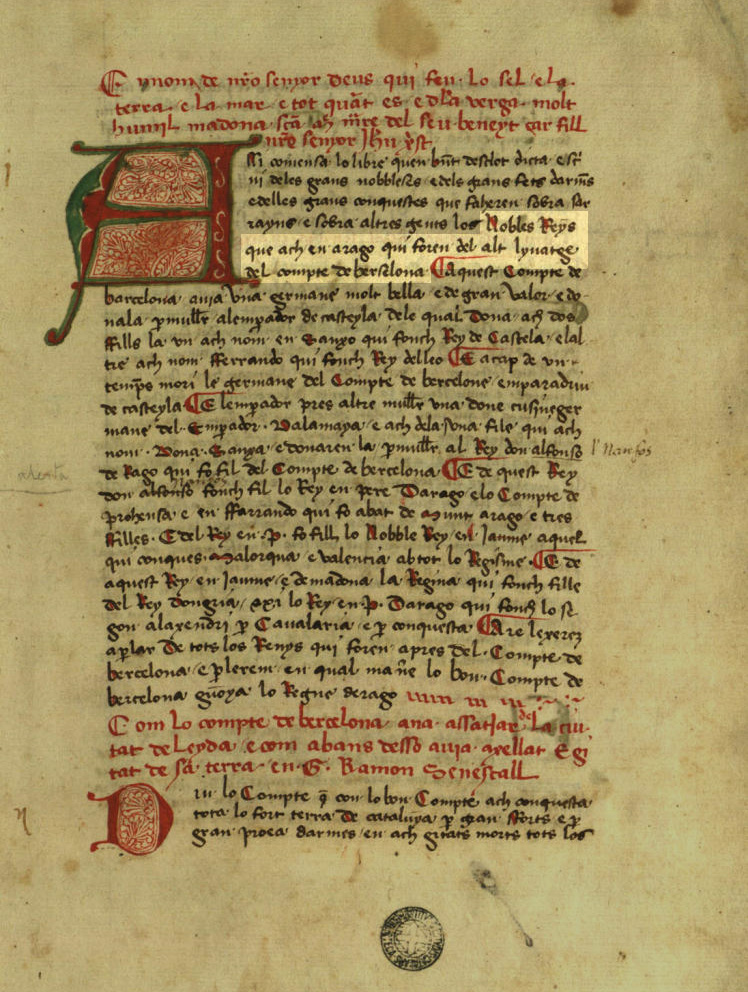

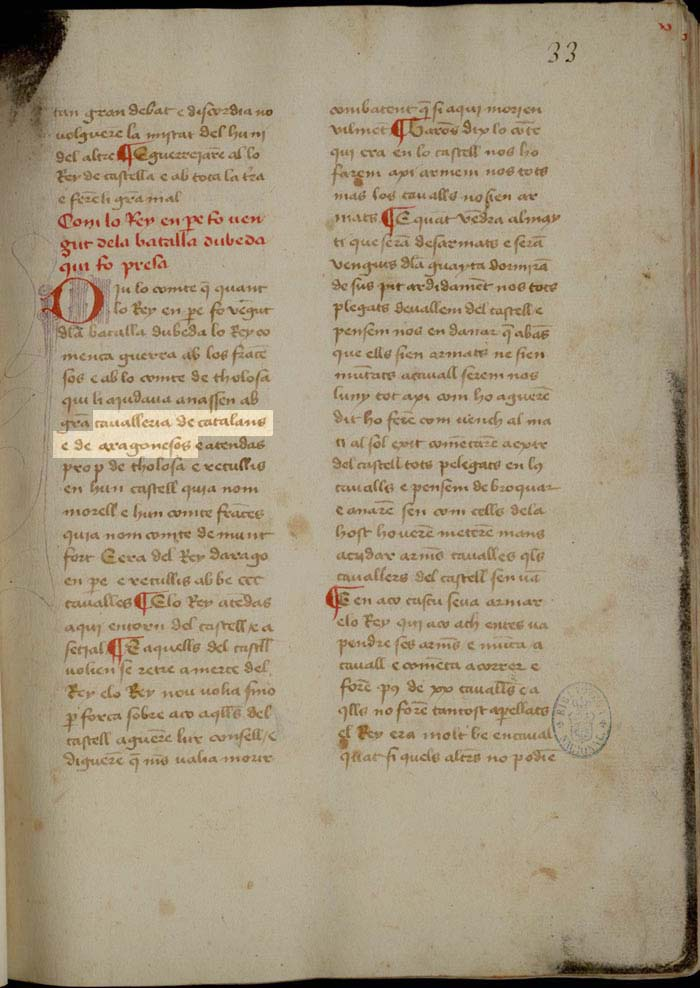

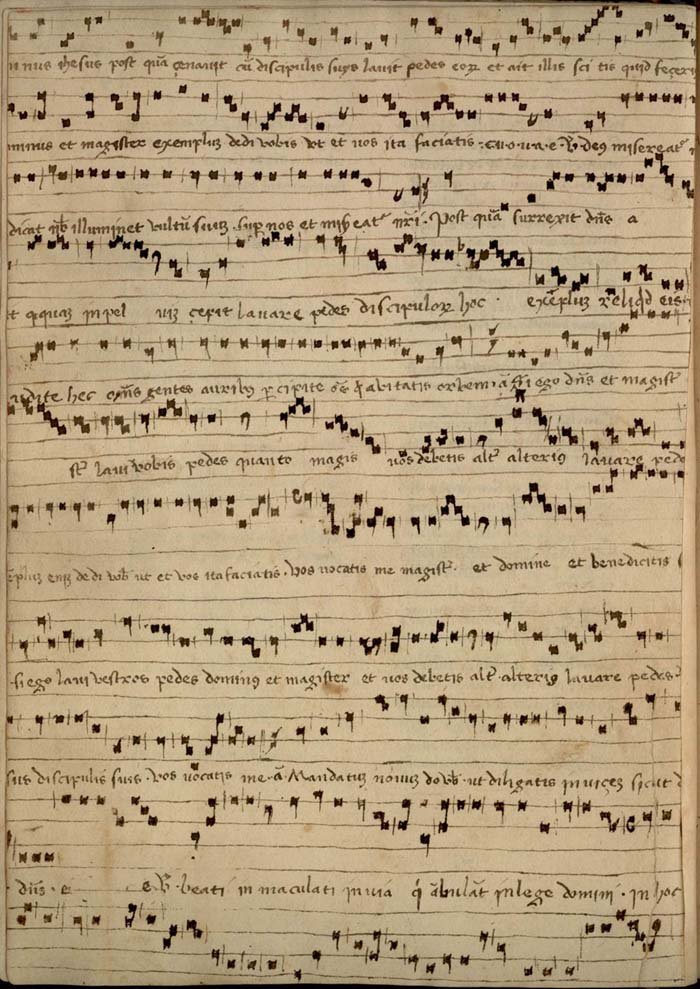

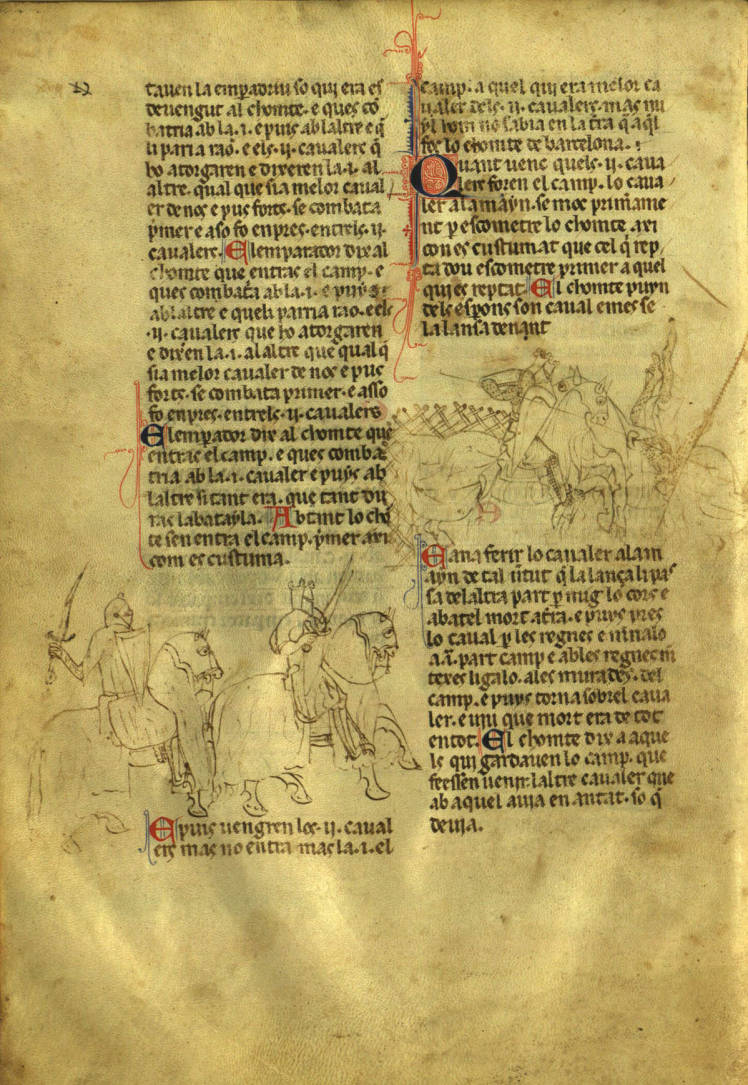
Page of Bernard's chronicle (Ms.486 Bib.de Catalunya, Barcelona)
