= Pere Marsili =

Mallorcan friar and diplomat

Pere Marsili (also known as Peter Marsili) was a Dominican friar, chronicler, translator, and royal ambassador during the 13th and 14th centuries. In 1314 King James II of Aragon ordered him to make a Latin adaptation of the autobiography of James I of Aragon, the Llibre dels feyts. The Catalan language original famously recounted the heroics of James I, known as the "Conqueror," and was a project in which the King himself had reputedly been involved. Marsili completed the four-part work in 1322 and titled it Commentarioum de gestis Regis Jacobi primi or Commentary on the Deeds of King James I (at times called the Liber gestorum or Book of Deeds, in reference to the original). Some historians believe he may also have written other extant works traditionally ascribed to a Pere Martell.

== Editions ==
- A. Biosca i Bas (ed.), Petrus Marsilii. Opera Omnia: Chronice illustrissimi regis Aragonum domini Iacobi uictorissimi principis, una cum Littera cuidam apostate Ordinis Fratrum Minorum, prius uocato frater Andreas, postea uero, factus Sarracenus, uocabatur Abdalla (= Corpus Christianorum. Continuatio Mediaevalis 273), Turnhout: Brepols Publishers, 2015 (ISBN 978-2-503-55218-7)
