= Seven Joys of the Virgin =

Popular devotion to Mary, Mother of Jesus Christ

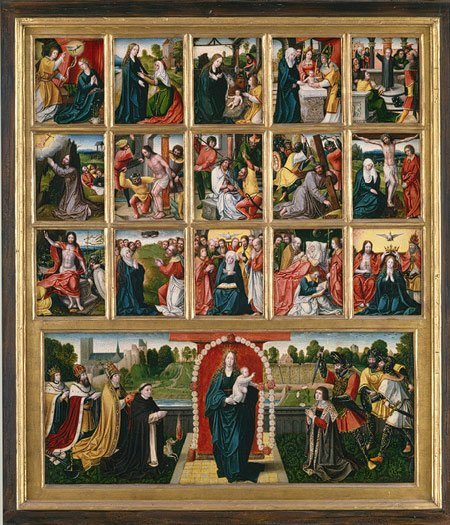
The Fifteen Mysteries of the Rosary and the Virgin of the Rosary

The Seven Joys of the Virgin (or of Mary, the Mother of Jesus) is a popular devotion to events of the life of the Virgin Mary, arising from a trope of medieval devotional literature and art.

The Seven Joys were frequently depicted in medieval devotional literature and art. The seven joys are usually listed as:

1. The Annunciation
2. The Nativity of Jesus
3. The Adoration of the Magi
4. The Resurrection of Christ
5. The Ascension of Christ to Heaven
6. The Pentecost or Descent of the Holy Spirit upon the Apostles and Mary
7. The Coronation of the Virgin in Heaven

Alternative choices were made and might include the Visitation and the Finding in the Temple, as in the Seven Joyful Mysteries of the Life of the Ever-Blessed Virgin from St. Vincent's Manual, or the Franciscan Crown form of Rosary, which uses the Seven Joys, but omits the Ascension and Pentecost. Depiction in art of the Assumption of Mary may replace or be combined with the Coronation, especially from the 15th century onwards; by the 17th century it is the norm. As with other sets of scenes, the different practical implications of depictions in different media such as painting, ivory miniature carving, liturgical drama and music led to different conventions by medium, as well as other factors such as geography and the influence of different religious orders. There is a matching set of seven Sorrows of the Virgin; both sets influenced the selection of scenes in depictions of the Life of the Virgin.

Originally, there were five joys of the Virgin. Later, that number increased to seven, nine, and even fifteen in medieval literature, although seven remained the most common number, and others are rarely found in art. The five joys of Mary are mentioned in the 14th-century poem Sir Gawain and the Green Knight as a source of Gawain's strength. The devotion was especially popular in pre-Reformation England. The French writer Antoine de la Sale completed a satire called Les Quinze Joies de mariage ("The Fifteen Joys of Marriage") in about 1462, which partly parodied the form of Les Quinze Joies de Notre Dame ("The Fifteen Joys of Our Lady"), a popular litany.

== The Seven Joys of Our Blessed Lady in Heaven ==
According to Pelbartus Ladislaus of Temesvár, St. Thomas, while he was reciting his daily 'Hail Mary's in memory of the principal joys of Mary, was "favored with an apparition of the Queen of Heaven." She encouraged him to add seven more 'Hail Mary's in honor of "the seven signal joys she possesses in heaven, and to instill the same devotion into the minds of others."

This devotion of the Seven Joys of Our Blessed Lady in Heaven recounts the glories Mary was honored with in heaven after her dormition.

== See also ==
- Franciscan Crown - rosary commemorating the seven joys of Mary
- Life of Jesus in the New Testament
- The Seven Joys of Mary (carol) - traditional carol
- Seven Sorrows of Mary
