= Curial e Güelfa =

15th-century Catalan chivalric romance

The start of the third book in the only manuscript copy includes one of two decorated initials actually finished.

Curial e Güelfa is an anonymous Catalan chivalric romance of the fifteenth century, notable for incorporating elements of Italian humanism. Known from a single manuscript and unpublished until the twentieth century, it is today considered a highly original masterpiece.

The romance is set in the late thirteenth century. Curial and Güelfa, the title characters, are a knight and his lady. Curial travels widely, performing deeds of chivalry, but a rift opens between him and Güelfa. During further travels, he is shipwrecked and enslaved in a pagan land. He escapes with a fortune and, after defeating the pagans, is reunited with Güelfa.

== Date, place and authorship ==
Curial was probably written in the period 1443–1448 or thereabouts. Since it refers to the Hospitaller langue of Spain, it was probably completed before 1462, when that langue was divided between Aragon and Castile. It is written in the Valencian dialect of Catalan, which was then the prestige dialect, since Alfonso the Magnanimous, king of Aragon, had made Valencia his chief residence prior to 1432. The author appears to have knowledge of Italian and Castilian. The text was probably written in Italy.

There have been many attempts to identify the author with known historical persons. Antoni Ferrando Francés suggests that he was Joan Olzina, Alfonso's secretary. Maria Teresa Ferrer i Mallol suggests Lluís Sescases, Alfonso's librarian. Most recently, Abel Soler has suggested Íñigo Dávalos, a Castilian who served Alfonso in Valencia and Italy. There is no scholarly consensus in favour of any of these proposals.

It has been suggested that the work is a translation from Italian. Although this is not accepted, the essentially Italian character of the work is generally acknowledged. It has also been suggested, on the basis of its uniqueness, that Curial is a 19th-century forgery of Manuel Milà i Fontanals. The text is generally accepted as authentic today. The physical attributes of the manuscript (ink, paper, binding) are characteristic of the 15th century.

== Textual history ==
First page of the manuscript, showing spaces for initials never drawn

Only a single manuscript of Curial e Güelfa is known. It is now MS 9750 in the Spanish National Library in Madrid. It was ignored or forgotten until rediscovered by Manuel Milà i Fontanals in 1876. The first edition appeared in print in 1901.

The work bears no date, title or dedication, since the first quire of the manuscript is missing. The romance itself is complete, although a few blank spaces suggest it was copied from an incomplete draft version. It is not the autograph. As it stands, it contains 224 folios (448 pages) of watermarked paper. The binding is in the Mudéjar style with iron clasps, typical of Castile. The handwriting is of Catalan notarial style. The manuscript was probably made by an Aragonese- or Castilian-speaking scribe.

There have been two English translations. There are also translations into Spanish, French, Portuguese, Italian and German.

== Synopsis ==
Curial e Güelfa is a conventional title, reflecting the names of its two main characters. It was coined, in the Spanish form Curial y Güelfa, by Antoni Rubió i Lluch, the editor of the 1901 edition. Curial is a poor knight and a vassal of the marquis of Montferrat. Güelfa is the sister of the marquis and a widow of the duke of Milan.

The action in Curial e Güelfa takes place in Italy, Germany, Hungary, France, England, Greece, the Holy Land, Egypt and Tunisia. It refers to Catalonia, but not to Valencia. It is set during the reign of King Peter III of Aragon (1276–1285). While its "sentimental framework" is Italian, its cultural framework is French. The deeds of chivalry mostly take place in France.

Curial is divided into three books. Each has a prologue and is subdivided into chapters. The chapters lack headings. In the manuscript, spaces have been left for the addition of initials at the start of each chapter, but these were never done.

In the assessment of Martí de Riquer, Curial is "a strikingly original work, written with skill, an excellent style, and a good narrative sense."

=== First book ===
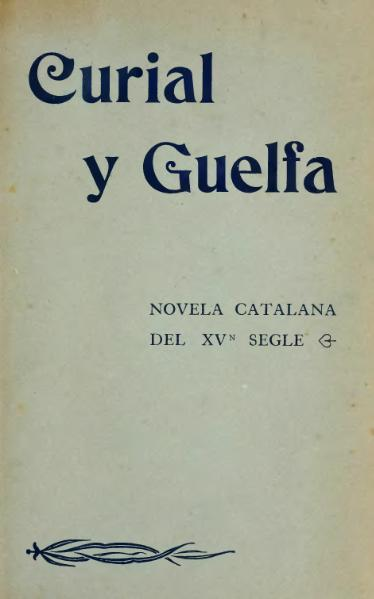
Title page of the first edition (1901)

In the first book, Curial convinces Güelfa to take him under her protection. She appoints her majordomo, Melchior de Pandó, to tutor him. As a result of rumours about his relationship with Güelfa spread by two jealous courtiers, Curial is banished from court by the marquis.

Curial and Jacob of Cleves learn that the duchess of Austria has been falsely accused of adultery. They travel to Austria, where Curial defeats the knights who had made the false accusation. The duchess's father, the duke of Bavaria, offers the hand in marriage of his other daughter, the beautiful Laquesis. Although Curial falls in love with her, he refuses her hand. When Güelfa learns of the marriage proposal, she becomes extremely jealous. Curial returns to Montferrat, where, with the help of three Catalan knights, he defeats the Neapolitan knight Boca de Far in a tournament held by the marquis.

=== Second book ===
In the second book, Curial goes to attend a tournament held by the king of France in Melun. He is accompanied by Güelfa's maid Arta (calling herself Festa). Along the way, he engages in many acts of knight errantry and joins four Aragonese knights.

At Melun, he fights for Güelfa. He takes the side of the Aragonese and Burgundians against the French and Bretons. King Peter of Aragon fights incognito. Curial defeats every foe in the presence of Laquesis. Afterwards, Güelfa orders him to remain in Paris, where he defeats the knight called the "Boar of Vilahir".

Curial eventually returns to Montferrat to clear his name from certain slander, but Güelfa renounces her protection of him until the French court meeting at Le Puy intervenes on his behalf.

=== Third book ===
In the third book, Curial wanders throughout the Holy Land and Greece. At Saint Catherine's Monastery in Sinai, he meets the reformed Boar of Vilahir, now a Franciscan.

In a dream, he visits Mount Parnassus, where the Muses ask him "whether Achilles' defeat of Hector in the Trojan War was in accord with the laws of chivalry." On his return voyage, he is shipwrecked in Tunisia. There he is forced to work seven years as a slave for Fàraig, whose daughter Càmar falls in love with him. He refuses her and she commits suicide, leaving him a large treasure she stole from her father. Through the intervention of the Aragonese ambassador, Curial is freed.

Curial returns to Montferrat in disguise, but Güelfa recognized him when he sings the "elephant song". Still she will not take him back. He goes to the French court, is heavily rewarded and falls into luxury and debauchery. He then raises and army to fight the Turks and rescues Güelfa's brother in battle. He is restored to the marquis's favour and is rewarded by the emperor of Constantinople.

Finally, Curial attends a tournament before the French court at Le Puy. The court intercedes for him and Güelfa takes him back. The two are wed.

== Source material and influences ==
The plot of Curial is taken from novella 61 of the vernacular Italian Cento novelle antiche of the 13th century.

In its realism, Curial has some resemblance to contemporary French chivalric narratives, such as Livre des faits du bon messire Jehan le Maingre, dit Boucicaut and Livre des faits de Jacques de Lalaing. The basic plot is similar to that of Le Petit Jehan de Saintré, a contemporary romance by Antoine de la Salle. Most of its identifiable sources, however are Italian. It draws heavily on the works of the early Italian humanists: Dante, Petrarch and Boccaccio. Boccaccio's Filocolo and Benvenuto da Imola's commentary on Dante's Divine Comedy have been identified as models. It also draws on the Matter of Britain.

The author of Curial was familiar with the story of Paris e Viana, a copy of which was catalogued in the royal library in Valencia in 1417.

The song which Curial composes for Güelfa upon his return from Tunisia is Atressi com l'aurifany, in fact composed by Rigaut de Berbezilh.

There are also classical borrowings. The role of Càman is that of Dido lifted from Virgil's Aeneid. The Mythologiae of Fulgentius is cited in the preface to the third book. The name of Laquesis is that of Lachesis from Plato's Republic, the Latin translation of Manuel Chrysoloras and Uberto Decembrio having reached Naples in 1440.

Curial's description of the chivalrous King Peter matches that in the chronicle of Bernat Desclot. The names of two characters appear to be based on real figures of 15th-century Naples: Melcior de Pando being based on the Pandone counts of Venafro, Boca de Far on the knight Bucca di Faro. Abel Soler argues that the echoes of the chronicles of Desclot and Ramon Muntaner were mediated by Italian historiography and are not reflective of the author's direct acquaintance.

== Bibliography ==
- Badia, Lola (2003). "Curial e Güelfa". In E. Michael Gerli (ed.). Medieval Iberia: An Encyclopedia. Routledge. p. 273.
- Badia, Lola (2017). "Writers at the End of Middle Ages". In Flocel Sabaté (ed.). The Crown of Aragon: A Singular Mediterranean Empire. Brill. pp. 387–410.
- Compte, Deborah (1993). "Curial y Güelfa". In Germán Bleiberg; Maureen Ihrie; Janet Pérez (eds.). Dictionary of the Literature of the Iberian Peninsula. Vol. 1: A–K. Greenwood Press. p. 481.
- Ferrando Francés, Antoni; Babbi, Anna Maria (2021). "Curial e Güelfa, a Forerunner of the Italian 'Humanistic Chivalry'". In Antoni Ferrando Francés; Anna Maria Babbi (eds.). La "cavalleria umanistica" italiana: Enyego (Inico) d'Avalos e 'Curial e Guelfa' [The Italian “Humanistic Chivalry": Enyego (Inico) d'Avalos and 'Curial e Guelfa']. John Benjamins Publishing Company. pp. ix–xv.
- Ferrando Francés, Antoni (2012). "Introduction". In Antoni Ferrando Francés (ed.). Estudis lingüístics i culturals sobre Curial e Güelfa, novel·la cavalleresca anònima del segle XV en llengue catalana [Linguistic and Cultural Studies on 'Curial e Güelfa': A 15th Century Anonymous Chivalric Romance in Catalan]. Vol. 1. John Benjamins Publishing Company. pp. xvii–xxi.
- Navarro Durán, Rosa (2016). "The Gothic Novel Curial e Güelfa: An Erudite Creation by Milà i Fontanals". Imago Temporis: Medium Aevum. 10: 53–94.
- Soler Molina, Abel (2017). "Enyego d'Àvalos, autor de Curial e Güelfa?". Estudis Romànics. 39 (39): 137–165. doi:10.2436/20.2500.01.218.
- Soler Molina, Abel (2018). "Curial e Güelfa, an Italian–Catalan Romance from the 15th Century Lacking 'Anomalies' and 'Mysteries'" (PDF). Imago Temporis: Medium Aevum. 12: 91–126.
- Soler Molina, Abel (2020). "Enyego d'Àvalos, el Curial, Homero, Santillana y la recepción del humanismo en Castilla" (PDF). EHumanista: Journal of Iberian Studies. 44: 109–136.
- Torró, Jaume; Badia, Lola (2017). "A Report on the Hypothesis of Attribution of Curial e Güelfa to Íñigo d'Ávalos" (PDF). Narpan.
- Waley, Pamela, ed. (1982). Curial and Guelfa. Allen and Unwin.
- Wheeler, John W., ed. (2011). Curial and Guelfa: A Classic of the Crown of Aragon. John Benjamins Publishing Company.
