= Antoni Rubió i Lluch =

Spanish historian, Catalan patriot and intellectual

Antoni Rubió i Lluch (Spanish: Antonio Rubió y Lluch; Valladolid 1856 – Barcelona 1937) was a Spanish historian and intellectual, and a Catalan patriot influenced by the Catalan Renaissance. A Hellenist and a medievalist, he left his mark on the study of the Catalan presence in fourteenth-century Greece.

== Biography ==
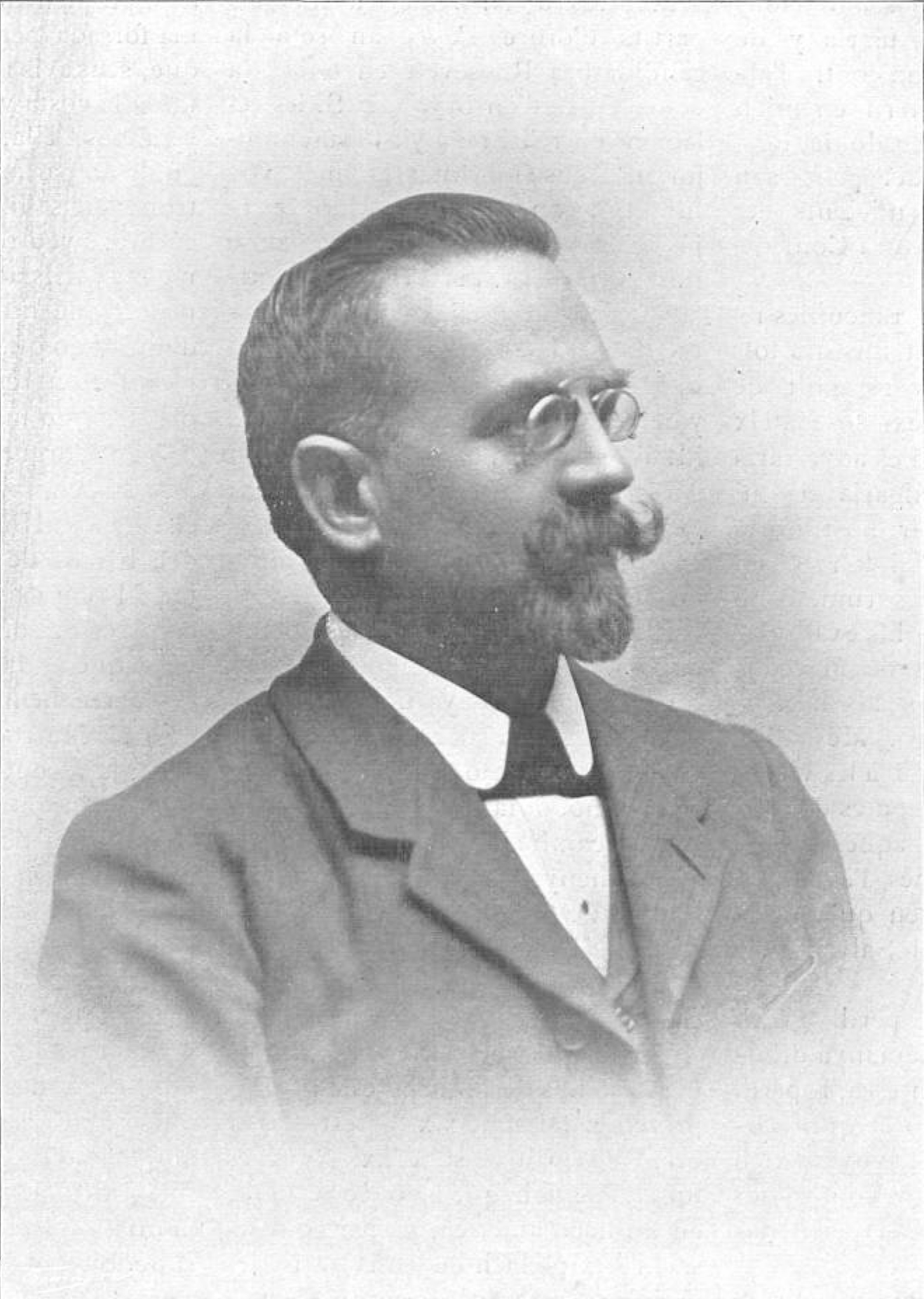
Antoni Rubió i Lluch

Son of the poet Joaquim Rubió i Ors, Rubió y Lluch studied philosophy and literature at the University of Barcelona under Manuel Milà i Fontanals and Francesc Xavier Llorens i Barba and in the company of Marcelino Menéndez Pelayo, who was a longtime friend and colleague. The two are icons of Catalan positivism. In 1880 he became a tutor in the literature faculty there and in 1885 a full professor of general literature at the University of Oviedo, from which he was transferred to Barcelona. In 1889 he became a member of the Reial Acadèmia de Bones Lletres de Barcelona. In 1904 he taught Catalan literature at the Estudis Universitaris Catalans and in 1906 he was vice-president of the First International Congress of the Catalan Language (I Congrés Internacional de la Llengua Catalana / Primer Congrés Internacional de la Llengua Catalana). The next year (1907) he was named both a member and the first president of the Institute for Catalan Studies. He later presided over the Jocs Florals in Barcelona.

Politically, Rubió y Lluch defended Greek aspirations for Crete and, in 1897, inspired by Prat de la Riba, he wrote a manifesto of the Greek cause in the name of the institutions of Catalan civil life. He was recognised as honorary Greek consul at Barcelona for eight years and received the Greek decoration of "Knight of the Order of the Saviour"). He was made an honorary member of the Parnassos Literary Society.

As well, he was a member of the Reial Acadèmia Catalana de Belles Arts de Sant Jordi, a correspondent of the Academia de la Historia de Madrid and the Academia Española (1930). He also served as president of the Centre Excursionista de Catalunya.

Among his students Ángel Valbuena Prat is particularly notable. Among his famous teachings were that Catalan did not exist as an independent language prior to 1326. Rubió y Lluch edited documents for Historia de la cultura Catalana Mitgeval or Documentos para la historia de la cultura catalana medieval (1908). He also edited Curial y Guelfa: Novela catalana del quinzen segle for the Reial Academia and translated Novelas griegas por Demetrio Bikelas, Jorge Drosinis, Argyros Eftaliotis et al. (Barcelona: Durán y Ca., 1893), a collection of Byzantine novels.

== Chronological list of works ==
- Estudio crítico-bibliográfico sobre Anacreonte y la colección anacreóntica, y su influencia en la literatura antigua y moderna. Tesis doctoral leída el 9 de noviembre de 1878 en la Facultad de Filosofía y Letras de la Universidad de Madrid (Barcelona: Viuda é Hijos de J. Subirana, 1879)
- El sentimiento del honor en el teatro de Calderón: monografía premiada por la Real Academia de Buenas Letras de Barcelona, with a prologue by Marcelino Menéndez Pelayo (Barcelona: Viuda é Hijos de J. Subirana, 1882)
- La expedición y dominación de los catalanes en Oriente juzgadas por los griegos: monografía leída... Real Academia de Buenas Letras de Barcelona en los días 12 y 26 de febrero y 12 de marzo de 1883 (Barcelona: Jaime Jepús Roviralta, 1883)
- Juan Cortada, Pedro F. Monclau, Balmes, Fernando Patxot, José de Manjarrés. Cuadros biográficos, with Cayetano Vidal de Valenciano and Julián Bastinos (Barcelona: Jaime Joaquín, 1885)
- Los navarros en Grecia y el ducado catalán de Atenas en la época de su invasión (Barcelona: Jaime Jepús Roviralta, 1886)
- Don Guillermo Ramón de Moncada: bosquejo histórico (Barcelona: Sucesores de N. Ramírez y Cª, 1886)
- El renacimiento clásico en la literatura catalana: discurso leído en su solemne recepción en la Real Academia de Buenas Letras de Barcelona, el día 17 de Junio de 1889 (Barcelona: Jaime Jepús Roviralta, 1889)
- Narraciones populares catalanas recogidas por Sebastián Farnés; traducidas libremente por A.R. LL. (Barcelona: Durán y Cª, 1893)
- Sumario de la Historia de la Literatura Española (Barcelona: Casa Provincial de Caridad, 1901)
- Discurso inaugural leído en la solemne apertura del curso académico de 1901 á 1902 ante el Claustro de la Universidad de Barcelona (Barcelona: Montserrat, 1901)
- (ed.) Curial y Güelfa (1901)
- Discurso en conmemoración del Tercer Centenario de la publicación del "Quijote" : que para la solemne sesión que celebró la Universidad de Barcelona el 9 de Mayo de 1905 escribió... el Dr. D. Antonio Rubió y Lluch (Barcelona: La Académica de Serra Hermanos y Russell, 1905)
- Catalunya a Grecia. Estudis historics i literaris (Barcelona: Biblioteca Popular de L'Avenç, 1906)
- La Acrópolis de Atenas en la época catalana (Barcelona: Barcelonesa, 1908)
- Discurso en elogio del Dr. D. Marcelino Menéndez y Pelayo por Antonio Rubió y Lluch leído en la solemne sesión pública que la Universidad de Barcelona dedicó a honrar la memoria de aquel... el día 18 de Mayo de 1913 (Barcelona: Tipografía Hijos de Domingo Casanovas, 1913)
- Manuel Milà i Fontanals: Notes biogràfiques i crítiques (Barcelona: Durán, 1918)
- Documents per la Historia de la cultura catalana mig-eval, 2 vol, Antoni Rubio y Lluch éd., Barcelone, Institut d’Estudis catalans (1921)
- Estudios Hispano-Americanos: Colección de artículos publicados desde 1889 a 1922 (Bilbao: Eléxpuru Hermanos, 1923)
- Los catalanes en Grecia: últimos años de su dominación, cuadros históricos (Madrid: Voluntad, 1927)
- Discursos leídos ante la Real Academia Española en la recepción pública de Antonio Rubió y Lluch el día 23 de marzo de 1930 (Barcelona: Ángel Ortega, 1930)
- La població de la Grècia catalana en el XIV^{èn} segle (Barcelona: Institut d'Estudis Catalans, 1933)
- Diplomatari de l'Orient català (1301-1409). Collecció de documents per a la història de l'expedició catalana a Orient i dels ducats d'Atenes i Neopàtria (Barcelona: Institut d'Estudis Catalans, 1947; reprinted 2001 with an introduction by Maria Teresa Ferrer i Mallol) (completed from Rubió's notes and published posthumously)
- El record dels catalans en la tradició popular, històrica i literària de Grècia, ed. Eusebi Ayensa i Prat (Barcelona: Publicacions de l'Abadia de Montserrat, 2001) (written in 1926, unpublished and lost, re-discovered in 1991)
