= List of erotica by Thomas Rowlandson =

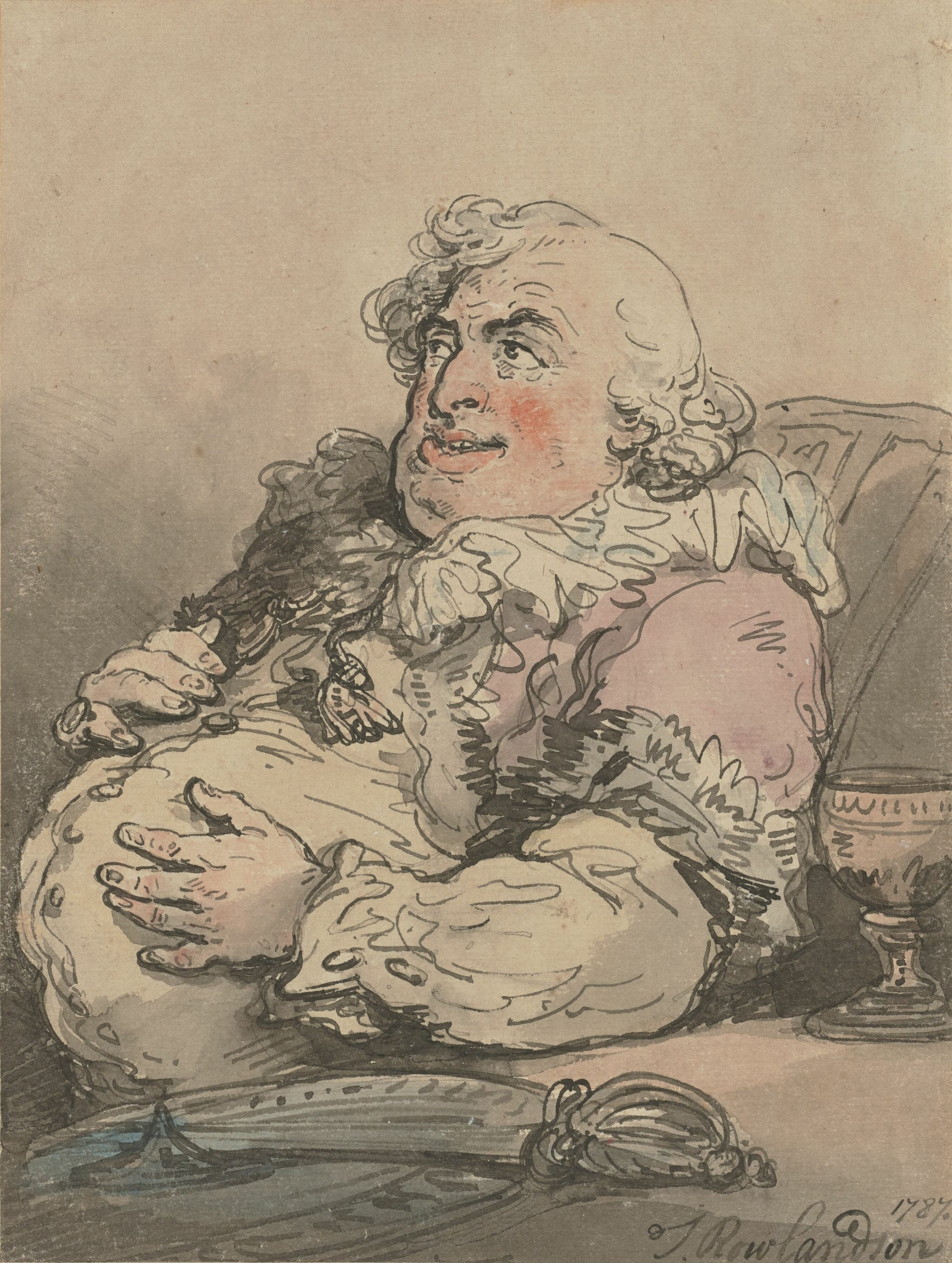
Discomforts of an Epicure, 1787 (image 27 x 20 cm, in mat 43 x 33 cm)

This is a descriptive list of erotic etchings and drawings by Thomas Rowlandson, based upon the research of Henry Spencer Ashbee published in his three-volume bibliography of curious and uncommon books: Index Librorum Prohibitorum (1877), Centuria Librorum Absconditorum (1879) and Catena Librorum Tacendorum (1885). Many of the works cited by Ashbee have been reprinted in Gert Schiff's The Amorous Illustrations of Thomas Rowlandson (1969) and Kurt von Meier's The Forbidden Erotica of Thomas Rowlandson (1970). The list also includes a few satirical and political caricatures and some which are merely free or indecent but not erotic or obscene.

== Etchings and engravings ==
Image (Note: May not be the original etching or etchings described by Ashbee.)	Title	Interpretation	Description	Comments	Notes
	A Music master toning his instrument	An interior. A young man is reclining on his back upon an old fashioned harpsichord, with two thick books supporting his head. One girl, naked with the exception of her shift which is rolled up round her waist, straddles across him; they are in the act; whilst another girl, standing at the end of the harpsichord, is tickling the man's testicles with her right hand, and pleasuring herself with her left.	"The drawing is good, and the attitudes quite possible".		
	Tally I O the Grinder	Exterior of an inn with sign of "Cock and Bottle". An old man is holding a knife on a grindstone, his member in a state of erection. One girl is turning the handle of the grindstone, and another, standing above it, is urinating upon it; both girls are almost entirely naked, and their figures are plump. To the right, a man is seated on a bench in the act with a wench astraddle across his legs. From two windows of the inn peep out an old woman, and an old man evidently having connection with a chubby wench behind whom he stands.	"The whole composition is full of movement; the drawing is correct, and altogether it is a very good specimen of Rowlandson's art." There is a reproduction of this plate; the size is the same, and the figures are not turned; "it is, however, not so bold and free in execution as the original, is much softened down, and carried out in great part in stipple, which is not the case in the plate etched by Rowlandson; moreover, the hair and faces of the girls differ."		
	The Star Gazer	"I have known many a Man to have been made a Cuckold of in the twinkling of a Star". An interior; the walls arched, and the floor strewed with books and two globes; with a dog in the foreground. An old man, in dressing gown and slippers, with open mouth, is gazing through a telescope; while, in an adjoining room, of which the doors are half open, a couple are in the act upon a bed.	"The moon-light pouring in through the window at which the old man sits is well managed."		
	Carnival at Venice	A street. There are numerous figures, the central one of which is a naked girl standing on hands and feet backwards in a hoop. Another naked girl is collecting money from the spectators; and a man is playing a barrel-organ. The spectators are strongly caricatured, and have their members exposed. At three windows overlooking the street, libidinous scenes are being enacted; and at the corner of the street, a quack is administering a clyster to a woman kneeling on a platform.	"The composition is very clever and satirical, and is a good specimen of Rowlandson's talent."		
	A Dutch Serglio [sic]	Interior of a hovel. Two couples in the act: the one seated on a low chair, the other upon a bed in an alcove, the woman on her knees above the man who is on his back. Both couples are almost naked, that in the foreground on the chair are drinking at the same time. A dog and cat are playing on the floor.	"The drawing is not very good, nor is the subject a pleasing one."		
	Lady H******* Attitudes (Note: Lady Hamilton's Attitudes.)	Title in the design. Interior of a studio. An old man holds back a curtain, and points to a naked girl, who stands upright, and is posing to a youth seated on a low chair, with an easel before him; he draws with one hand and holds an eye glass up to his eye with the other. To the right, in the background, are two figures upstanding and embracing each other, and in the left hand fore corner, on the ground, are two heads placed as if they were kissing.	"The composition is spirited, and the drawing, especially of the naked woman, good." Titled by Paulson: "The Dancer".		
	French Dancers at a Morning Rehearsal	Interior of a kind of barn. Seven figures; a girl, holding out her shift, her only garment, her breasts as well as all the lower part of the body bare, with two feathers in her hair, is dancing with an old man who is playing on a fiddle, his member exposed and erect; to the left another man, playing the fiddle, is having intercourse with a girl kneeling before him; to the right, a naked girl stands at a tub washing; in the centre background, a man is sitting on a chamber pot, and a girl is beating a tambourine.	"The dancing girl is fairly drawn and finished, but the man dancing with her is faulty in outline and somewhat caricatured; the other figures are quite mediocre."		
	The Rival Knights or the Englishman in Paris	Interior. A girl, with a large feather in her head, her shift tucked up round her waist, kneels on a bed between two old men with their breeches down—one very fat, the other slight and small,—she holds the member of each in her hands, and appears to be drawing them to her; the men, with clenched fists, are making pugnacious demonstrations behind her back. On the mantle-piece, right, are a bottle, and a monkey, with member erect, playing the fiddle.	"The drawing and finish are good, especially of the girl's posteriors—a favourite part with Rowlandson,—and the composition has much life in it."		
	———— (Note: No title, but with following subscription: Quest. When an Old Man Marries a young Woman what is he to expect? Ans. Why to be made a Cuckold of.)	Interior. A very fat, gouty old man sits before the fire, writhing with pain, while a young couple are in the act in the adjoining room, of which the door is open; an old woman enters by a door at the further end of the back room, and seems much surprised. There is a cat in the immediate foreground.	"The drawing and finish are pretty good." Titled by Von Meier: "The Old Man", and by Schiff: "The Old Husband".		
	A Scene in the Farce called the Citizen	Interior. A young man with his breeches down sits upon a table, and holds a girl across, and facing him; her feet are upon the same table; with his right hand he clasps her rump, and with his left holds up her clothes above her waist; both have hats on. An old man peeps out from beneath the table, his fists are clenched, and his face expresses great anger.	"Both drawing and engraving are good. The girl's position is difficult". See also Arthur Murphy.		
	Out Posts of a Camp	Exterior. A soldier standing upright, his pigtail sticking out, and his breeches about his knees, is enjoying a plump girl seated on a drum underneath a tree. Another soldier at some little distance, seated on the ground, is examining the genitals of a lass extended before him. In the distance are tents.	"[T]he perspective is faulty."		
	A Finishing Stroke	In a well decorated room, a young couple are in the act on a couch; two old men enter by a half opened door, one peeping through the key hole, the other pointing a blunderbuss at the unsuspecting young people.	"Although the drawing of the young man is very incorrect, great force and energy are brought out". Titled by Schiff: "The Observers".		
	A Family on a Journey Laying the Dust	Exterior. Four figures, with a dog, and a horse in an old fashioned chaise, are all urinating; the man is erect in the chaise, the three women, in different attitudes, are all naked up to the waist.	"The composition is most original and quaint."		
	Jolly Gipsies	Exterior. A young man and woman, quite naked, are in the act upon the ground under a tree; other gipsies a little distance off are disporting themselves; there is a pot suspended on three sticks over a fire. To the right are two dogs copulating; and to the left are two asses.	"[T]he animals, as is usual with Rowlandson, are vilely drawn; the central couple display much vigour."		
	Inquest of Matrons or Trial for a Rape	Interior. The design is divided: to the right a woman, almost naked, is stretched on her back upon a bed, while four old crones are examining her; the left shows us the court with the judge on the bench, the prisoner before him, lawyers, and others in their places; an old man of repulsive ugliness is peeping through the door at the examination of the woman.	"The drawing is not good, and the etching is very rough, but the composition is original and striking." The right hand half of this etching has been reproduced. See also Virginity test.		
	The Rookery	Exterior. On a seat In the porch of rural dwelling, couple are act, seated facing each other; their countenances expressive great delight. girl is watching them and frigging herself with her right hand, while left she holds trunk tree underneath which stands; breasts lower part persons both women bare. fat old man sits at window house smoking pipe, looking bird wicker cage suspended outside. foreground left, cock treading hen; foliage nearly covers house.	"This is a pretty composition, ably drawn and finished; the tale is well told, and the figures display much life and movement".		
	Meditations among the Tombs	A church-yard. A fat parson is reading the burial service over a grave surrounded by several mourners; while to the left, against a window of the church, a countryman and a lass are copulating in an upright posture; the girl's clothes are up above her posterior, which is very plump, and into which the swain is inserting the middle finger of his right hand. (Note: The tombstones are ornamented with phalli, and have the following inscriptions: Life is a jest and all things shew it I thought so once but now I know it. Here lies intombed beneath these bricks The scabbard of ten thousand Pricks. To the Memory of Roger Pego)	"The drawing and general composition are good". See also James Hervey.		
	Les Lunettes from les Contes de La Fontaine	Interior of a convent. An old nun is seated in an arm chair, surrounded by ten nuns in various attitudes, and generally naked up to the middle; she has her hands upon the hips of a young man dressed like a nun, whose erect penis is sticking almost into the old woman's eye.	"Drawing and execution rough, but effective." See Jean de La Fontaine, "Les Lunettes" (Contes et nouvelles en verse). Examining Samuel Spalding's The Philosophy of Christian Morals (1843) reveals this scene on its fore-edge.		
	Such Things are or a peep into Kensington Gardens	A garden. Various figures of the most grotesque character, some with enormous members, two representing Phalli themselves, are embracing each other with the utmost lasciviousness; one young woman is running away in a fright; on a bench to the left are two partially erect Phalli; the back ground is filled in with trees.	"This is a most remarkable and original composition. … This composition displays much force, power and weird humour."		
	Lord Barr—res (Note: Barrymores. The noble family consisted of three brothers and a sister, nick-named severally, on account of their peculiarities: Hell-gate, Cripple-gate, New-gate and Billins-gate.) Great Bottle Club (Note: With the following couplet: With Women and Wine I defy every care For Life without these is a volume of care.)	Interior. Six couples, around a table, are disporting themselves in the lewdest manner, and in various attitudes; all the women are naked up to the waist; one girl, with her clothes tucked over one arm, is dancing on the table, a punch-bowl in her hand.	"Drunkenness and debauchery run riot throughout the composition, which is full of movement. The drawing is not bad, but is scarcely more than in outline."		
	————	Exterior of a cottage; to the right and left of which are two couples in the act; an old woman with a broom is beating two dogs stuck together, while another woman from the window is endeavouring to drive away two cats who are amusing themselves on the roof.	"The drawing is poor, and the engraving rough, the animals, as usual, are very badly done." Titled by Von Meier: "A Rage of Passion". Titled by Schiff: "Sympathy II".		
	————	Four musicians, one a black man, are playing; the stiff members of three of them are bare. Another, entirely clothed, and seated on a drum, is playing the flute, with a naked girl sitting on his lap, and playing the tambourine. A very fat female child, quite naked (to the right) is striking the triangle.	"The naked girl, the central figure, is well drawn, her face is pleasing, and has a good deal of expression; … This is a strange and original composition." Titled by Schiff: "The Tambourine".		
	————	Interior. A harlequin and columbine are lying together asleep on a couch, the girl's plump hinder parts are entirely bare, her right leg thrown over her companion, while his member, in a flaccid state, is reposing on her left thigh; a pierrot is discovering them. In the left hand fore corner is a vase, with phallic designs.	See Commedia dell'arte.		
	———— [The Jugglers]	In an open street, upon a platform surrounded by many figures, are a stout man, balancing on his enormous, erect member a kind of vase, and a girl, naked up to the waist, holding out her petticoats to catch the money thrown to her from the windows; a small devil playing a tambourine, and with a trumpet in his anus dances behind the man and woman on the platform.	"This is a most remarkable conception, very extravagant, but full of life." Titled by Schiff: "The Jugglers".		
	————	Interior. A Turk, seated on a carpet, a pipe in his left hand, and his stiff member peeping out from his robes, is gazing at a vast number of naked women standing in two rows, one above the other, before him.	"The conception is not happy, and the execution is rough." Titled by Schiff and others: "The Harem". Cf. The Turkish Bath and Vathek. See Orientalism and History of concubinage in the Muslim world.		
	————	A young man, whose legs do not indicate very great muscular power, is carrying a girl in his arms across a brook, while at the same time he is having connection with her; the girl's legs, posteriors, and bosom are bare; and the youth's member is very strongly developed. An ugly dog follows with a stick and bundle in his mouth. The background is filled in with trees.	"The girl is prettily drawn, but the proportions of the man are incorrect."		
	Lavarro [sic] Deluso	Title upon book in the foreground. An old and repulsively ugly miser is sitting beside a box filled with bags of money; one girl at his side is handling his member; while a second girl, seated on a bed before him, is exposing herself to his view; both the females are almost entirely naked.	"The drawing is unequal, and the execution rough." Titled by Schiff: "The Miser"		
	————	Interior of a convent. A monk, naked, with the exception of a skull cap, is on his knees, and is copulating with a nun who is kneeling before him with her posteriors bare, and from whom he is separated by a railing; a second nun, entirely dressed, is supporting her companion; the monk turns towards the right. In the back ground is an altar with crucifix and two cups. The plate is inscribed: "Etch^{d} & Pub^{d} by Fuck a Pace Jack".	"The drawing is good, and very bold and effective; the etching is rough but well done; and the whole composition is most striking." There is an imitation of this plate. Size 10 1/4 by 8 inches (260 by 200 mm). It is executed chiefly in stipple and aquatint, is much softened, and reversed; the monk's head is turned round, away from the nuns, and is without the skull cap. "The force and effect of the original are much diminished." See Venus in the Cloister.		
	Rural Sports or Coney Hunting	In a field surrounded by trees, three girls, two standing and one reclining on a bank, are exposing themselves to an old man seated on a stile, with a stick between his legs, and in wig and three cornered hat; a younger man stands behind him, and points to the women. A large tree rises to the left, the branches of which spread over three parts of the picture.	"This is an agreeable composition, well drawn and etched; all five figures are full of life."		
	————	A couple, almost naked, upon a couch, are surprised by a spectre in armour, who brandishes an axe over them; great horror is depicted upon the faces of the guilty pair. The apartment is that of an ancient castle; and to the left is an equestrian statue in armour.	"The drawing is not always quite correct, and the execution is rough; but there is much vigour in the figures on the couch, particularly in that of the woman." Titled by Von Meier: "Revenge"; by Schiff: "The Ancestor".		
	————	Interior. A woman is kneeling on a low bed, while an old man, entirely dressed, and with a bag wig and hat on, is examining her through his spectacles; with his right hand he holds up her shift above her navel; the woman has on a night cap and slippers.	This composition has been imitated in an engraving, 6 by 8 3/8 inches (150 by 210 mm), partly line and partly stipple, badly executed, with title in the left hand corner The Connoisseur. Titled by Schiff: "The Curious Parson".		
	————	Interior of a cloister or church. A youth, dressed, and in a student's square hat, is seated before a pretty country girl, who holds her clothes up to her middle; he is touching her pudendum with the fore finger of his left hand.			
	————	Interior. A woman, in an upright posture, her left leg kneeling on a bench covered with a robe, holds in her right hand that of a little boy who is standing behind her. To the left are a girl, and a statue of Priapus without arms, to the right one of Silenus.			
	————	Interior. A pretty, plump girl, seated in an antique arm chair, her legs stretched wide apart, is holding her clothes up above her navel, her breasts are also bare. In the foreground are a figure seated on a pedestal, a bust of a female, and a dildo; in the background, to the right, are several erect statues.	"Design and execution good." Titled by Schiff: "Lonesome Pleasures".		
	Fantocinni	Title in the design. Interior. A man, in a pointed hat and pigtail, is reclining backwards upon a square barrel-organ, and having connection with a woman who is straddling across him, her posteriors towards his face, while she looks into a puppet-show; he holds a trumpet to her anus. Another girl, behind, is beating a tambourine; and to the right is a monkey.	"This is a most strange and original composition."		
	————	Interior. A girl, with her legs very wide apart, her pudendum thoroughly exposed and quite open, is sitting on a raised bank or bench, her right arm is bent over her head, and with her left hand, stretched out, she holds up her shift. Ten men, of whom the wig-covered heads only are visible, are gazing at her.	"The drawing of the girl's right arm is very faulty." Titled by Schiff: "The Congregation".		
	————	Interior. A chubby, laughing girl is kneeling on a bed, her posteriors entirely exposed, while two old men, fully dressed, are staring in amazement at the beauties exposed to their view.	Titled by Schiff: "Susanna and the Elders". See also Susanna and the Elders in art.		
	————	Exterior. A girl, in a pointed cap, with nothing else on but slippers and a shift rolled up under her breasts, and her legs spread wide apart, is swinging; while four curiously dressed musicians, standing underneath, are playing various instruments, and gazing at her.	"This composition is most eccentric and original." Titled by Schiff and Von Meier: "The Swing".		
	————	An old man and a girl are swinging in separate swings; the girl's legs, hips and breasts are exposed, and in her head are two large feathers; the old man is very ugly, wears a cocked hat, pigtail, spectacles, and top boots with spurs; his breeches are at his knees, and his belly and member exposed. In the distance is a river with two sailing boats, &c.	Titled by Schiff: "The Swings"		
	————	Interior of a cloister. A young nun, naked to the waist, with her right leg drawn up and passed over her left, is lying on her back on a bed; with her right hand she is touching herself, while in her left she holds an enormous dildo. An old nun is entering at the cell door.	Titled by Von Meier: "The Timely Visit". See Aretino's Postures.		
	————	Interior. A girl, with her clothes rolled up round her middle, her breasts naked, and her legs thrown wide apart, reclines on an elegant couch; while six old men, whose heads only appear, stand at the foot of the couch, and examine her. To the right, on the floor, is a handsome vase filled with dildoes, and an open book lies beside the couch.	Titled by Schiff: "The Inspection".		
	————	Interior. An ugly man, smoking a long pipe, a bottle in his left, and a glass in his right hand, is having intercourse with a plump girl, who straddles across his legs with her posteriors turned towards him; she is naked, with exception of her shift which is tucked up round her middle, and she wears a wide brimmed hat and ringlets. The top of the design is filled in with curtains; and in the foreground are a coffee pot and a plate of fruit.			
	————	Interior of a stable. A huntsman leans against the manger, and copulates with a woman whose left leg he supports with his right hand, while he presses her right leg, of which the foot touches the ground, between his knees; her arms are round his neck.	"The position appears to be a very difficult one. There are a horse and two dogs, very badly drawn." Titled by Schiff: "The Happy Huntsman".		
	————	Interior of a very elegantly furnished apartment, with statues and a large antique vase. A young man reclines on a couch, his feet on the ground; a girl bends over him, her right foot on the ground, and her left on the couch, and with her right hand guides his erect member to its goal; they are both entirely naked.	"The drawing is spirited, and the composition pleasing, and in the style of the Italian masters." Note the Graeco-Roman and Egyptian elements. Titled by Schiff: "The Modern Pygmalion". Titled by Von Meier: "The Ancients".		
	Empress of Russia reviewing her Body Guard	Exterior. A very fat, middle aged woman is leaning against a cannon, her clothes are up above her waist, and a hussar, pipe in mouth, is enjoying her. Several other hussars, their members exposed, stand or sit around.	Titled by Schiff: "The Empress of Russia Receiving her Brave Guards"; by Von Meier: "Catherine the Great".		
	————	Interior. An old man, in wig and spectacles, with one knee on the ground, administers a clyster to a woman, seated on a bed, with her clothes above her middle, and her legs stretched wide asunder; the doctor inserts his syringe in the wrong hole; on the woman's countenance is depicted the horror she feels at his mistake. To the left, three women sit round a table; to the right, are a chamber pot, a night stool, &c.; and behind the doctor is a box labelled "Medicine Chest"	Titled by Schiff: "The Operation".		
	————	On the sea shore. Two couples are copulating in a boat, which is partly on shore and partly in the water; one of the girls, whose legs, hips, and breasts are bare, rests on the extreme edge of the boat, while the youth, who is enjoying her, appears to be pushing the boat off by the force he is using in having connection with her. To the left, a fat woman, her clothes up above her middle, urinates with a visible stream.	"There is much vigour in the composition."		
	————	Interior of a cellar. An old man, in a wig, with his breeches about his knees, is having intercourse with a young woman against three barrels, on the last of which is a pail; her legs, hips, and breasts are bare. A jug stands under the first barrel, and the liquor is running over; to the left is a flight of stairs.	"The drawing is good, and the composition pleasing." There is an imitation of this composition, turned, and etched rather faintly in line; the stairs are suppressed, and the pail standing on the last cask is replaced by a hat.		
	Essay on Quakerism	Title in the design upon an open book. Interior of a well furnished bedroom. A quaker, holding up his shirt with both hands, and his breeches about his knees, stands on tip toes in the middle of the room; one girl, with a large feather in her hair, sits on a bed, with her legs wide apart, and exposes her genitals to his astonished gaze; a second girl, reclining on the same bed, handles his enormous member, and a third female, on another couch behind, pushes him forward with her left foot, which she has planted between his shoulders. The three women are naked, with exception of their shifts, which are, as usual, rolled round their waists.	"The composition is humourous [sic] and lascivious, but the perspective is not correct." Titled by Schiff: "The Inexperienced Yokel".		
	————	Interior. A gouty old man, with spectacles on nose, reclines in a low arm chair, plays the fiddle, and copulates with a girl who stands across him with her back, on which she holds an open music book, turned towards him, her legs and posteriors are bare, and the man's member is visible. A second girl, naked up to a waist, is playing a violoncello; and a third girl, quite naked is beating a tambourine. All four figures are singing. To the right, leaning against the wall, is a violoncello-case, and to the left, on the floor, are a plate of fruit, a wine glass, and a bottle labelled "Rumbo".	"The drawing is fairly correct, and the composition, in spite of its extravagance, is agreeable." Titled by Schiff and Von Meier: "The Concert".		
	The Merry Traveller and kind Chambermaid	Interior of a bedroom. A pretty servant-girl, on her knees, is inserting a warming pan into a bed, while a young officer kneels behind her, and enjoys her; with his right hand he holds the girl's clothes above her posteriors, which are entirely exposed, and with his left he raises his own shirt. A lighted candle is on the ground.	"This is a very pretty engraving, well drawn and finished; the girl's … face displays the satisfaction she feels at what is being done to her."		
	Cunnyseurs	Interior of a cottage. A girl, stark naked on a bed, standing almost on her head, with her posteriors up in the air, is being examined by three old men, who stand round her with their faces close to her fundament; they are dressed, but the members of two of them are exposed; the faces of two display great delight, while that of the third indicates disgust. A fourth old man peeps in through a half-opened door. The girl is smiling.	"This is a remarkable composition, and very original in conception; the posture in which the woman is represented is difficult but not impossible."		
	————	Interior of a public-house. A youth, lying flat on his back on a bench, copulates with a girl who straddles across him; she is dressed in a hat and feather, and waves with her right hand a handkerchief to a ship, visible through the open window; her clothes are rolled up above her waist, ut semper, and her posteriors and breasts are bare. In the background another couple are in the act. A magpie in a cage hangs on the wall, and a bulldog lies on the floor.	"There is much spirit in this composition, which is very pleasing, and the drawing of the figures is good." The bulldog, however, is "very badly drawn".		
	————	Interior. A youth and a lass are asleep on a sofa, their heads in opposite directions, but their private parts, which are entirely exposed, together; the girl's right leg is over the young man's shoulder. An old man, rage depicted on his face, is about to stab the youth with a dagger, which he brandishes in his right hand, while, in his left, he holds a lighted candle. A woman is entering at the door, which he has left open behind him. On the floor, in the front, are the youth's clothes.	"There is much spirit in the composition, and the story is well told." Titled by Schiff: "The Revenge".		
	————	A garden. A man, on a ladder, trims a tree in the form of a phallus; two women below are watching him, and touching themselves: the one standing up and holding a parasol over her shoulders, the other seated on the ground; both are naked up to the middle; the gardener's breeches are split behind, and his posteriors and member are visible. Further down the garden, a couple, on a bench, are vigorously in the act. There are two tubs, out of each of which grows a phallus; and to the right, is a male statue.	"This is a most strange and original conception; both drawing and finish are good." See Phallic architecture and The Fruit-Shop.		
	————	In a field, a soldier, sitting on the ground, and supporting himself on his left elbow, is having connection with a country wench who is astride across him, her buttocks fully exposed, and turned towards his face, and her clothes up above her middle; they are behind a mound, or hay rick, round which a countryman, with a pitch-fork in his hand, comes and surprises them.	"This is a pretty little etching, perspective good, and composition pleasing."		
	————	Interior. A naked youth, erect, is having connection with a girl thrown back on a bed; she is nude, with exception of her shift, which is rolled up under her bare breasts, her left leg is resting on the man's shoulder, and her right arm turned behind her own head. Fireplace to the left.	"The drawing is good, and the man's figure displays much power. A very agreeable composition."		
	————	Interior. A man and woman, seated on a chair, are playing the same harp together; she is seated on his lap, the lower part of her person entirely naked, two feathers in her head; they are copulating. To the left, behind a screen, sits an old woman asleep before the fire with a bottle and glass under her chair. To the right, a window with a small table and a chair before it. On the floor an open music-book.	"The drawing is good, the composition pleasant, and the tale is well told."		
	————	A young man and woman in a boat on a river, the young man lying in the bottom of the boat, and the girl sitting over him, her bare posteriors turned towards his face; she handles the oars, and is rowing away from an old man, who, on the bank (left), is making gestures of great rage, stick in hand. On the right bank is an Italian temple surrounded by trees; and on the river, in the background, are two swans.	"The drawing is good, the etching is in outline only, but delicately done."		
	————	Interior. A man leans backwards on a kind of couch on wheels, in an almost perpendicular posture, a woman on each side; she on the left side is handling his rigid member with her left hand; she on his right side, with one knee on the ground, pulls towards him a third girl suspended in a swing to which a cord is attached; all four figures are entirely naked, the girl in the swing holds her legs up in the air, and spread wide apart ready for the encounter. A small dog stands on his hind legs and barks at her. An antique jug and cup are on the floor in the foreground, right.	"The figures are fairly drawn, and are full of movement."		
	————	Interior. Two naked girls, kneeling on one knee on a kind of bed spread on the floor, are supporting in their arms a third naked woman whose legs they hold wide apart, and whom they present to a man standing opposite, whose erect member shows that he is eager for the encounter; he is entirely naked with exception of a turban; behind him stands a fourth woman entirely dressed, and who appears to have been aiding the man to disrobe. On the floor, in foreground, lie a sword, buckler, and antique cup.	"Drawing good; the figures, particularly that of the man, possess much vigour. This and the design immediately before noticed form a pair."		
	The Dairy Maids delight	Interior. A country girl, upstanding, with her posterior pushed well back, her breasts, arms, and all the lower part of her person bare, is working with both hands a perpendicular churn; while a fat black man, supporting himself by his right hand on a table, his left holding up the dairy-maid's clothes, is stooping forward, and penetrating her. To the right, a fat black cat on a table is lapping milk out of a dish; above, a small window; on the wall, at the back, is a shelf with two dishes on it, and underneath, hangs a jug; in the foreground, a pail and platter.	"[H]is face indicates great enjoyment, and hers has a thoroughly licorous expression. … The drawing and execution are good; and although the black man's posture is exceedingly difficult, the composition is characteristic and pleasing".		
	————				
	————	The same composition as the above, but in place of the window is a clock with a phallus instead of hands.	"[I]t is not so fully finished" [as the above].		
	————	A Turk, seated on an ottoman; is surrounded by five naked girls who are endeavouring in every way to excite him: one clasps him round the neck, another grasps his huge, erect member.	"The grouping is good, but the drawing is not perfect, and the execution rough." Titled by Schiff: "The Pasha".		
	————	The same composition as the above, with the figures turned, and engraved in a different manner.			
	————	Exterior. In a cavern by the sea shore, four sailors are disporting themselves with three mermaids; one other man is occupied with the boat which is hauled up on land; while a second man, an oar in hand, is prepared to do battle with a merman who is swimming towards them, his fists brandished in the air in sign of great rage.	"The composition and drawing are good, and the engraving effective."		
	————	Interior, probably of a church or temple. A plump girl, leaning on the back of a chair which is atilt, her right arm reposing on the plinth of a column, and her right foot upon a stool, has her clothes up above her navel, and her breasts bare; she has a hat and stockings on; an old soldier, his penis erect and exposed, is directed at her from behind the column. In the foreground left, are a glass and a bowl with a ladle in it.	"The drawing is not correct, but the girl's person and face are attractive, and the composition pleasing."		
	————	Interior. A girl, with her shift rolled round her waist, her person otherwise entirely nude, leans back on a bed and admires herself in a looking-glass placed on a dressing table before her; her left arm is bent over her head, her legs are stretched well apart, and her left foot reposes on the dressing-table, from underneath which an old man on all fours is observing her.	"The drawing is not very good, but the composition is pleasing; it forms a pendant to the subject immediately before noticed."		
	————	Interior. A youth, lying on his back on a bed, is copulating with a girl kneeling across him (attitude St. George), while with his right hand he is touching the private parts of another girl seated on the same bed, with her right leg well drawn up to facilitate his operation; she holds a glass in her right hand, and a hand-screen in her left. On a table, to the right, is a plate of fruit.	"[B]oth girls are, as usual, naked with exception of their shifts rolled round their waists; their buttocks are ample and very voluptuous; their faces not agreeable. … The composition is somewhat overdrawn, but nevertheless attractive."		
	————	Under a tree, an old parson is penetrating with a girl, whose breasts and buttocks are exposed, and who is lying on the back of the clerk, on his knees underneath her; she has her left hand on the parson's shoulder, and with her right holds on to a branch of the tree. A church is visible in the background, and in the foreground, left, lie a bible and a three cornered hat.	"The drawing is good, and the composition full of life and humour."		
	Le Tableau Parlant or Speaking Picture	Interior. A man in hat and feather, with his posteriors and penis exposed, is kneeling on a bed and about to have connection with a girl seated on the same bed with shift, her only garment, up to her waist. Through the mantle-glass (left) the head of a man, apparently dressed like a pierrot, with horror depicted on his countenance, appears, and disturbs the amorous couple. There is a sofa to the left, and a guitar to the right of the composition.	"The drawing is fair, and the idea original, but the execution is poor." See Le tableau parlant.		
	————	A youth and a girl, seated at a table, are copulating; the girl is astride on the young man's lap, with her back towards him, although she turns her face round to his. On the table are a bowl and wine glass. In the background, a couple are standing, the female having hold of the immense priapus of her companion. In the front, a woman lies on the floor, with her face turned downwards, apparently vomiting.	"The drawing is very bold, though not always correct; the etching is sketchy and unfinished."		
	————	Bacchus, kneeling, is having connection with a girl seated under a tree; her legs are over his shoulders, and both are entirely nude and crowned with grapes and vine leaves. In the background, five nymphs and satyrs dance, copulate, and play antics. In the foreground, right, are a vase and cup.	"The treatment is semi-classical, and the composition well done."		
	————	In a bed-room, a very fat man, in his shirt, is embracing the chamber-maid, fully dressed; her right arm is passed round his neck, and with the candle which she holds in the same hand she is burning his hair. The man's shirt projects in front showing the excited state of his feelings. A warming pan, the handle of which is in shape of a phallus, is in the bed, which is smoking. A chair, with a cat on it, to the left.	"The drawing and execution are good, and the composition humourous [sic] and bordering on the burlesque; the design is well filled in."		
	———— [Diana and Her Nymphs Spied on by Satyrs]	Two naked females, apparently overcome by the fatigue of the chase, are reposing by the trunk of a tree; a quiver and spear lie beside them; and they are surrounded by game. Two satyrs discover them; and the head and shoulders of a third woman are visible behind the tree to the left. A couple of dogs lie in the foreground. Signed: "Rubens pinxit Rowlandson sculpt".	After Rubens, in reverse.		
	————	A young woman, quite nude, her left leg bent, and her left hand pressing her right breast, is refusing the solicitations of a naked Cupid, who is pulling her by the right hand; three obscene and satyric figures around. In the foreground, right, is a vase.	"The drawing is good, and the composition classical and pleasing."		
	————	No title, but the subject represented is Leda and the swan. Leda is reclining in a kind of cave, with drapery arranged round her, but her person entirely nude, a coronet on her head; with her right leg, which is raised over its back, she presses the swan to her; the swan's head nestles between her breasts, and its beak and her mouth are united. Two naked children are in the background, and an egg in the foreground, to the right. Signed: "Michael Angelus inv. Etched by Rowlandson 1799".	"The execution is rough; the figure of Leda is too masculine." After Michelangelo; see also Leda and the Swan.		
	———— [Ariadne Abandoned by Theseus]	A naked woman, with dishevelled hair, and in the attitude as if running, draws aside a curtain, and gazes at a ship sailing away; two naked boys are at her feet weeping. Signed: "G B Cipriani inv."	"The composition, which is classical and agreeable, represents Ariadne and Theseus."		
	————	Two naked girls are lying asleep beneath a tree, through the thick foliage of which a youth is peeping at them. A pipe and tambourine lie in the frontground. Signed: "Rowlandson 1799".	"The drawing is good, and the execution careful. This is not erotic but classical, and the work is signed". Titled by Schiff: "The Discovery".		
	————	Exterior. A nude woman is reposing under drapery arranged as a canopy; clouds and trees in the background; a naked, laughing Cupid is flying off with bow in left, and arrow in right hand. The work is subscribed, "Rowlandson. Pub^{d} by Hixon. 355 Strand near Exeter change April 6, 1800".	"A classical subject, of which the execution is not very effective."		
	———— [The Surprise]	One youth and three maidens, all entirely nude, are reclining under trees, on the bank of a river; one of the females is soliciting the young man. In the water, another couple are bathing, the man's left arm around the girl's waist. Signed, "Francesco Albano".	"Execution rough, but effective."		
	————	Four nymphs, in various attitudes, lie asleep under the shade of trees; three of them are entirely naked, the fourth has some drapery round her legs only. To the right, a couple of dogs are keeping watch; to the left is a bugle horn. The pudendum of the nymph in the immediate foreground is defined.	"This is a pretty and agreeable composition".		
	————	A girl, standing up to her thighs in a river, is bathing the right foot of another girl who is about to step into the water; both are entirely naked. Over head are the spreading, leafy branches of a tree. Subscribed: "Designed and Pub^{d} by T Rowlandson May 20, 1799".	"Drawing good; a charming and classical subject."		
	————	Two nude females are asleep under drapery suspended over the branch of a tree; they are both seated; one rests her head on her right hand, the head of the other reposes on her arms lying on a bank upon which she leans; a naked, chubby child slumbers on the ground beside them. Signed, outside the frame, "Cipriani".	"It is a pretty, and classical composition, although its meaning is not clear." After Giovanni Battista Cipriani.		
	The Sad Discovery or the Graceless Apprentice	Interior. A woman in bed is imploring mercy from three men and a woman, who are poking her lover, the apprentice, out from under the bed; in the confusion the chamber-pot is upset. Signed "Rowlandson, 1785".	"This composition is spirited, and suggestive, but scarcely indecent."		
	Lust and Avarice	A pretty girl is demanding money from an old, shrivelled-up man, who has his left hand in his breeches pocket, and is putting his tongue out of his mouth, and turning up his eyes. Signed: "Pub Nov^{r} 29 1788 by W^{m} Rowlandson N° 49 Broad Street Bloomsbury".	"Not indecent, simply suggestive."		
	Liberality and Desire	Pendant to above, and serial with it. A wooden legged and one eyed pensioner is giving a purse to a girl, while with the other hand he presses her breast. Signature as above, with omission of the street.	"Scarcely indecent."		
	Luxury; Misery; Harmony; Love	Here are four different compositions on two plates; two only are free, viz., Luxury and Love. In the former a man and woman are sitting up in bed and drinking tea, which a servant girl is offering them; the woman's bosom is bare, and the man presses one of her breasts with his right hand, which is passed round her waist. In Love, a couple are embracing on a couch; the man seems very eager, and the woman quite indifferent. All four compositions are signed: Luxury and Misery simply "T. Rowlandson", while to the other two are added the dates, Harmony 1785, Love 1796.	"Suggestive but not indecent."		
	Who's Mistress now	A servant girl, attired in her mistress's finery, is admiring herself before a looking-glass in the kitchen, while, through the half-opened door, three other girls are watching, and laughing at her. To the left, in the foreground, a cat is eating a fish. Signed "Rowlandson del".	"The heroine's breasts are fully exposed, but the composition is in no other respect free."		
	A Snip in a Rage	Interior. An old man, who appears at a window, and brandishes a large pair of shears, has disturbed a couple from their pleasures; the young man is just escaping into the adjoining apartment, while the girl stands beside the bed in her shift, with her hands folded over her bosom, and displays shame and regret; her legs are partially bare. Signed: "Rowlandson del. Published July 1st 1802 by S Howitt, Panton Street, Hay Mark^{t}".	"Suggestive but not obscene." See also The Rape of the Lock.		
	New Shoes	Interior of a dairy. A dairy-maid is lifting her clothes to show her feet and ankles to a student, who stoops to look at them, and seems very intent in his observation; an old man is observing them through a lattice-window; the girl's petticoats are raised only half way up her calves, but her bosom, as is usual with Rowlandson, is bare. Signed: "Rowlandson 1793", and outside the design are the publisher's name and address.			
	A Dutch Academy	Interior. A very fat, and ugly woman, stark naked, is seated up high upon a kind of bench, while twelve men surround her, some drawing, some smoking. Signed: "Pub^{d} by T Rowlandson. No 52 Strand. March 1792."			
	Intrusion on Study or the Painter disturbed	Interior of a studio. Two gentlemen are entering abruptly, while an artist is painting from a naked girl on a sofa before him; he holds up his hands as if to entreat them to retire; the girl is crying. Unsigned.			
	Connoisseurs	Interior of a picture-gallery. Four old men are gloating over a picture of Venus and Cupid placed on an easel before them. Signed: "Rowlandson. 1799. Pub^{d} June 20, 1799, by S. W. Fores No 50 Piccadilly".	"This composition is not indecent, but the expressions of the old men are most lascivious and suggestive."		
	Symptoms of Sanctity	Interior of a cloister. A bald, and very ugly monk is amorously gazing on the bare bosom of a girl who stands beside him, her hands joined as if in prayer; the holy man's right hand is on his penitent's breast, and his left reposes on her left shoulder. Signed: "Rowlandson fec 1800", and "Pub Jan^{y}. 20. 1801. by S. W. Fores, N° 50 Piccadilly".	"Not indecent, but highly suggestive." Cf. Ghirlandaio's An Old Man and his Grandson.		
	Touch for Touch, or a Female Physician in Full Practice	Interior. An impudent looking girl, with bosom exposed, and two feathers in her head, is receiving gold from an old man who is following her, as with her left hand she is opening the door to depart; the old man's face is expressive of lechery. On the wall hangs a picture of a naked woman reclining on her back. Signed: "Rowlandson Del".	"This composition is well drawn, and suggestive."		
	The Ghost of my Departed Husband, or Wither my Love ah! wither art thou gone	A churchyard. An ugly old woman, apparently in feat of the watchman who holds his lantern up before him, has fallen on her back; a ghostlike figure in a pointed cap lies flat on the ground under the old dame's rump, and appears to be naked. Signed: "Rowlandson scul."	"The only indecency is the entire nudity of the woman's legs, which are up in the air."		
	The Discovery	A fat old man with a poker in his right hand, has discovered a young man and woman flagrante delicto; the youth, in his shirt, is on his knees before him, while the girl is seated on the bed weeping; she has a night cap on, but her breasts and legs are fully exposed. Signed: "Published Jan 1809. Rowlandson 1798".	"This is a nicely drawn and well finished piece."		
	Washing Trotters	Interior of a poorly furnished room. An ugly man and a pretty young woman are seated facing each other, she on a bed, he on a stool, and have their feet in the same tub; the girl's clothes are up above her hips, and the man is eagerly regarding her genitals thus liberally exposed to his gaze. A song "The Black Joke" hangs on the wall. Signed: "Rowlandson del", and outside the design: "Published by Hixon. 355. near Exeter change Strand Jan. 20. 1800."	"The drawing of this composition is good, and the finish, especially of the girl's legs and haunches, fine."		
	Work for Doctors-Common	Interior. Two men from behind a screen are watching a couple on a sofa kissing each other, the woman seated on the man; a fire is burning, and a guitar and music lie on the floor. It is signed "Pub^{d} by T Rowlandson Strand Feby 1792."	"This pretty plate, which represents General Upton and Mrs. Walsh, is well drawn and finely engraved, it is suggestive and somewhat free, but not indecent." This identification of the two subjects is questioned by the British Museum: "General Upton … looks too young to be a general, nor was there a general of this name in the Army List at this date."		
	Opening the Sluces or Hollan^{d}s [sic] last Shift (Note: Now attributed to Isaac Cruikshank.)	Some dozen fat women, their hinder or lower parts bare, are squatting on the shore, and making water into the sea; while a stout man is supplying them with gin from a bottle which he holds under his arm; he is also urinating. Some soldiers are in the sea up to their middles in the water. "Pub^{d} Oct 24 1794 by J Adken No 14 Castle St Leicester Sqr".	"The drawing of this caricature is generally poor, although the second woman is not bad, and the execution very rough; the piece seems to have been done in a hurry."		
	Rural Sports. Or a pleasant way of making hay	In a hay-field two youths and three wenches are romping on the ground, while a fourth girl is about to throw some hay upon them. In the background three women and a man are loading a waggon. Signed "Rowlandson Del".	"The positions of the figures on the ground are suggestive, but scarcely indecent." Titled by Von Meier: "Country Frolic".		
	A View on the Banks of the Thames	Two women, the one old, the other young and pretty, are walking away from a river in which several naked men are bathing; they both however look back over their shoulders at the sight which is evidently attractive to them, and the elder female exclaims: "Oh shame on the Nasty fellows do Sophia tell me when we are past them". Signed: "Rowlandson inv".	"This and the four following numbers were published by Thos. Tegg in Cheapside, and sold at one shilling coloured."		
	Off She Goes (Note: Now attributed to Thomas Rowlandson, after George Murgatroyd Woodward.)	Exterior. A very fat woman, in the act of eloping with a military gentleman, has fallen off the ladder placed against the window, and of which a stale is broken, and lies sprawling on the top of her lover. An old man in night cap puts his head and a lighted candle out of the window. The post-boy, standing by the post-chaise, is laughing at the catastrophe; and a dog is barking. Signed: "Thos. Tegg Rowlandson scul".			
	Neighbourly Refreshment	Exterior of a double house. A young man and woman are leaning out of two half-open doors, and kissing each other; the young man is hanging up a bird-cage with his right hand, while his left hand is on the girl's breast; an old man stands behind the girl, and an old woman behind the youth. A dog is springing on a cock in the act of treading a hen; while a frightened cat is clambering up one of the half-open doors. Signed: "Rowlandson, 1815.” No. 235 of the Tegg series.	"This composition is by no means obscene, but only suggestive; all the figures are fully clothed. The execution is rough, but not devoid of force and spirit." Captioned by Schiff: "Sympathy I"		
	A Spanish Cloak	On a rampart, a sentinel is enjoying a young woman whom he covers with his cloak, but whose legs are visible up to the knee; they are in a standing posture. An old officer comes round the corner and surprises them. Signed: "Rowlandson Del". No. 139 of the Tegg series.	"The execution is rough, but the caricature is spirited."		
	Puss in Boots. Or General Junot taken by surprise	In a tent, a young, chubby girl, dressed in a hat and feather and high boots, brandishes a drawn sword in her right hand, and strutts about; with her left hand she holds up her clothes so that her naked legs are visible above the tops of the boots. A man in bed clutches his breeches, and appears to be calling for aid. In the foreground left is a badly drawn dog or cat. Signed: "Rowlandson Del". No. 71 of the Tegg series.	"Execution very rough."	(Note: Here ends the list of etchings described by Ashbee 1879.)	
	————	No title. Interior. A pretty girl with flowing hair, and entirely naked with exception of stockings and shoes, is reclining on her right elbow under a canopy. Her posteriors of abnormal development, are exposed in such wise that her pudendum is visible. A man, in the back ground, of whose presence she seems to be aware, draws back the curtain and observes her.			
	Touch for Touch or a female Physician in full practice		Coloured etching after Rowlandson, possibly plagiarising the similar etching earlier noticed.		
	————	A young woman reclines on a bed at left with her skirts drawn up about her waist and her right leg raised, displaying her pudendum to the gaze of the aroused young man who reclines opposite with her left leg across his lap; an old crone is opening a door at right to spy on them.	The second etching shown (left) is after or in the style of Rowlandson.		
	The Fair Bather		After François Boucher.		
	Ride to Rumford				
	Smuggling Out, or Starting for Gretna Green				
	Love in a Tub or A Cure for a Cold				
	Royal Academy. Somerset House London				
	R.A.'s of Genius Reflecting on the True Line of Beauty, at the Life Academy Somerset House				
	An Amorous Turk				
	A Mahomedan Mouse Trap				
	Kitty Careless in Quod or Waiting for Jew Bail				
	Looking at the Comet till You Get a Crick in the Neck				
	Hocus Pocus, or Searching for the Philosopher's Stone				
	Bachelor's Fare, Bread, Cheese, and Kisses				
	Broad Grins, or a Black Joke	A plump, heavily pregnant woman stands and smirks, looking down at her obvious state, while the aged clergyman who stands beside her recoils in disgust. They are before a high brick wall with leafy trees behind it, and through a chink in the wall a black man spies on the pair with a diabolical look.			
	None But the Brave Deserve the Fair	An attractive young woman descends from the wall of a grand house, which she has climbed, into the outstretched arms of a uniformed hussar who stands astride his steed, ready to receive her embrace. The girl's white dress shows much décolletage.	See Alexander's Feast.		
	School for Gallantry		This was the fifth print of a group of eight. Rousseau's "Eloise" (Julie; or, the New Heloise) lies open on the floor.		
	Soldiers on a March		See watercolour below.		
	Defrauding the Customs, or Shipping the Goods Not Fairly Entered				
	————		Titled by Von Meier: "British Goods at Auction".		
	————		Titled by Von Meier: "Flirtation Class".		
	The Man of Feeling		See Henry Mackenzie, The Man of Feeling and John Wilkes, Essay on Woman.		
	Grand Review of the Windsor Camp		Perhaps based on rumoured relations between Princess Sophia and Thomas Garth in the summer of 1800.		
	Exhibition Stare Case		See Somerset House.		
	Preparations for a Birthday		Titled by Von Meier: "Birthday Preparations".		
	Inn Yard on Fire		Titled by Von Meier: "Fire at the Inn".		
	Rural Sports. Smock Racing				
	Dying for Love, or Captain Careless, Shot Flying by a Girl of Fifteen who Unexpectedly Popped Her Head out of a Casement				
	After Dinner				
	La Fille Mal Gardé, or Jack in the Box		See La fille mal gardée.		
	A Milk Sop				
	Jack Tar admiring the Fair Sex		Titled by Von Meier: "Jack Tar Makes His Choice".		
	Sea Stores				
	Progress of Gallantry, or Stolen Kisses Sweetest				
	A Man of Feeling		Titled by Von Meier: "The Scholar at His Ease"; by Schiff: "The Happy Parson".		
	Hocus Pocus, or Searching for the Philsopher's Stone				
	————		Titled by Schiff: "College Refreshment".		
			Titled by Schiff: "Love on a Bicycle".		
	Helpless Desire [original called Fumble Cunt]				
			Titled by Von Meier: "Retribution"; by Schiff: "The Fort".		
	A Medical Inspection. or Miracles Wll Never Cease		Titled by Von Meier: "Seeing is Believing". See Joanna Southcott.		
	Miseries of Bathing				
	Modern Antiques		See also Ancient Egypt in the Western imagination.		
	The Sculptor		See also Joseph Nollekens.		
	———— [Love in the East]				
	Quaker in Love				
	Road to Ruin [Prodigal Son]				
	Rural Sports or a Cricket Match Extraordinary		See History of women's cricket.		
	Ladies Trading on Their Own Bottom				
	A Maiden Aunt Smelling Fire				
	The First Night of My Wedding, or Little Boney No Match For an Arch Dutchess				
	[Bedroom Scene]		Also titled "A Bed-warmer"		
	Intrusion on Study or The Painter Disturbed				
	————	Cut down and title lost, but inscribed on the verso in a contemporary hand: "Brace of Ab.Newlands. Hixon. 1799".	"Abraham Newlands" was slang for bank-notes. See also Prostitution in the UK and Courtesan.		
	————	Lettering: "Venus's Bathing. (Margate.) A fashionable Dip."	See Margate, Kent.		
	————	Lettering: "Venus's Bathing. (Margate). Side Way or any Way."			
	Summer Amusement at Margate, or a Peep at the Mermaids				
	Salt Water and Fresh Water				
	Rural Sports, or How to Show Off a Well Shaped Leg				
	[Girl with a Basket and Birdcage Adjusting Her Garter]				
	————		Hand-coloured etching with stipple, after Poussin. See also the pose of the Sleeping Hermaphroditus. Titled by Paulson: "Satyr and Nymph".		
	[Mars and Sleeping Venus with Putti]		After Poussin.		
	[Fortuna with a Purse]		After Guido Reni.		
	[Sleeping Venus and Love]				
	[Sleeping Venus Cuddling a Child]				
	[Two Nymphs Bathing, One Washing the Other's Foot]				
	[Ariadne on Naxos Approached by Bacchus]				
	[A Nymph Drying Herself]				
	[Three Nymphs Bathing]				
	[Venus and Cupid]				
	Tom Jones Rescues Mrs Waters from the Violence of Northerton		See Tom Jones, a Foundling.		
	[Lady Booby Attempts to Seduce the Immaculate Joseph]		See Joseph Andrews.		
	[Joseph Hastens to Rescue Fanny from Imminent Danger]				
	Special Pleading				

=== Pretty Little Games ===
Pretty Little Games for Young Ladies & Gentlemen. With Pictures of Good Old English Sports and Pastimes was published by John Camden Hotten in 1845 (1872) as a small quarto containing ten plates and accompanying verses by Rowlandson, who was by then long deceased.

The object of this volume was to reproduce, in form of a book, ten erotic plates by Thomas Rowlandson, which had been issued separately, about 1800; each plate is accompanied by a sheet of letter press from the pen of Hotten, and under each are a title and a few doggerel lines, etched, probably the production of either Rowlandson or Hotten.

Image	Title	Description	Commentary	Notes
	The Willing Fair, or any Way to Please	An interior, with view of a garden through an open casement. A young man is seated on an easy chair with a plump girl, almost naked, astride his legs; they are kissing, and in the act. On the floor, to the right, are a basin and ewer, and to the left in back ground a dog is stealing from a plate on the table. The verses underneath describe the action.		
	The Country Squire new Mounted	An interior, two tables and two chairs, with an erotic picture hanging on the wall at back. Two figures, a man and a woman; the lady, who is almost naked, has a feather in her hair, her pudendum is placed unnaturally high up; the squire has on a dress coat, and his breeches are at his knees; his hat is on the ground to the right.		
	The Hairy Prospect or the Devil in a Fright	Interior, a bed to the left, and an open door to the right. A young girl holds up her shift, the only garment she is wearing, above her navel; Satan is gazing at her in astonishment and fright; both figures are standing; the Devil has horns, wings, and a well developed penis, which is peculiar in form, but not erect.		
	The Larking Cull	A bed room; toilet table to the left, looking-glass hanging on the wall to the right, a pot of flowers on a small table at the back. Two figures; the youth's member is very large, and unnaturally tapered at the end, a form particularly affected by Rowlandson. Pleasure is depicted on the faces of both the actors.		
	The Toss Off	An old Jew dressed, and with his hat on, supports himself with his left hand on the back of a chair, whilst with his right he raises the clothes of a young and particularly plump girl. A mirror placed to the left, on which the Jew is earnestly gazing, reflects the girl's posteriors, her breasts are also bare. To the right, on the ground, is a hurdy-gurdy, and on the back wall hangs a picture representing a "View of the City of Jerusalem", and the "Temple of Solomon". The man's member is unusually large and tapered at the end.	Titled by Schiff: "The Jew".	
	New Feats of Horsemanship	An open country. A man dressed, and in a hunting cap, on horse-back, has a girl, whose posteriors and legs are entirely exposed, on the pommel of the saddle before him; she clasps the horse's neck; they are in the act.	"The horse, which is galloping, is very badly drawn, and the dog running by its side still worse. The woman's face is badly drawn, but her naked parts are well designed, and boldly and vigorously carried out. The whole thing is quite impossible, but in spite of this and of the clumsy drawing of the horse, &c., the picture possesses much life and movement." Titled by Schiff: "The Gallop".	
	Rural Felicity or Love in a Chaise	A woman, seated in a chaise, her clothes about her waist, her arms bare, with a bonnet on embellished by a large feather, holds the reins in her left hand, and brandishes a whip in her right; whilst a young man, whose countenance expresses great eagerness, with his breeches at his heels, kneels between her uplifted legs, and copulates with her.	"This is a pendant to the design immediately above noticed. The horse is as extravagantly drawn, and the posture almost as impossible."	
	The Sanctified Sinner	A meanly furnished room, with a small window at the back, into which an ugly old man is peeping. On a low bed is seated a naked girl; and between her legs stands an old man, dressed in a hat and long cloak, with his breeches down. The girl with her left hand clasps the old man round the buttocks, and with her right handles his member, which is unnaturally large, and its shape quite typical of Rowlandson's style; the girl is bald about her parts. In the foreground left, is a broken candle in a candle-stick, and an open volume, on which is inscribed "The Hippocrite display'd", and "Crazy Tales".	"Both man and woman are well drawn."	
	The Wanton Frolic	A well furnished room. An almost naked girl lies on the floor on her back, with her legs in the air. A youth, dressed, kneels on one knee before her; in his left hand he holds his large, stiff member, while he clasps the girl's left ankle with his right hand.	"The drawing of the female figure is very defective."	
	The Curious Wanton	A bed room. One girl is partially reclining on a bed, while another, on one knee, is holding a mirror to her; both have bare arms, and their shifts are above their waists. A dog jumps up against the bed, and is apparently barking at his mistress; an ewer and basin are placed on the floor in the immediate foreground.		

== Drawings and watercolours ==
The nude and erotic drawings of Rowlandson are very numerous. The following is a small selection.

Image	Title	Description	Commentary	Notes
	————	A nude girl reclines on drapery spread under a tree; a tambourine, which she holds with her right hand, is beneath her head. Two naked children, one kneeling and playing a flute, the other, winged, is dancing and playing on a pipe and a tambourine.	"A pretty sketch, correctly drawn and with much life; slightly tinted; the treatment is classical."	
	————	Interior. Fourteen figures in couples round a table; to the right, the president, a glass in his left and a bottle in his right hand, is having connection with a woman astride across his lap, and leaning with her elbows on the table; to the left, a man is vomiting, while a drunken woman is lying upon him and handling his member; the other couples are in various obscene attitudes; all the women have their breasts and the lower parts of their persons bare. Slightly tinted.	This subject is similar in conception to Lord Barr**res Great Bottle Club.	
	The Road to Ruin	Title in Rowlandson's hand-writing. Interior. A young squire is seated at a round table with his mistress, whose breasts are naked; he has his left leg across her lap; both have glasses in their hands. On the other side is a captain dealing out a pack of cards, and intent on business. Between these, in the centre, is a fat, sensual-looking, old chaplain, occupied in the simultaneous emptying of two bottles of wine into a capacious punch-bowl. By these gambling, wine and women are indicated.	Ashbee quotes the opinion of a previous possessor of this drawing, who pronounced it to be "broad and forcible beyond description, and finer than Hogarth."	
	————	An old bawd is exhibiting the body of a young, and innocent-looking girl to an antiquated debauchee, who is peering at the naked breasts of the maiden through an eye-glass.		
	————	Five firemen are at work endeavouring to quench the flames which are consuming a house, out of which a very fat, old woman is escaping; she carries off some household objects held together in her shift, which she holds up above her waist, thereby entirely exposing the lower part of her person. The firemen are watching her with expressions of lewdness, and they hold their hose in very equivocal positions.	"The whole composition is full of force and spirit."	
		Subject Leda and the swan. In the background another swan is pursuing a naked woman.	"A very pleasant composition."	
		A youth and a maiden are reclining on a bank; he has his right hand upon her clothes.	"The drawing is good; the composition is not indecent, but suggestive only."	
	Cricket Match at the 3 Hats, Islington	The match is played by naked women of all shapes and sizes, who are putting forth their energies in the most vigorous and comical manner.	"This composition, full of life and humour, is entirely in the style of the great artist."	(Note: Here ends the list of drawings described by Ashbee.)
	Exhibition Stare-Case		See Somerset House.	
	The Elopement			
	The Actresses Dressing Room at Drury Lane			
	[Female Dancer with a Tambourine]			
	Nancy Cock Clear Starcher			
	[Diana and Her Nymphs Bathing]			
	[Venus, Anchises and Cupid]			
	[Venus Crowned by Cupid]			
	[Nude Couple Embracing]			
	[Nude Couple Embracing]			
	The Beauty and the Beast			
	Nymphs at a Roman Bath			
	[Preparation for the Academy—Old Joseph Nollekens and his Venus]			
	[The Life Class]			
	[Running Female Nude]			
	[Nude Figure, a Dagger in the Heart]			
	[Vine Pattern With Satyr Family]		After Sebald Beham.	
	[Diana and Actaeon]			
	[Leda and the Swan]			
	[Rape of Lucrece]			
	Old Roué and Sleeping Girl			
	A Varsity Trick (Smuggling In)			
	A Milksop			
	The Swing (Rural Sports, or How to Show Off a Well Shaped Leg)			
	Soldiers on a March	Titled in black ink, lower left: "Sᴏʟᴅɪᴇʀs ᴏɴ ᴀ Mᴀʀᴄʜ"; signed and dated, lower right: "Rowlandson 1805"; inscribed on the verso, in graphite, lower centre: "Soldiers and their baggage finding a river then they pack up their tatters and follow the drum".		
	New Shoes			
	————	Lovers in a wooded landscape. Pencil, pen and black ink and watercolour, unframed.		
	————			
	[Master & Maid in Congress]			
	[The Parson and the Milkmaids]			
	————			
	————			
	————			
	The Larking Cull			
	[The Judgement of Paris]			
	[The Secret Toilet]			
	[The Inspection]			

== See also ==
- List of erotica by George Morland, William Ward and John Raphael Smith
- History of erotic depictions
- Erotic art

== Sources ==
- Baskett, John; Snelgrove, Dudley (1978). The Drawings of Thomas Rowlandson in the Paul Mellon Collection. New York: The Brandywine Press.
- Grego, Joseph (1880). Rowlandson the Caricaturist: A Selection from His Works. Vol. 2. London: Chatto and Windus. pp. 216, 412.
- Mellby, Julie L. (26 February 2010). "Lascivious Old Men or Art Historians?". Graphic Arts. Princeton University Library.
- Mudge, Bradford K. (2000). The Whore's Story: Women, Pornography, and the British Novel, 1684–1830. New York: Oxford University Press. pp. viii–xii, 111–17, 170, 195, 234–42.
- Paulson, Ronald (1972). Rowlandson: A New Interpretation. New York: Oxford University Press. pp. 22, 37, 84.
- Rowlandson, Thomas (1872) [1845]. Pretty Little Games for Young Ladies & Gentlemen. With Pictures of Good Old English Sports and Pastimes … A Few Copies Only Printed for the Artist's Friends. London: John Camden Hotten.
- Schiff, Gert, ed. (1969). The Amorous Illustrations of Thomas Rowlandson. United States: The Cythera Press.
- Smith, Bradley (1974). Erotic Art of the Masters: The 18th, 19th & 20th Centuries. Italy: Lyle Stuart, Inc. and Gemini-Smith, Inc. pp. 16–20.
- Thompson, James (1996). "Beauties in the Eyehole: The Voyeur's View of Ingres's Turkish Bath". Picturing the Middle East, A Hundred Years of European Orientalism: A Symposium. New York: Dahesh Museum. pp. 69–71.
- Von Meier, Kurt (1970). The Forbidden Erotica of Thomas Rowlandson. Los Angeles: The Hogarth Guild.
- Von Meier, Kurt (13 August 2017) [1970]. "The Forbidden Erotica of Thomas Rowlandson 1756–1827". Kurt von Meier.
