= Contes et nouvelles en vers =

Collection of stories by Jean de La Fontaine

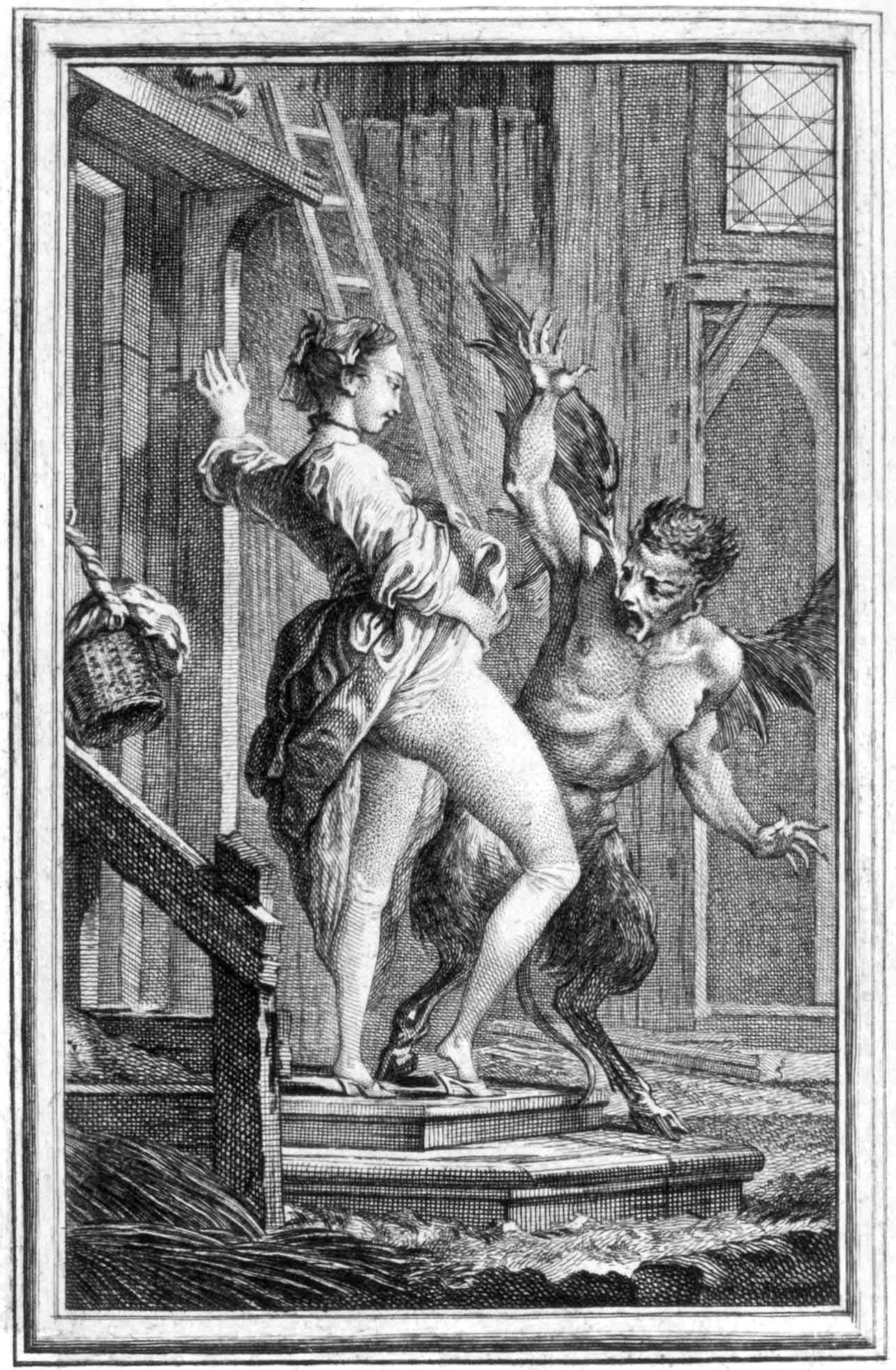
- Illustration by Charles Eisen for the poem "The Devil of Pope-Fig Island"
- Author: Jean de La Fontaine
- Language: French
- Genre: Ribaldry
- Publisher: Claude Barbin
- Publication date: 1665
- Publication place: France
- English publication date: 1735
- Media type: Print
- Pages: 94
- OCLC: 458206970
- Preceded by: Parution des deux premiers contes: Joconde, et Le cocu battu et content
- Followed by: 3 contes: Les frères de Catalogne, l'Ermite et Mazet de Lamporechio

Contes et nouvelles en vers (English: Tales and Novellas in Verse) is an anthology of various ribald short stories and novellas collected and versified from prose by Jean de La Fontaine. Claude Barbin of Paris published the collection in 1665.

La Fontaine drew from several French and Italian works of the 15th and 16th centuries, among them The Decameron of Giovanni Boccaccio, Ludovico Ariosto's Orlando Furioso, Antoine de la Sale's collection Cent Nouvelles Nouvelles, and the work of Bonaventure des Périers.

== Contents ==
Book 1

1. "Joconde", Orlando Furioso XXVIII, 4ff
2. "Le Cocu batu, et content", Decameron VII.7
3. "Le Mari confesseur"
4. "Le Savetier"
5. "La Paysan"
6. "Le Muletier"
7. "La Servante justifie'e"
8. "La Gageure des trois commeres", Decameron VII.8 and VII.9 (with some modifications)
9. "Le Calendrier des vieillards"
10. "A femme avare galant escroc"
11. "On ne s'avise jamais de tout"
12. "Le gascon puni"
13. "La Fiancée du roi de garbe"
14. "La Coupe enchante'e"
15. "Le Faucon"
16. "Le Petit chien"
17. "Paté d'anguille"
18. "Le Magnifique"
19. "La Matrone d'ephese"
20. "Belphegor"
21. "La Clochette"
22. "Le Glouton"
23. "Les Deux Amis"
24. "Le Juge de Mesle"
25. "Alis Malade"
26. "Le Baiser Rendu"
27. "Soeur Jeanne"
28. "Imitation d'Anacreon"
29. "L'Amour mouille"
30. "Les Oies de frère Philippe"
31. "Richard Minutolo"
32. "Les cordeliers de Catalogne"
33. "Le Villageois qui cherche son veau"

Book 2

1. "Le Berceau"
2. "L'oraison de Saint Julien"
3. "L'Anneau d"ahns Carvel"
4. "L'ermite"
5. "Mazet de Lamporechio"
6. "La mandragore"
7. "Les remois"
8. "La courtisane amoureuse"
9. "Nicaise"
10. "Comment l'esprit vient aux filles"
11. "L'abbesse malade"
12. "Le troquers"
13. "Le cas de conscience"
14. "Le diable de Papefiguiere"
15. "Feronde ou le purgatoire"
16. "Le psautier"
17. "Le roi Candaule et le maitre en droit"
18. "Les lunettes"
19. "Le cuvier"
20. "La chose impossible"
21. "Le tableau"
22. "Le Bat"
23. "Le faiseur d'oreilles et le raccommodeur de moules"
24. "Le fleuve Scamandre"
25. "La confidente sans le savoir ou le stratageme"
26. "Le remede"
27. "Les aveux indiscrets"
28. "Le contrat"
29. "Les quiproquo"
30. "La couturiere"
31. "Le gascon"
32. "La cruche"
33. "Promettre est un et tenir est un autre"
34. "Le rossignol"

== See also ==
- 15th century in literature
- 16th century in literature
- 17th century in poetry
- 17th-century French literature
