= La Farce de maître Pathelin =

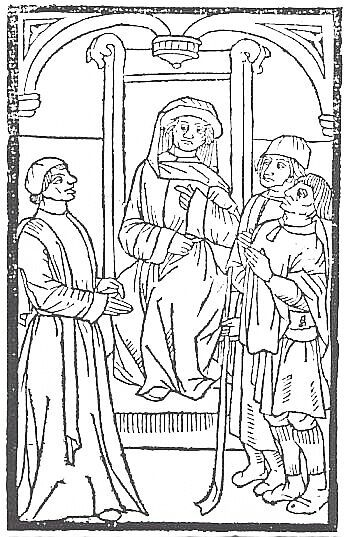
- Illustration of the trial scene
- Original language: Middle French
- Written by: Anonymous
- Characters: Pierre Pathelin; Guillemette Pathelin; Guillaume Joceaulme; Thibault l’Aignelet; Judge
- Genre: Farce
- Setting: Market, Pierre's home, and a courtroom

Premiere
- Date: Unknown (c. 1440)
- Place: France

La Farce de maître Pathelin (in English The Farce of Master Pathelin; sometimes La Farce de maître Pierre Pathelin, La Farce de Pathelin, Farce Maître Pierre Pathelin, or Farce de Maître Pathelin) is a 15th century French farce of disputed origin. The earliest accounts of this play can be traced back to as early as 1457 to 1470, with the 1st printed edition (published anonymously) dated to 1485; However the date is uncertain as there is no known playwright. It is sometimes attributed to Guillaume Alexis, and even to François Villon. According to the medievalist Bruno Roy, the most likely author is Triboulet, the jester and comedy playwright of René of Anjou.

The Farce of Master Pathelin was extraordinarily popular in its day, and held an influence on popular theatre for over a century. Its echoes can be seen in the works of Rabelais. A number of phrases from the play became proverbs in French, and the phrase "Let us return to our muttons" (revenons à nos moutons) even became a common English calque.

In the play there are only five characters: the title character, his wife Guillemette, a clothier named Guillaume Joceaulme, a shepherd named Thibault l’Aignelet, and finally a judge. Every character except the last is dishonest in some way, which is exploited to great effect.

The play focuses on issues including the complex emerging state structure and honesty. The play also zeros in on the theme of the deceiver being deceived. In total, it can be performed in approximately one hour.

== Historical relevancy ==
Medieval farce came after a large swell in other types of drama, which included a lengthening of the plays, particularly mystères. Comedy was not directly influenced by this, but it is possible that the quick humor and shorter play styles were a counter to this dramatic style.

The Feast of Fools was a medieval feast day on 1 January that the clergy in southern France started. The Feast of Fools later spread to other countries, and it consisted of plays of different sorts acted by secular guilds, called sociétés joyeuses, roughly meaning “company of fools," and other times known as confréries, which means "brotherhood." The church did not endorse the Feast of Fools, the largest reason being that one of the four types of popular farces at the time was a direct mockery of religious sermons. This style of farce, known as sermons joyeaux, was a parody of Sunday sermons. Other types were the sottie, which was a sharper satire that made a point about a political topic, sometimes venturing into a social or religious topic, and a moralité, which was geared more toward teaching about a topic. The last style was plain farce, which had more to do with everyday situations, but could include elements of the others, especially sotties.

A leading reason in the quick spread of French farce was the relatability. References to religion and politics were accessible to everybody, and the debate about the moral views depicted in farce continues to this day.

== Plot summary ==
Master Pierre Pathelin is a local village lawyer with no professional, formal training who has very little work, due to the emerging class of professionally trained clerks and lawyers. In order to obtain cloth to replace his and his wife's holey clothing, he visits the clothier Guillaume Joceaulme. By flattering him, Pathelin convinces the clothier — against his better judgment — to let him have six yards of fine cloth on credit. However, he promises Joceaulme that he can visit his house that day to be paid.

When Pathelin arrives home he tells his wife Guillemette that the clothier is due to arrive home and to pretend that Pathelin has been sick in bed for almost three months. After some humorous arguments, Joceaulme barges in on Pathelin, who is in bed and raving like a madman. In time Pathelin's entertaining babble moves from one French dialect to another, which Guillemette has to explain away.

After Joceaulme gives up on attempting to retrieve his payment, he turns his thoughts to his shepherd, Thibault l’Aignelet, who has been stealing Joceaulme's sheep and eating them for the past three years. Joceaulme summons Aignelet to court, and the latter goes to Pathelin in order to be legally represented. Pathelin directs Aignelet to say only "Baaa" (like a sheep) when anyone questions him in court in the hope that the judge will find Joceaulme's case groundless, as it will appear that he has taken a mentally-challenged person to court.

At the trial Joceaulme instantly recognizes Pathelin. He tries to explain the details of both cases (the stolen cloth and the stolen sheep) to the judge, but he is unable to do so clearly, and the judge conflates the two cases. Because of Joceaulme's incoherent case against the shepherd (and the latter's one word nonsense response of "Baaa"), the judge rules against him. Pathelin attempts to collect his fee from Aignelet, but the latter only answers Pathelin's demands with "Baaa." Pathelin realizes that his brilliant defense is now being used against him, and he goes home.

== Pathelin and deception in French Farce ==
Unlike other play genres in the early 12th to 16th centuries, French farces like Pierre Pathelin were made to highlight the problems in humanity that made society imperfect. Instead of following a structure of the virtuous hero and the vicious villain, French farce would instead take the side of the person who was the most clever. As History of Theatre states it, “The clever man, even if a sinner, is usually the hero; the dupes deserve their fates because they are stupid or gullible”.

La Farce de Maitre Pierre Pathelin has been known to have a great impact on plays of the past and present. It was ahead of its time; keeping the comedic vigor of many other plays, while also introducing some unseen tactics into farce itself. In Donald Maddox's The Morality of Mischief, Maddox uses ideas brought by 16th century scholars like Henri Estienne to describe how Pierre Pathelin managed to acquire such success both now and in its time. One major idea used to describe the way Pierre Pathelin was created was the idea that every character in it had a “fiduciary contract” between one another that gave a symbol of trust between characters. However, if delusion occurred in the play between characters, the contract would become null and void; this delusion would stem from a second idea of the deceiver being deceived. “The identification of iterative surface manifestations of deception reinforces the postulation of a deep structure organized by the axis of Delusion and strengthens the hypothesis that deceit is in fact the organizing principle of the entire play”. French farce is based solely off of trust and deceitfulness that are influenced by ideas brought from La Farce de Maitre Pierre Pathelin.

== See also ==
- Medieval French literature
- Medieval theatre
- Jacopo Foroni

== Sources ==
- Brockett, Oscar Gross; Hildy, Franklin J. (2013). History of the Theatre. Pearson. ISBN 978-1-292-02515-5.
- Maddox, Donald (1978). "The Morphology of Mischief in "Maistre Pierre Pathelin"". L'Esprit Créateur. 18 (3): 55–68. ISSN 0014-0767. JSTOR 26280807.
- Elliot, Samuel A. Little Theater Classics. Vol. 2 Little, Brown, and Company, 1920.
