= List of erotica by George Morland, William Ward and John Raphael Smith =

The art of erotic illustration in 18th century England was less developed than in France and the Italian states. However, some work of varying quality was produced in England, notably by Thomas Rowlandson. The following is a list of erotic illustrations of scenes from popular novels, designed probably by George Morland, and engraved by his brother-in-law, William Ward, or by John Raphael Smith, which are described by Henry Spencer Ashbee ('Pisanus Fraxi') in Catena Librorum Tacendorum (1885), the third and final volume of his bibliography of curious and uncommon books.

#	Image	Title	Description	Notes
1 (Note: The following five mezzotints, with eight others, are noticed at p. 48 of Le Bibliophile Fantaisiste.)		Fanny Hill and Phœbe.	The two girls are on the bed together, their shifts turned up to their waists. Phoebe has her left hand on Fanny’s private parts. A table, with a lighted candle, on the right.	
2		M^{rs}. Brown, the Horse Grenadier, and Fanny Hill.	Fanny is peeping through a glass door at fat Mrs. Brown, who is enjoying the vigorous attack of her soldier. Fanny has her left hand on her own private parts.	
3		Fanny Hill, Louisa, and the Nosegay Boy.	The boy is having connection with one of the girls upon a bed, while the second girl, fully dressed, seated at the foot of the bed, is feeling his testicles. A basket of flowers in the foreground, and a birch on a chair to the right.	
4		Harriet ravish'd in the Summer House.	Harriet reclines on a wooden bench with arms, her clothes above her waist, while a naked man stands between her legs, and is having connection with her.	
4A			The same subject, without any title. There are very slight differences in the hair of both figures, in the drapery of the woman, in the panels of the room, &c. One plate, however, must have been copied from the other. That without title seems to be the older.	
5		Harriet and the Barronet. [sic]	A naked couple are copulating on a couch, while two other pairs, fully dressed, stand behind the couch and observe them.	
5A			The same subject, same grouping, plate a trifle smaller, with the following slight variations, viz: the man operating on the sofa has a shirt on, one of the women behind the sofa has her clothes pulled up above her waist; the sofa, hair, and head dresses differ, and in this plate there is an armchair to the right, and a man's hat and boot to the left in the foreground, which are not given in the plate immediately above described.	
*		Mrs Homespun and Sedley. Pupil of Pleasure.	On an old-fashioned four-post bedstead Harriet reclines with her right leg raised, her breasts exposed; Sedley is placing himself upon her; with her right hand she pats his cheek, with her left directs his member.	Illustrating The Pupil of Pleasure. This obscene mezzotint was designed probably by GEORGE MORLAND, and engraved by W. WARD, subscribed, outside the design, Mrs Homespun and Sedley. Pupil of Pleasure.
*		Emily Palmer (afterwards Countess de Barre) & M^{r}. de C.——.	Emily reclines on a couch, one foot touching the floor, her breasts and legs exposed; with her right hand she endeavours to keep from her the member of Mr. de C——, who kneels on the couch between her legs.	Emily's seduction in the Memoirs of the Countess de Barre has inspired the artist, probably George Morland, of this mezzotint, entitled, outside the design, Emily Palmer (afterwards Countess de Barre) & M^{r}. de C.——. The incident occurs at p. 128, which, together with a quotation of three lines, is given on the plate.
1 (Note: The following ten mezzotints seem to have been done at the same time as those already noted, and are probably by the same artists, viz. George Morland and John Raphael Smith.)		Tom Jones and Molly Seagrim in the Grove.	Molly is on her back on the grass under a tree, and Tom lying upon her; Thwackum and Square are looking on in astonishment, and in the distance; Sophia Weston, assisted by the Squire, is crossing a stile.	
2		Tom Jones, Molly Seagrim, and Square.	Tom and Molly are on the bed together, in the act; Square, in his shirt, and holding his limp member in his left hand, surprises them. There is a dog in the foreground.	
3		Tom Jones & Mrs. Waters at the Inn at Upton after the Battle— Tom Jones, Book IX, Chap. V.	Mrs. Waters reclines in an arm chair, her clothes up to her waist, while Jones, in top boots, but with his breeches down, stands between her legs and enjoys her.	
4		Lady Bellaston & Tom Jones after their return from the Masquerade, Tom Jones book 13 Chap^{t}. 7.	Jones is on his back on the bed, while Lady Bellaston, her posteriors entirely exposed, lies upon him.	
5		La Fleur taking leave of his Sweethearts.	La Fleur is lying on one girl on the bed, and is operating with vigour; a second girl, seated on a chair, with her clothes up, watches them, and consoles herself with her right hand, while with her left she supports her head. Yorick is peeping in at the window.	
6		Rousseau & Madam de Warens, Rousseau's Confessions.	Rousseau sits on a chair, his breeches down, while Mme. de Warens, her clothes above her rump, stands across him. They are in the act. An oval mirror on the wall at back reflects the lady’s face.	
7		St. Preux and Eloisa. I feel—I feel you are a thousand times more dear to me than ever—O my charming Mistress! my Wife! my Sister! my friend! By what name shall I express what I feel Eloisa Vol. I Page 183.	St. Preux is lying upon Eloisa on a bed, and operating vigorously; both are naked to the waist.	
8		Mock Husband.	Two girls, with their clothes drawn up above their waists, are on a couch, the one with a dildo fastened round her is acting the man’s part, a third girl fully dressed and standing behind the sofa, is applying the birch to the posteriors of the girl who is uppermost. Signed J. R. SMITH Fecit.	
9		The Nobleman's Wife and the Taylor Crazy Tale.	A very fat man is strenuously exerting himself, apparently in vain, to have connexion with a woman who lies on her back on the bed; he has his breeches about his heels, and her clothes are well up above her middle. The lady seems to favour to the utmost the fruitless exertions of her stout admirer.	
10		The Female Contest; or, my Cunt's larger than thine!	Five young women, in various postures, are exposing their persons, while a sixth woman is examining them; she has her breasts bare, and stands behind a long, narrow table covered with a white cloth which runs across the picture.	
1 (Note: The following ten mezzotints, unsigned and without titles, appear to be the work of J. R. Smith.)			Interior. On a couch, the foot of which rests on the ground, a nude youth and maiden are copulating in a natural manner. The design is filled in with drapery and classical details.	
2			Interior. A vigorous young man is sitting on the edge of a bed with a plump girl astride across his lap; he is entirely naked, while the upper part of her person is draped; her left leg reposes on the ground, while her right foot is on the bed. The drapery of the bed and accessories are classical, although a chamber-pot occupies the right corner of the picture.	
3			Interior. A girl, her legs and backside entirely exposed, kneels on a couch; her head rests on an enormous dildo which she holds in her right hand upon the pillow. A winged Cupid with his left hand inserts a stick or candle into the girl’s person, while with the fore finger of the right hand he tickles the adjacent hole.	
4			A nude female, her hair streaming down her back, sits on a bed; with her right hand she supports her head; her attitude and expression denote great grief. The bed is surrounded with drapery; the treatment is classical.	
5			Interior. A monk, whose legs and backside are bare, is having connection with a pretty young girl whom he has forced back upon a couch or bed; her left breast, person and legs are entirely exposed.	
6			Dutch Interior. A man with high hat, smoking a long pipe, which he holds in his right hand, is groping, with his left hand, under the petticoats of a woman, sitting on a chair close by, apparently asleep; her knees are bare.	
7			Interior. A naked woman, seated on a chair with a canopy, holds her left breast in her right hand, while with her left hand she points to a man, fully dressed, who, seated on a chair close by, is masturbating himself with his left hand underneath the woman’s left leg which is extended across his knees; with his right hand he touches her private parts. A window, to left of the design, affords a view into a garden with Cyprus trees.	
8			A young man, whose head is bare, but who is otherwise dressed and booted, is tickling with a bow, which he holds in his right hand, the private parts of a girl who sits on his left leg, with her right leg across his right leg; with his left hand he holds the girl’s petticoats up above her waist; on her left bare thigh is a piece of music; she wears a high head-dress. There is a table with a bottle and a wine-glass, and a violoncello. To the right of the picture a little girl holds her petticoats above her middle, and pisses into the man’s hat.	
9			In a park, under a tree, a girl, with a high head dress, as in previous picture, is asleep; her clothes are raised above her middle, and her legs are wide apart, the left being stretched out, while the right is drawn close up to her buttock, her private parts are thus entirely exposed. She has a patch on her right cheek, and wears shoes with large bows.	
10			Interior. A man, seated on a chair, is undressing himself; a cat is playing with his member, which dangles from between his bare legs. A bed to the left, and a window to the right of the picture; a sword and a wig hang on the wall.	
1 (Note: The two following mezzotints, of a later date, and very inferior in drawing and execution to those already noticed, and certainly not by the same artists, appear to form a pair; they have no titles.)			A sitting room. A young girl is leaning out of a window, her elbows resting on the sill, and her clothes turned up, leaving her backside entirely bare, while a young man in tightly fitting pantaloons and Hessian boots, with his flap open, is having connection with her from behind. A curtain falls on the girl's back, and on the wall, to the right, hangs a picture representing Leda and the Swan.	The young man is said to be George IV, when Prince of Wales.
2			A bed room. A young man, in his shirt only, is seated on a chair, while a young girl, entirely naked, kneels across his legs on the same chair; they are having connection and passing their tongues into each other's mouths. The background is filled up by a bed and a door, before which latter stands a table with a decanter and two wine-glasses.	"The engraving is poor and liney, and the faces are badly drawn."
1 (Note: The eight mezzotints which now follow are "well drawn, and carefully executed." From the costume and head dresses they appear to belong to the same period of the art, although they are not thought to be by the artists already mentioned.)			Interior. A man and woman are having connection on the edge of a bed or couch; the man stands on the floor, the woman reclines on the couch, with her legs extended above his back; they are kissing. The legs of the woman and person of the man are exposed. A boy kneels on one knee and watches the operation; he holds his hat in his left hand, whilst his right hand is raised in sign of astonishment.	
2			In a park, under a tree a young man and a girl are copulating on the grass; she holds a large book under her posteriors, and her legs are extended about the man’s back. Her breasts and buttocks as well as the man’s private parts are bare.	
3			Interior. A young man is enjoying a girl in the wheelbarrow fashion, i.e., she has her hands on the floor, while he supports her legs, one on each side of him; the girl’s posteriors and the man’s member are exposed. To the right of the picture is a sofa with a hat on it.	
4			Interior. An old man seated on a couch is caressing a girl, who leans backwards against him. He supports her with his left hand, whilst his right is on her breast. The girl has her hand on her own private parts, which are exposed, as well as her person above her navel.	
5			Interior. A man, whose erect member protrudes from his breeches, handles the private parts of a woman whom he is forcing back on a bed. She has her clothes above her middle and her right hand on the man’s head. The design is in an oval compartment and is filled in with drapery.	
6			In a wood, a naked couple are copulating in the following manner: the youth lies on the ground on his back, while the maiden, who holds on to the branch of a tree with both hands, sits upon his person. The design is enclosed in an oval compartment.	
7			Interior. On a couch without legs, a couple are copulating, the man above, the woman underneath; the man’s posteriors and the woman’s person are exposed. Much energy is displayed, but both drawing and engraving are bad.	
8			Interior. A naked girl reclines on a bed, while a man, fully dressed, points with his left hand to her well developed posteriors, and holds up his right hand in admiration. The back ground is filled in with drapery.	

== Sources ==
- Ashbee, Henry Spencer [Pisanus Fraxi] (1877). Index Librorum Prohibitorum. London: privately printed. pp. xviii–xix.
- Ashbee, Henry Spencer [Pisanus Fraxi] (1885). Catena Librorum Tacendorum. Notes on Curious and Uncommon Books. London: privately printed. pp. 83–5, 98, 102, 408–15.
- Catalogue des Livres Defendus par la Commission Impériale Et Royale. Brussels. 1786. p. 55.
