= Guillaume Alexis =

French Benedictine monk and poet

Guillaume Alexis (precise birth and death dates unknown) was a French Benedictine monk and poet of the late 15th and early 16th centuries, nicknamed the "Good Monk". His abbey was that at Lire (La Vieille-Lyre), in the diocese of Évreux, He became prior of Bussy, in Perche. In 1486 he went on a pilgrimage to Jerusalem and died there, a victim of Ottoman persecution.

== Works ==
Guillaume Alexis was a poet of a very live style, who literary critics rank with the successors of François Villon:

- Le Passe-temps de tout homme et de toute femme avec l'A, B, С des doubles (Paris, Antoine Vérard), in verse, Latin translation of a text attributed to pope Innocent III, describing the history of man's life from birth to death.
- Le Grant Blason des faulces amours, (of which an edition dating to 1529 published in Lyon at the house of Claude Nourry). This poem, 126 stanzas in twelve verses, is a dialogue between a gentleman and a monk (supposed to be the author), the former defending love, the latter opposing it. The monk's arguments mainly consist of attacking women, in the tradition of the misogynist works denounced by Christine de Pizan in the introduction to The Book of the City of Ladies. His arguments are so convincing that the gentleman ends up agreeing with the monk. The work was popular enough to be cited in another famous misogynist work of the time, Les Quinze Joies de mariage and to incite another author to edit a Contre blason, where the same arguments are this time defended by two women, a woman of the court and a nun. The latter has the last word.
- Le Dialogue du Crucifix et du Pèlerin, according to the title written during a 1486 pilgrimage to Jerusalem and printed in Paris.
- Le Loyer des folles amours, et le Triomphe des Muses contre l'amour, following the "Quinze joies du mariage"
- Le Passe-temps du prieur de Bussy et de son frère le cordelier
- Le Miroir des Moines
- Le Martyrologe des fausses langues et le chapitre général d'icelles tenu au temple de Danger
- Quatre chants royaux qui se trouvent parmi les Palinodies
- Le Débat de l'homme et de la femme, written around 1461, went through at least seven separate editions between 1490 and 1530

Jean de La Fontaine admired his poetry.

== Sources ==
- Bibliothèque françoise, ou Histoire de la littérature françoise, Claude-Pierre Goujet, 1754, 1755, at the house of P. J. Mariette and H.-L. Guerin

== Bibliography ==
Michel-André Bossy, Woman's Plain Talk in Le Débat de l'omme et de la femme by Guillaume Alexis. (Le franc-parler féminin dans "Le Débat de l'homme et de la femme" de Guillaume Alexis), Fifteenth-Century Studies 16 (1990): 23–41.
