= Franciscan Crown =

Type of Catholic rosary

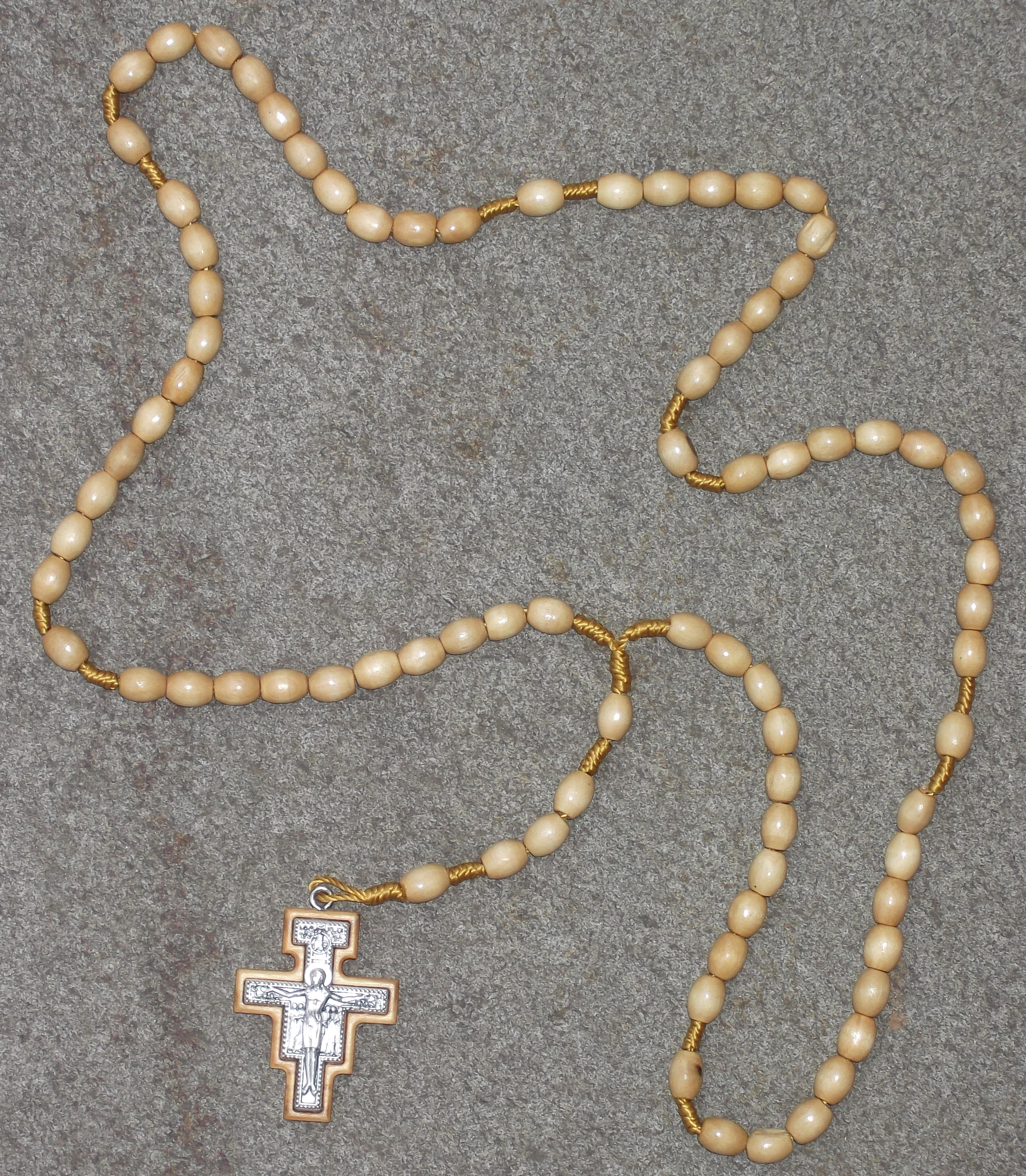
Franciscan Crown Rosary

The Franciscan Crown (or Seraphic Rosary) is a rosary consisting of seven decades in commemoration of the Seven Joys of the Virgin, namely, the Annunciation, the Visitation, the Nativity of Jesus, the Adoration of the Magi, the Finding in the Temple, the Resurrection of Jesus, and finally, either or both the Assumption of Mary and the Coronation of the Virgin. Devotion to the seven joys of Mary is found in a variety of forms and communities. It is especially popular with the Franciscans, Cistercians, and the Annunciades of St. Joan of France. The devotion was granted many indulgences by different popes, becoming the most heavily indulgenced devotion in the Catholic Church. In order for any associated indulgences to be received it was not necessary for a Franciscan rosary to have been blessed or even to use beads at all.

== History ==
The Franciscan Crown has variously been called the Franciscan Rosary, the Seraphic Rosary or the Rosary of the Seven Joys of Our Lady. The "Seven Joys" is a devotion that recalls seven joyful episodes in the life of the Blessed Virgin Mary. The practice originated among the Franciscans in early 15th-century Italy. The themes resemble the 12th-century Gaudes, Latin praises that ask Mary to rejoice because God has favored her in various ways.

The Franciscan historian, Luke Wadding (1588-1657) dates the origin of the Franciscan Crown to the year 1422. According to Franciscan tradition, in 1422 an apparition of the Blessed Virgin Mary took place in Assisi, to a Franciscan novice named James. As a child, he had the custom of offering daily the Virgin Mary a crown of roses. When he entered the Friars Minor, he became distressed that he would no longer be able to offer this gift. The Blessed Virgin appeared to him to give him comfort and showed him another daily offering that he might do: to pray every day seven decades of Hail Marys, meditating between each decade on one of the seven joys that she had experienced in her life.

Among the Friars Minor, the promotion of this devotion is attributed to Bonaventure, Cherubin of Spoleto, John Capistran, Pelbart of Temesvár, and Bernardino of Siena to mention a few. Bernadine is also said to have had a vision of the Virgin Mary when he was meditating on the seven joys of Mary.

According to Charles Sammons, "The Franciscan Crown offers us a chance to meditate on certain mysteries that we do not find in the Dominican Rosary [traditional Rosary], such as the Adoration of the Magi."

== Order of prayers ==
Following a brief period of meditation on each mystery, one Lord's Prayer and ten Hail Marys are prayed in order.

It is customary, after the seventh mystery, to pray two more Hail Marys to bring the total number to seventy-two in honor of the tradition that Mary lived for seventy-two years.
