= Little John of Saintré =

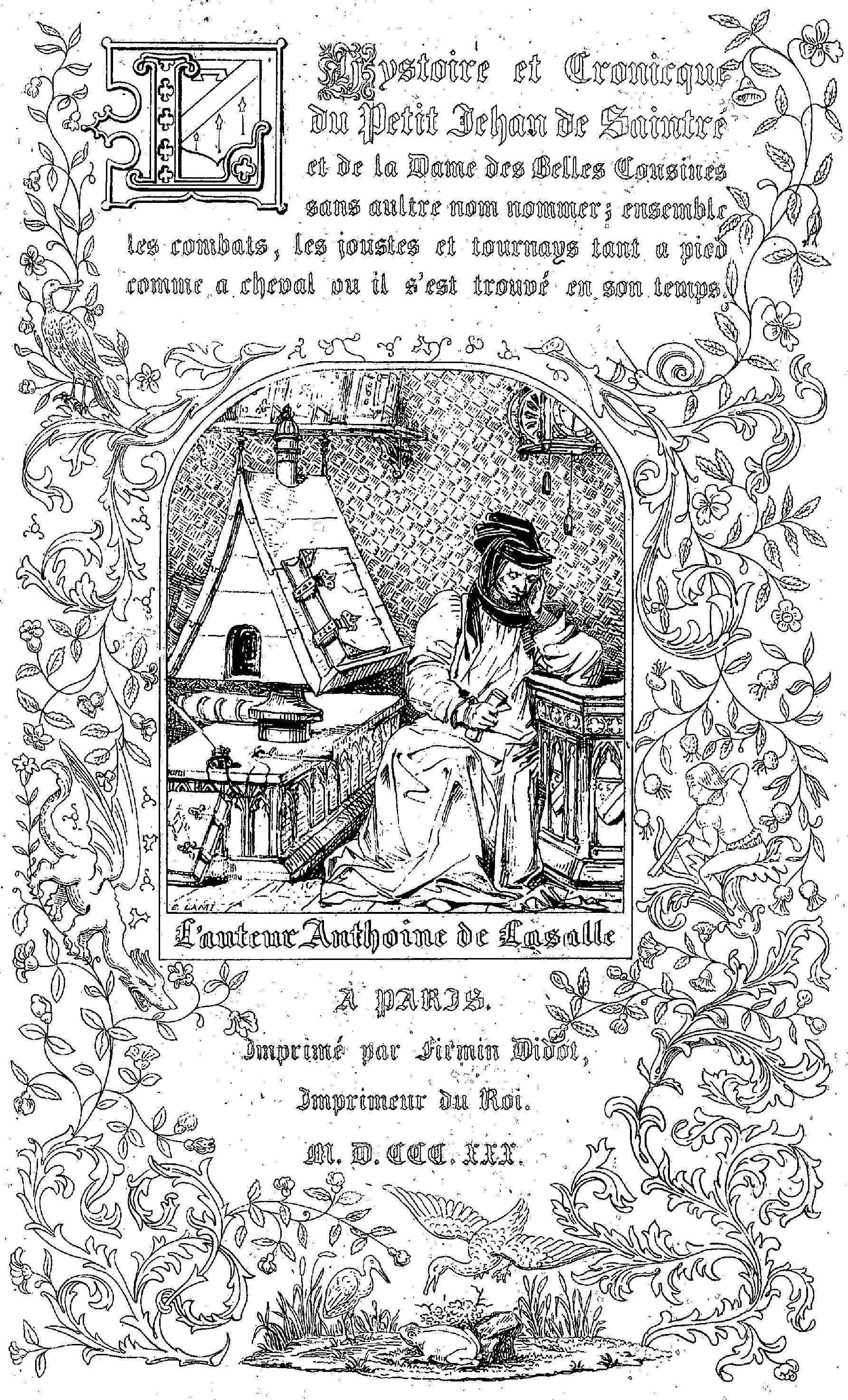
Frontispiece of 1830 edition of Le Petit Jehan de Saintré, showing the author, as imagined at the time

Little John of Saintré (French: Le Petit Jehan de Saintré), full title L'Hystoire et plaisante cronicque du petit Jehan de Saintré et de la jeune dame des Belles-Cousines sans aultre nom nommer, is a 1456 novel or romance written by Antoine de la Salle. It was the author's most successful work, written when he was nearly 70 years of age. He dedicated to it his former pupil, Jean de Calibre. An envoi in manuscript 10,057 (nouv. acq. fr.) in the Bibliothèque Nationale, Paris, states that it was completed at Grand Châtelet on 6 March 1455 (i.e. 1456).

La Sale also announces an intention, never fulfilled, apparently, of writing a romance of Paris et Vienne. The manuscript of Petit Jehan de Saintré usually contains in addition Floridam et Elvide, translated by Rasse de Brunhamel from the Latin of Nicolas de Clamange. Brunhamel says that La Sale had delighted to write honorable histories from the time of his "florie jeunesse", which confirms a reasonable inference from the style of Petit Jehan le Saintré that its author was no novice in the art of romance-writing.

== The text ==
Petit Jehan de Saintré gives, at the point when the traditions of chivalry were fast disappearing, an account of the education of an "ideal knight" and rules for his conduct under many different circumstances. When Petit Jehan, aged thirteen, is persuaded by the Dame des Belles-Cousines to accept her as his lady, she gives him systematic instruction in religion, courtesy, chivalry and the arts of success. She materially advances his career until Saintré becomes an accomplished knight, the fame of whose prowess spreads throughout Europe. This section of the romance, apparently didactic in intention, fits in with the author's other works of edification. But in the second part this virtuous lady falls victim to a vulgar intrigue with Dame Abbé. One of La Sale's commentators, Joseph Neve, ingeniously maintains that the last section is simply to show how the hero, after passing through the other grades of education, learns at last by experience to arm himself against coquetry. The book may, however, be fairly regarded as satirizing the whole theory of "courteous" love, by the simple method of fastening a repulsive conclusion on an ideal case. The contention that the fabliau-like ending of a romance begun in idyllic fashion was due to the corrupt influences of the Dauphin's exiled court is inadmissible, for the last page was written when the prince arrived in Brabant in 1456. That it is an anti-clerical satire seems unlikely. The profession of the seducer is not necessarily chosen from that point of view. Some light is thrown on the romance by the circumstances of the duc de Calibre, to whom it was dedicated. His wife, Marie de Bourbon, was one of the "Belles-Cousines" who contended for the favor of Jacquet or Jacques de Lalaing in the Livre des faits de Jacques Lalaing which forms the chief source of the early exploits of Petit Jehan.

The incongruities of La Sale's aims appear in his method of construction. The hero is not imaginary. Jehan de Saintré flourished in the Hundred Years' War, was taken prisoner after the 1356 Battle of Poitiers, with the elder Jean II Le Maingre, called Boucicaut, and was employed in negotiating the Treaty of Brétigny. Jean Froissart mentioned him as "le meilleur et le plus vaillant chevalier de France." His exploits as related in the romance are, however, founded on those of Jacques de Lalaing (c. 1422-1453), who was brought up at the Burgundian court, and became such a famous knight that he excited the rivalry of the "Belles-Cousines", Marie de Bourbon and Marie of Cleves, Duchess of Orléans. Lalaing's exploits are related by more than one chronicler, but M. Gustave Raynaud thinks that the Livre des faits de Jacques de Lalaing, published among the works of Georges Chastellain, to which textual parallels may be found in Petit Jehan, should also be attributed to La Sale, who in that case undertook two accounts of the same hero, one historical and the other fictitious. To complicate matters, he drew, for the later exploits of Petit Jehan, on the Livres des faits de Jean Boucicaut, which gives the history of the younger Boucicaut. The atmosphere of the book is not the rough realities of the English wars in which the real Saintré figured but that of the courts to which La Sale was accustomed.
