= Manuel Milà i Fontanals =

Spanish scholar

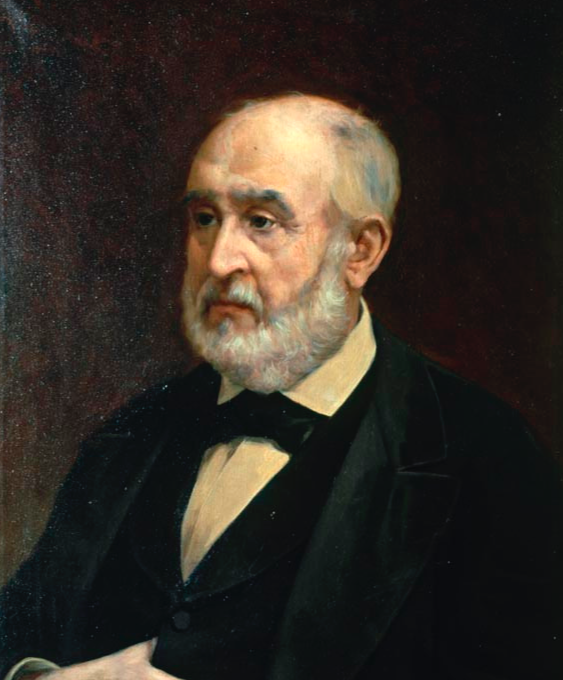
- Born: Manuel Milà i Fontanals; 4 May 1818; Vilafranca del Penedès, Spain
- Died: 16 July 1884 (aged 66); Vilafranca del Penedès, Spain
- Education: University of Cervera
- Occupations: Philologist, writer
- Employer: University of Barcelona

Manuel Milà i Fontanals (Catalan pronunciation: [mənuˈɛl miˈla]; May 4, 1818 – July 16, 1884) was a Spanish scholar. He was born at Vilafranca del Penedès, near Barcelona, and was educated first in Barcelona, and afterwards at the University of Cervera.

In 1845, he became professor of literature at the University of Barcelona, and held this post until his death at Vilafranca del Penedès on the July 16, 1884. The type of the scholarly recluse, Milà i Fontanals was almost unknown outside the walls of the university until 1859, when he was appointed president of the jocs florals at Barcelona.

On the publication of his treatise, De Los trovadores en España (1866), his merits became more generally recognized, and his monograph, De la poesía heróico-popular castellana (1873) revealed him to foreign scholars as a master of scientific method. He brought the chivalric romance Curial e Güelfa to scholarly notice in 1876.
