= Cent Nouvelles Nouvelles =

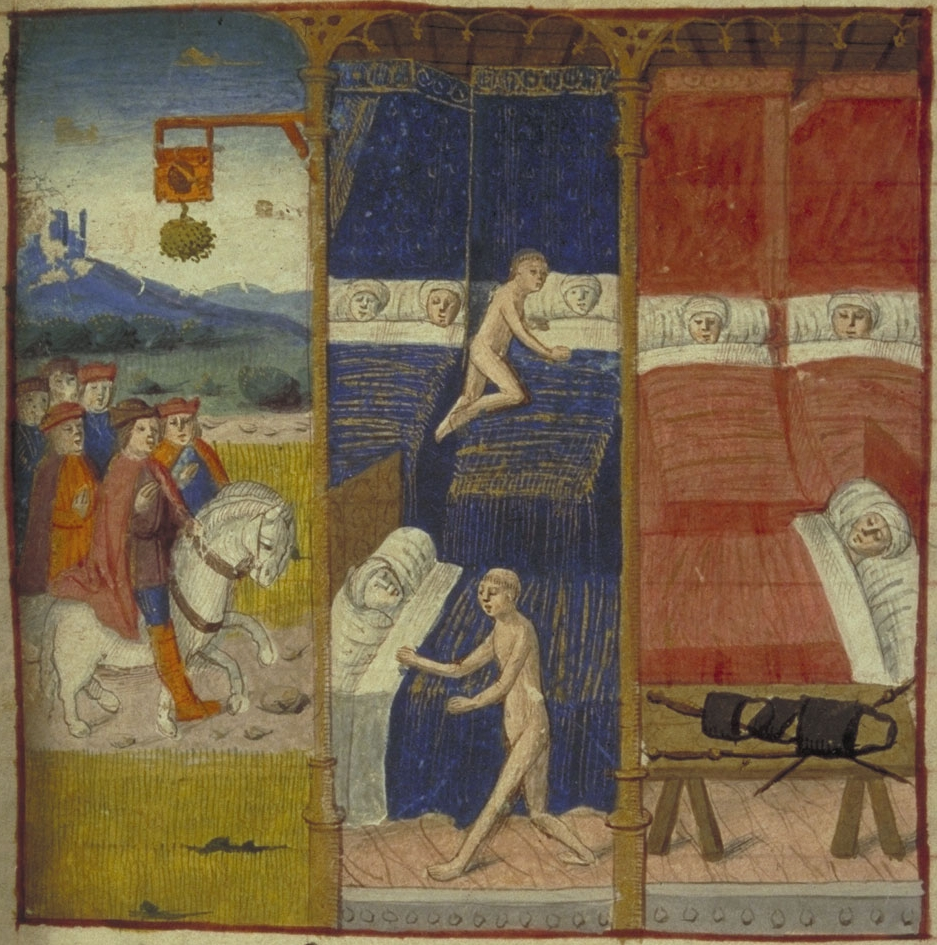
- The tale of the three friars, from the illustrated manuscript Hunter 252
- Author: Antoine de la Sale
- Translator: Robert B. Douglas
- Language: French
- Publication place: France
- English publication date: 1899
- Media type: Print
- Dewey Decimal: 843/.3
- LC Class: PQ1553.C33 D83 1996

The Cent Nouvelles Nouvelles ("One Hundred New Novellas") is a collection of stories supposed to be narrated by various persons at the court of Philip the Good, and collected together by Antoine de la Sale in the mid-15th century.

The nouvelles are, according to George Saintsbury, "undoubtedly the first work of literary prose in French ... The short prose tale of a comic character is the one French literary product the pre-eminence and perfection of which it is impossible to dispute, and the prose tale first appears to advantage in the Cent Nouvelles Nouvelles."

Antoine de la Sale is supposed to have been the "acteur" in the collection of the licentious stories. One only of the stories is given in his name, but he is credited with the compilation of the whole, for which Louis XI was long held responsible. A completed copy of this was presented to the Duke of Burgundy at Dijon in 1462.

The stories give curious glimpses of life in the 15th century, providing a genuine view of the social condition of the nobility and the middle classes. M. Lenient, a French critic, says: "Generally the incidents and personages belong to the bourgeoisée; there is nothing chivalric, nothing wonderful; no dreamy lovers, romantic dames, fairies, or enchanters. Noble dames, bourgeois, nuns, knights, merchants, monks, and peasants mutually dupe each other. The lord deceives the miller's wife by imposing on her simplicity, and the miller retaliates in much the same manner. The shepherd marries the knight's sister, and the nobleman is not over scandalized. The vices of the monks are depicted in half a score tales, and the seducers are punished with a severity not always in proportion to the offence."

== History of the book ==
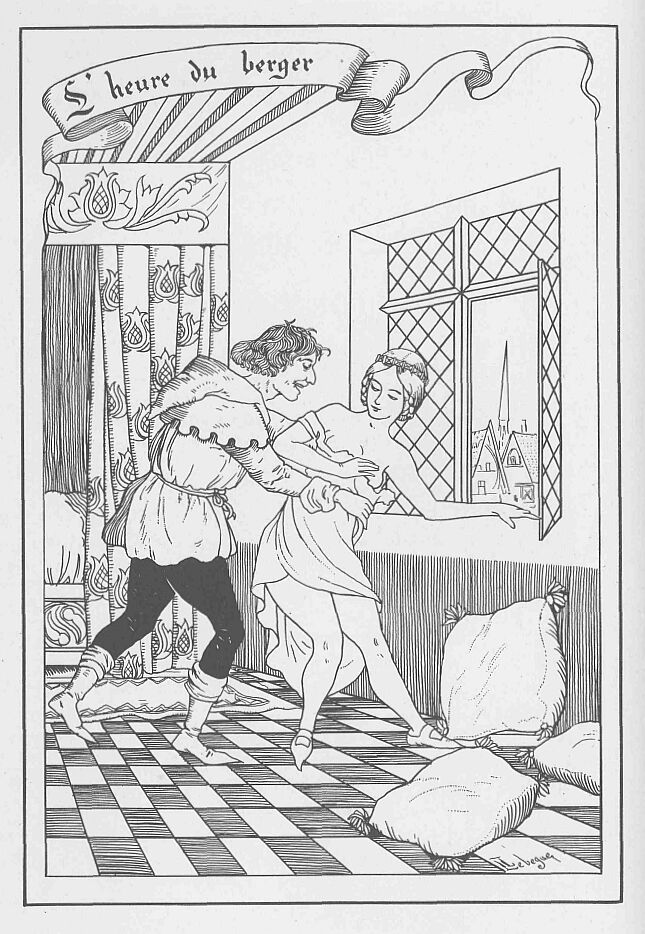
In this illustration from the 54th story, "The Right Moment", in the 1899 English edition, a damsel of Maubeuge shocks and surprises a knight of Flanders.

It was first translated into English in 1899 by Robert B. Douglas, though an edition was edited in French by an English scholar Thomas Wright in 1858. It can hardly have been the coarseness of some of the stories that prevented the Nouvelles from being presented to English readers when there were by that time half a dozen versions of the Heptaméron, which is as coarse as the Nouvelles.

In addition to this, there is the history of the book itself, and its connection with one of the most important personages in French history — Louis XI. Indeed, in many older French and English works of reference, the authorship of the Nouvelles has been attributed to him, and though in recent years, the writer is now believed — and no doubt correctly — to have been Antoine de la Salle, it is tolerably certain that Prince Louis heard all the stories related, and very possibly contributed several of them.

The circumstances under which these stories came to be narrated involve the period from 1456 to 1461, when Louis was estranged from his father, Charles VII of France, and was being kept by Philip III, Duke of Burgundy. It was during these five years that these stories were told to amuse his leisure. Probably there were many more than a hundred narrated — perhaps several hundreds — but the literary man who afterwards "edited" the stories only selected those he deemed best, or, perhaps, those he heard recounted. The narrators were the nobles who formed the Dauphin's Court. Much ink has been spilled over the question whether Louis himself had any share in the production. In nearly every case the author's name is given, and ten of them (Nos. 2, 4, 7, 9, 11, 29, 33, 69, 70 and 71) are described in the original edition as being by "Monseigneur." Publishers of subsequent editions brought out at the close of the 15th, or the beginning of the 16th, century, jumped to the conclusion that "Monseigneur" was really the Dauphin, who not only contributed largely to the book, but after he became King personally supervised the publication of the collected stories.

For four centuries Louis XI was credited with the authorship of the tales mentioned. The first person to throw any doubt on his claim was Thomas Wright, who edited an edition of the Cent Nouvelles Nouvelles published by Jannet, Paris, 1858. He maintained, with some show of reason, that as the stories were told in Burgundy, by Burgundians, and the collected tales were "edited" by de la Salle, it was more probable that "Monseigneur" would mean the Duke than the Dauphin, and he therefore ascribed the stories to Philippe le Bel. Later French scholars, however, appear to be of the opinion that "Monseigneur" was the Comte de Charolais, who afterwards became famous as Charles le Téméraire, the last Duke of Burgundy.

Some thirty-two noblemen or squires contributed the other stories, with some 14 or 15 taken from Giovanni Boccaccio, and as many more from Gian Francesco Poggio Bracciolini or other Italian writers, or French fabliaux, but about 70 of them appear to be original.

== See also ==
- French Renaissance literature
