= Antoine de la Sale =

French courtier, educator, and writer

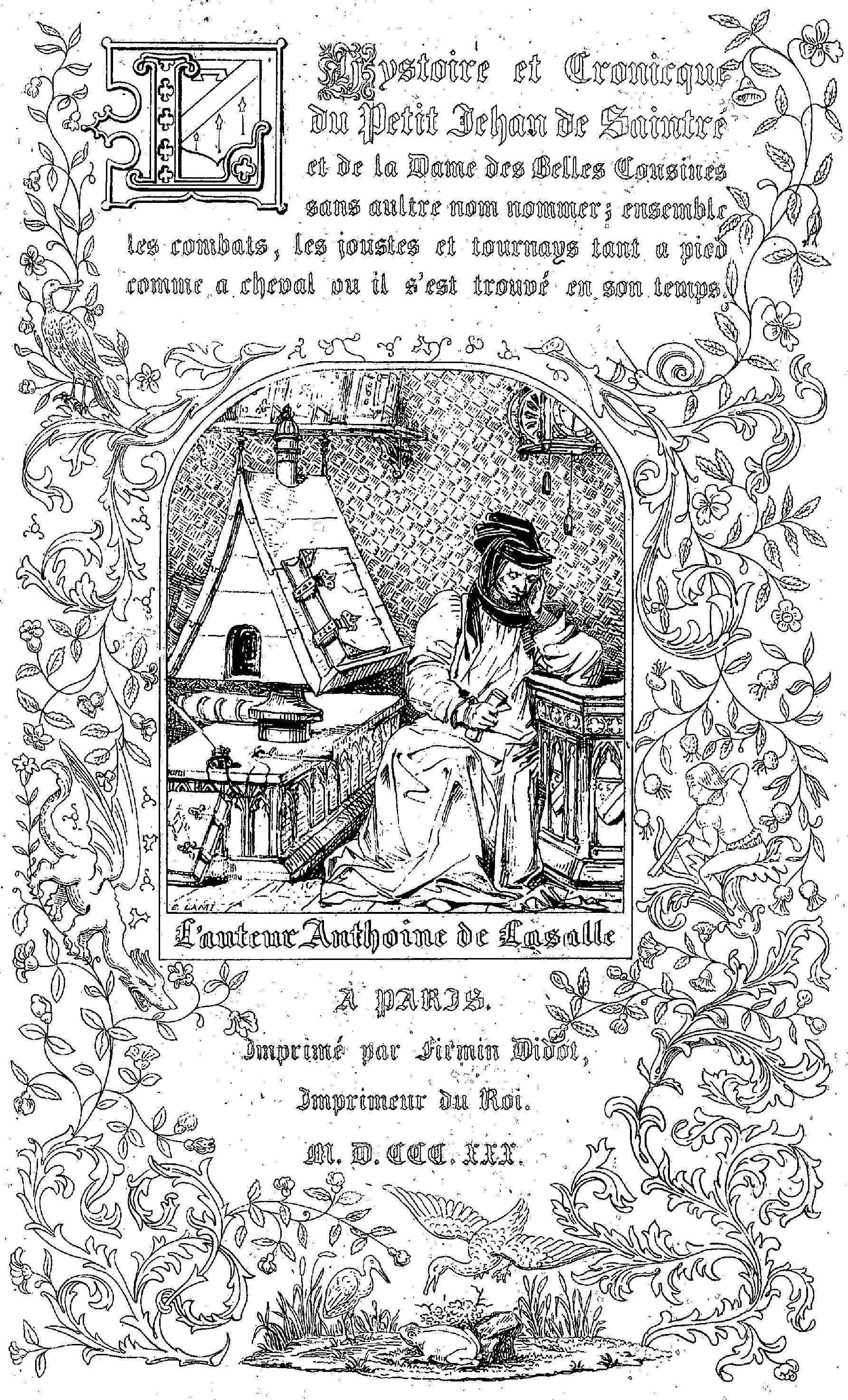
Frontispiece of an 1830 edition of Little John of Saintré, showing a fictitious author's portrait

Antoine de la Sale (also la Salle, de Lasalle; 1385/86 – 1460/61) was a French courtier, educator, and writer. He participated in a number of military campaigns in his youth and he only began writing when he had reached middle age, in the late 1430s. He lived in Italy at the time, but returned to France in the 1440s, where he acted as umpire in tournaments, and he wrote a treatise on the history of the knightly tournament in 1459. He became the tutor of the sons of Louis de Luxembourg, Count of Saint-Pol, to whom he dedicated a moral work in 1451. His most successful work was Little John of Saintré, written in 1456, when he was reaching the age of seventy.

== Biography ==
He was born in Provence, probably at Arles, the illegitimate son of Bernard de la Salle, a celebrated Gascon mercenary, mentioned in Froissart's Chronicles. His mother was a peasant, Perrinette Damendel.

In 1402 La Sale entered the court of the third Angevin dynasty at Anjou, probably as a page. In 1407 he was at Messina with Louis II, Duke of Anjou, who had gone there to enforce his claim to the kingdom of Sicily. The next years he perhaps spent in Brabant, for he was present at two tournaments given at Brussels and Ghent. In 1415 La Sale took part in the successful expedition by John I of Portugal against the Moors in Ceuta - a feat he would later recount in his book Reconfort a Madame de Neufville, published around 1458. In 1420 he accompanied the 17-year-old Louis III of Anjou in his attempt to assert his claim as King of Naples.

La Sale travelled from Norcia to the Monti Sibillini and the neighboring Lago di Pilato ("Pilate's Lake") (the final resting place of Pontius Pilate, according to local legend). The story of his adventures on this trip and of the local legends and Sibyl's Cave near Montemonaco form a chapter of La Salade, which also has a map of the ascent from Montemonaco.

In 1426 La Sale probably returned with Louis III of Anjou, who was also comte de Provence, to Provence, where he was acting as viguier of Arles in 1429. In 1434 René of Anjou, Louis's successor, made La Sale tutor to his son, John II, Duke of Lorraine (also known as the Duke of Calabria), to whom he dedicated, between the years 1438 and 1447, his La Salade, a textbook of the studies necessary for a prince. The title is of course a play on his own name, but he explains it as being due to the diverse subject matter of the book: a salad is composed "of many good herbs." The work covered geography, history, protocol and military tactics. One complete original copy has survived, and two early printed editions. It includes Queen Sibyl's Paradise (French: Le Paradis de la reine Sibylle), and Trip to the Lipari Isles (French: Excursion aux Îles Lipari), but these have often been edited separately.

In 1439 La Sale was again in Italy in charge of the castle of Capua, with John II and his young wife, Marie de Bourbon, when the place was besieged by the king of Aragon. La Sale married Lione de la Sellana de Brusa in the same year. He was about fifty-three; she was fifteen. René abandoned Naples in 1442, and Antoine no doubt returned to France about the same time. His advice was sought at the tournaments which celebrated the marriage of the unfortunate Margaret of Anjou at Nancy in 1445; and in 1446, at a similar display at Saumur, he was one of the umpires.

La Sale's pupil was now twenty years of age, and after forty years' service to the house of Anjou, La Sale left it to become tutor to the sons of Louis de Luxembourg, Count of Saint-Pol, who took him to Flanders and presented him at the court of Philip the Good, duke of Burgundy. For his new pupils he wrote at Chatelet-sur-Oise, in 1451, a moral work entitled La Salle. He followed his patron to Genappe in Brabant when the Dauphin (afterwards Louis XI) took refuge at the Burgundian court.

During the last decade of his life, La Sale becomes productive as a writer, publishing his most famous work, Little John of Saintré in 1456, a consolatory epistle Reconfort a Madame de Neufville in 1458 and his tournament book Des anciens tournois et faictz d'armes in 1459. Cent Nouvelles Nouvelles, a collection of licentious stories supposed to be narrated by various persons at the court of Philip the Good, was apparently collected or edited by him. A completed copy of this was presented to the Duke of Burgundy at Dijon in 1462. If then La Sale was the author, he probably was still living; otherwise the last mention of him is in 1461.

== Works ==
- The Salad (French: La Salade) (1440–1444)
- La Salle (1451)
- Little John of Saintré (French: Le Petit Jehan de Saintré) (1456), de La Salle's most famous work.
- Reconfort a Madame de Neufville (c. 1458) A consolatory epistle including two stories of parental fortitude, written at Vendeuil-sur-Oise.
- Des anciens tournois et faictz d'armes (1459)
- Journee l'Onneur et de Prouesse (1459)
- Cent Nouvelles nouvelles (1461/2?), a collection of short stories, "undoubtedly the first work of literary prose in French", collected (and possibly partly authored or edited) by La Sale.
- La Sale is considered a possible author of Les Quinze joies de mariage.
- Some critics have ascribed to him also the farce of Maitre Pathelin, but this is disputed.
