= Les Quinze joies de mariage =

Les Quinze joies de mariage (The 15 Joys of Marriage) is an anonymous late 14th or early 15th century French satire in prose which presents a picture, full of sharpness and humour, of the rows and deceits which afflict the married state. The misogynist satire is allied to a pitiless analysis of the blindness of husbands in everyday, concrete situations.

The earliest surviving manuscript dates to 1464, but is not the original manuscript. Bernard de la Monnoye proposed 1450 as the date of writing, and this has been the generally accepted date of writing. A riddle can be found at the end of the book; André Pottier proposed in 1830 that the riddle proves the work is by Antoine de la Sale; this is the most widely, although not universally, accepted candidate of author.
