= Battle of Portopí =

1229 battle during the Almohad conquest of Majorca

Coordinates: 39°33′15″N 2°37′09″E

- Part of Conquest of Majorca
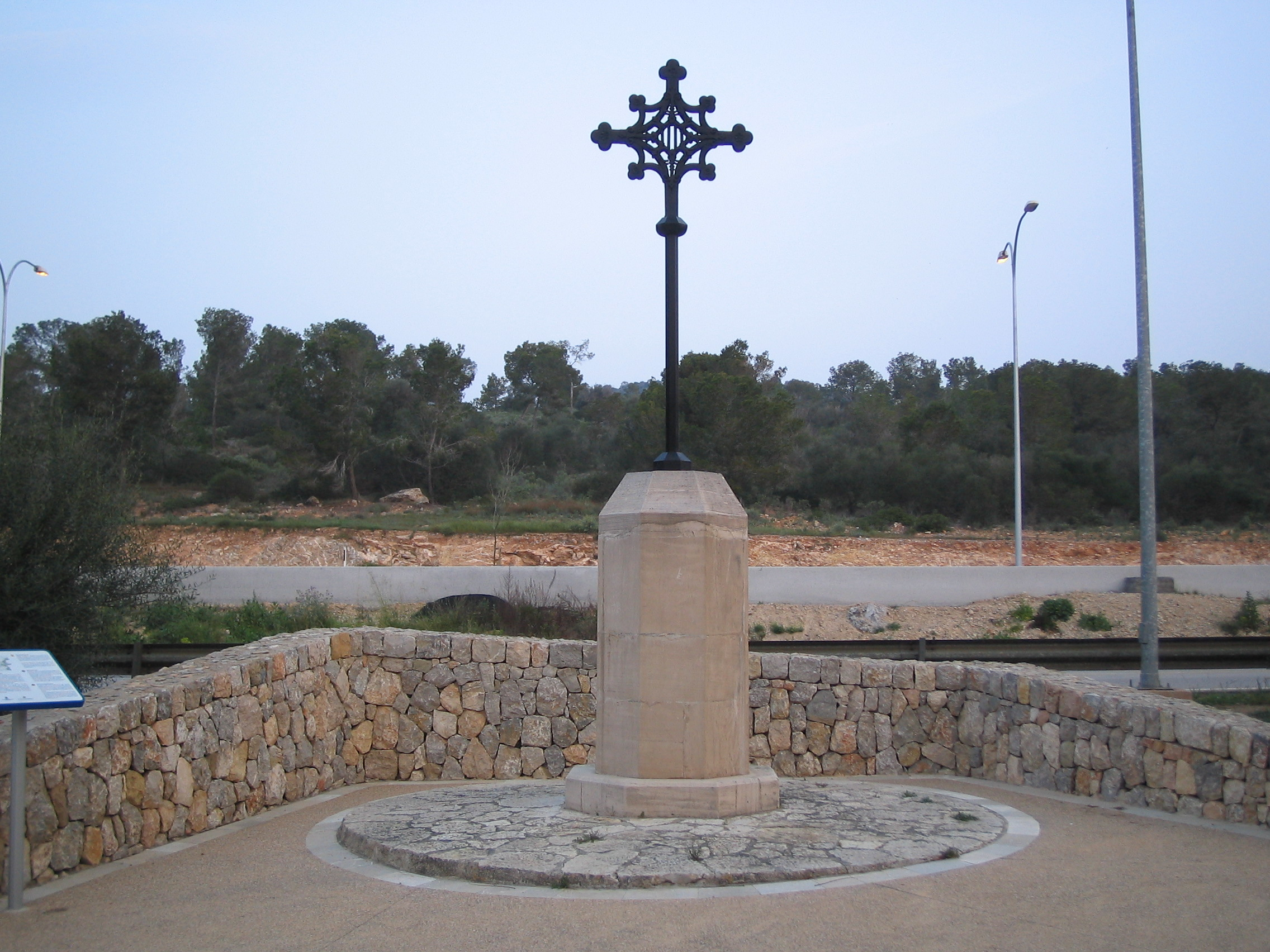
- Creu de Montcada (Tomás Vila, 1886); Monument to the two fallen nobles in the battle.
| Date | 12 September 1229 |
| Location | Sierra de Na Burguesa (Majorca) |
| Result | Aragonese victory |

Belligerents
| Crown of Aragon | Almohad Caliphate |

Commanders and leaders
| James I of Aragon | Abu Yahya |

The Battle of Portopí (12 September 1229) was an open field military conflict between the Almohad troops that occupied the island of Majorca and the Christian army led by King James I the Conqueror with the aim of annexing it to the Crown of Aragon in order to expand their domain and return it back to Christiandom. It was carried out at various points in the current Sierra de Na Burguesa (formerly called Sierra de Portopí), approximately halfway between the current resort town of Santa Ponsa and the City of Majorca (present Palma de Mallorca). It was the second major battle in the campaign for the conquest of the island of Majorca initiated by the Aragonese king.

== Background ==
After previous failed attempts to take control of the island, the army of James I managed to anchor in the Santa Ponsa bay on 10 September and deploy forces to begin the invasion. That same day they had a first major clash with the Muslims, from which they emerged winners, and after which they encamped at the site for the night.

After being informed in the evening that the Almohad governor of the island, Abu Yahya, had regrouped his troops, and they were making their way from the capital to meet the Christians, the Aragonese monarch gave the relevant warning instructions to his men in order to avoid a possible surprise enemy attack.

== The battle ==
Historians such as Zurita state that on the morning of Wednesday, 12 September, Guillermo de Montcada and his nephew Ramón on the one hand, and on the other Nuño Sánchez, argued over who would ride at the head of the army in the battle that they assumed was going to take place the next day. Zurita adds that ultimately, on that same day and without waiting for Sánchez, the Montcadas led their men towards the enemy position, thus forcing the rest of the army to second them in action. According to Desclot, it was the king himself who ordered the start of the attack, sending the Montcadas to go in the forefront of the troops. What is certain is that uncle and nephew were locked in fight with the hosts of the Muslim king of Majorca in the Sierra de Na Burguesa (then known as Sierra de Portopí), thus beginning the battle.

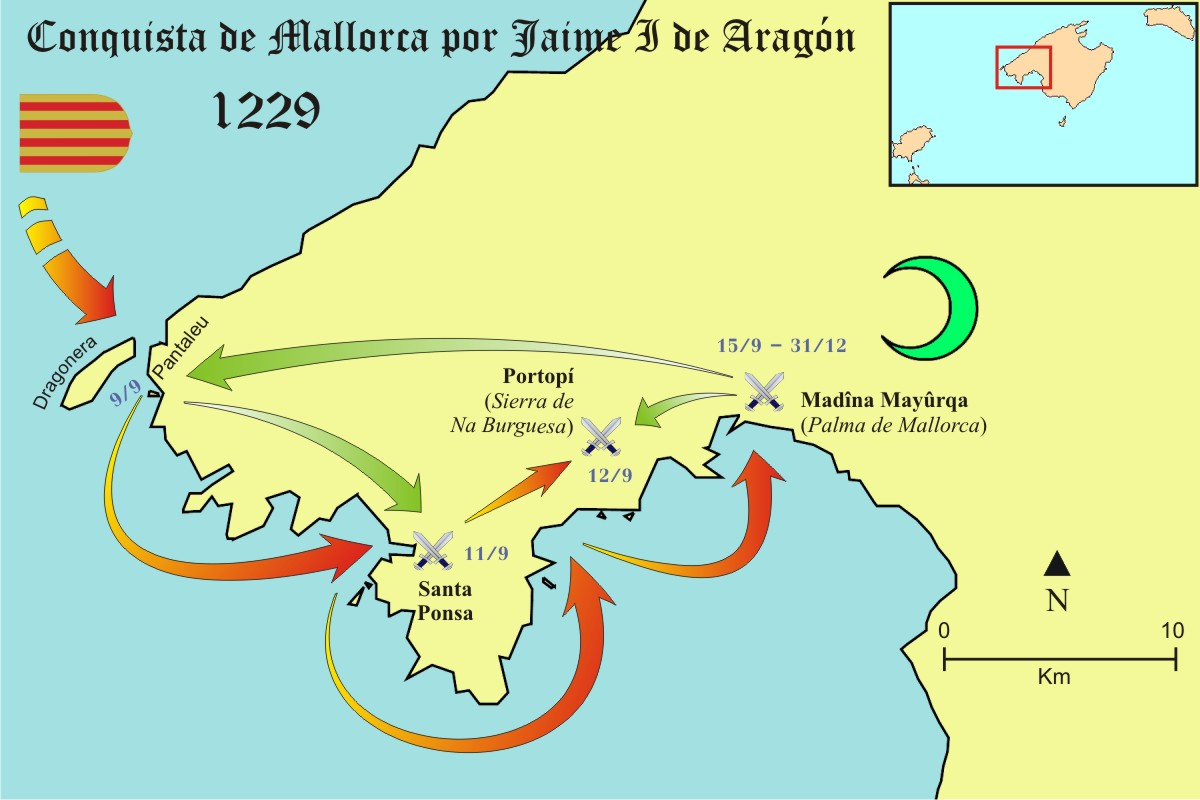
Diagram of the first movements and battles of the conquest of Majorca.

The Montcadas' first attack against the Muslims started in the foothills of the mountains. The Christians initially appeared to have the upper hand but they were then surrounded by forces superior in number to theirs. The two nobles perished, along with others, in the ensuing struggle. Tradition has it that they were taken prisoner and beheaded by the Muslims. Later it was the Bishop of Barcelona, Berenguer de Palou, who communicated the death of the two men to the king.

James I, who was as yet unaware of the death of these men, followed the same path, advancing with the rest of the army, intending to join them and participate together in the battle. He encountered the enemy in the highlands.

In the height of the battle, when confronted by a strong contingent of Muslim cavalry that forced the Nuño Sánchez host to retreat, the Conqueror famously exclaimed: Vergonya, cavallers, vergonya! ("For shame, Knights, shame!"), because of the fear shown by some Catalan troops.

At the end of the day and after successive battles in various parts of the mountain, the king and his army defeated the Muslims (who withdrew to Majorca), eventually gaining a strategic position in the mountains, from which the capital could be seen. They rested and spent the night in Bendinat (toponym that, according to local tradition, come from the Catalan Bé hem dinat, "We have eaten well").

== Consequences ==
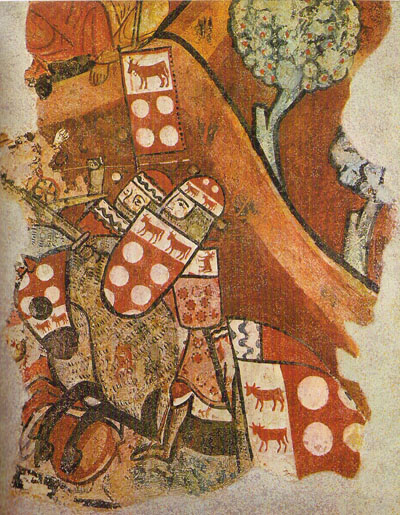
Detail of Guillem II de Montcada i de Bearn

On Thursday 13th the camp was fortified with trenches, the navy that was in La Porrassa advanced to Portopí where they seized several Saracens vessels, and a portion of the fleet anchored off the city.

On Friday 14, Aragon men buried the Montcadas. The burial ceremony was held in the Bendinat mountains, beside a pine tree that was retained until 1914, popularly known as the Pine of the Montcadas.

The outcome of the Battle of Portopí marked the subsequent fate of the conquest of the island. Thereafter there were no major clashes in the open. The siege of the city of Majorca, where the bulk of the Muslim army was stationed, was immediately formalized. The ultimate goal that would pave the way for the control of the island was within reach.

== Monuments ==
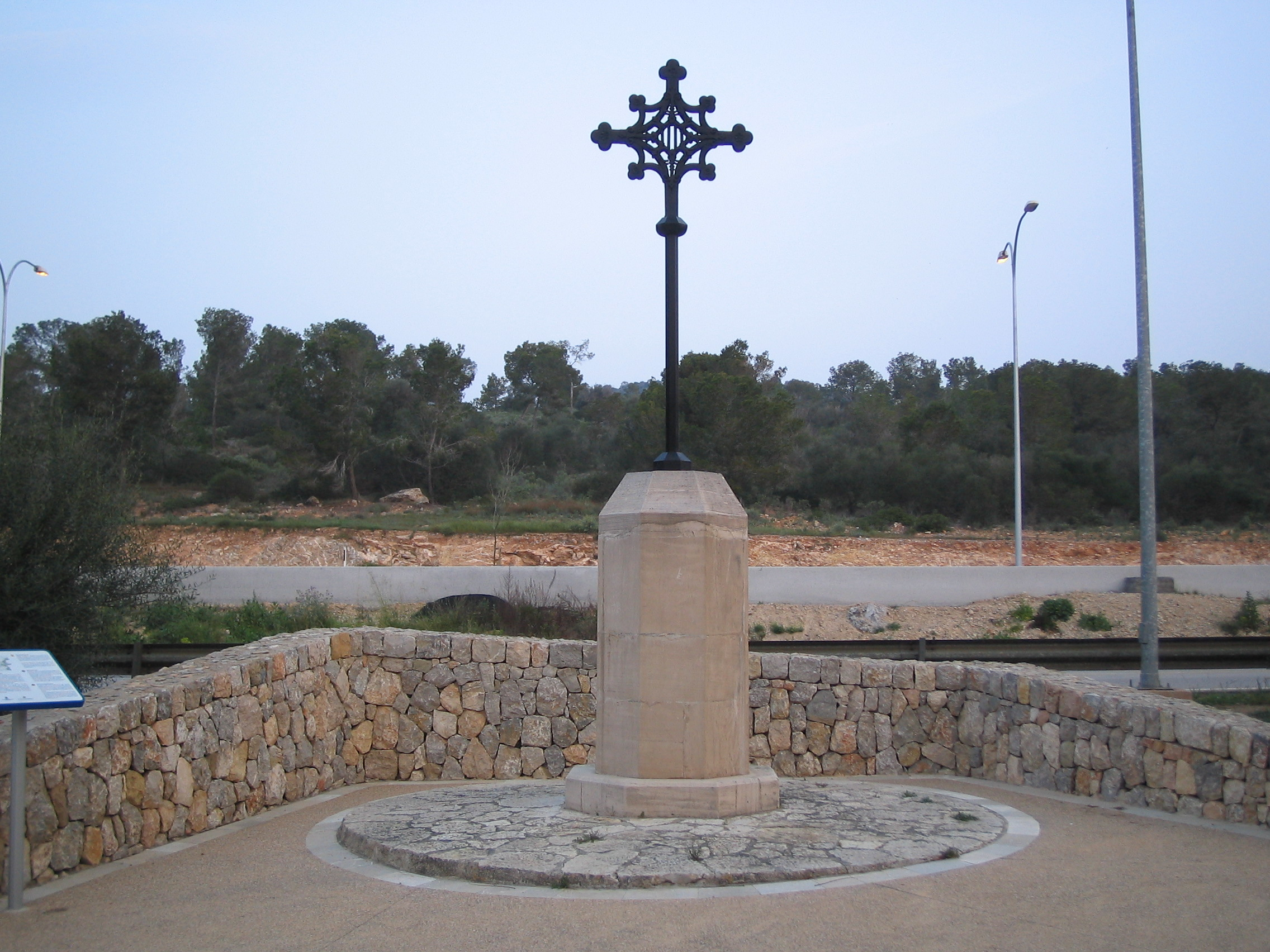
Monument at the location where Guillermo y Ramón Montcada were buried, forming, in 2008, part of the Paseo Calviá network.

Several landmarks in Majorca commemorate the first phase of the conquest of the island. Under the initiative of a group of Catalans and writers from the south of France, the Creu de Montcada ("Montcada Cross") was erected in 1887. This monument stands at the location where, according to tradition, the two nobles died: along the kilometre 14 of the old road from Palma to Andrach, present day Paseo Calviá. The work, designed by Tomás Vila (1893–1963), was erected next to the aforementioned pine, and consists of a stone pedestal from Santanyí and a large Gothic cross. The traditional Barras de Aragón, the heraldic symbol par excellence of the Crown, is depicted in the centre of this cross. One side of the base bears the coat of arms of the Montcadas and the other the commemorative dates. The opening ceremony for the monument and the tribute to the nobles was organized and conducted by the Colell literary canon in which Jacinto Verdaguer also participated.

In 1929, in commemoration of the seven hundredth anniversary of the battle, a Neoromanesque style building called the Ermita de la piedra sagrada (Shrine of the Sacred Stone), was erected between the Puig de sa Ginesta and the Puig d'en Zaragoza. This shrine owes its name to the fact that its inside hosts the stone that served as an altar for the first mass the conquerors held before their first battle.

The Creu del Desembarcament ("Cross of the Landing") was also opened in Santa Ponsa that year. It is a work by Vila, just like the previous. The reliefs on the base allude to the eight phases of the conquest of the island, among which is the battle of Portopí.
