= Siege of Artà =

Capture of Artà by Aragonese forces in 1230

Coordinates: 39°41′47″N 3°20′57″E

- Part of Conquest of Majorca
| Date | March 1230 |
| Location | Artà, Mallorca |
| Result | Aragonese victory |

Belligerents
| Crown of Aragon; Knights Templar | Almohad Caliphate |

Commanders and leaders
| James I of Aragon; Nuño Sánchez; Hugh of Forcalquier | Unknown |

Strength
| Unknown | Unknown |

Casualties and losses
| Unknown | Unknown |

The siege of Artà was one of the battles of the Conquest of Majorca, which took place in 1230.

== Background ==
After the siege of Madîna Mayûrqa and the murder of the last Muslim wali of Majorca (Abu Yahya Muhammad), Abu Hafs ibn Sayrî fled to the mountains where he gathered 16,000 survivors of the massacre that followed the fall of Palma The Majorcan insurgency was fortified in the castles of Alaró, Pollença, and Santueri as well as in the Serra de Tramuntana, where the Majorcans then appointed Xuiap de Xivert as the new chief and lord. Most of the knights and men returned to Catalonia, and James I of Aragon had to reject single cavalcades with a reduced host on the western side of the Serra de Tramuntana and the Inca mountains because it was too dangerous.

== Siege ==
Informed James the Conqueror of a cave with 60 armed Saracens, on March 19, 1230, Nuño Sánchez and Hugh of Forcalquier left with the king of the city towards Artà establishing a camp at the foot of the coast, in the edge of a river. The attack initially consisted of fighting the door of the caves, from where the entrenched could attack the besiegers with stones. After setting fire to the barricades, surrender was offered, which took place on March 21.

== Consequences ==
The king returned to Catalonia in November 1230. In 1231, during the second expedition to Mallorca and after the death of Abu Hafs ibn Sayrî and his six thousand men in February Xuiap de Xivert surrendered in the Serra de Tramuntana, but about 2,000 Mallorcan Saracens refused to withdraw under these conditions and took refuge in the castle of Pollença, which was besieged and where the Majorcan chief Abu-Ali Umar died.
