= Ali of La Palomera =

ʿAlī (fl. 1229) was, according to the Llibre dels fets, "a Saracen ... from La Palomera" who defected during the conquest of Majorca and swam out to the fleet of King James I of Aragon with intelligence about the island. The Llibre is an eyewitness account written by James himself. The story, however, is much more developed in the later account of Bernat Desclot. According to Desclot, ʿAlī was the majordomo of the "king of Majorca" (the governor Abū Yaḥyā). He chose to defect when his mother, an astronomer, warned him that James would conquer the island. In reality, his choice was probably based on opposition to Abū Yaḥyā. He and his family would certainly have preserved their property by siding with the conquerors.

The story of ʿAlī and his mother entered the popular tradition in and around Andratx. The family is said to have owned Sant Elm, where his mother observed the stars from the walls. The story was taken up by poets during the Renaixença. The local poet Pere d'Alcàntara Penya i Nicolau (1823–1906) collected the stories and published a poem on them under the title N'Alí de la Palomera in 1871. He gave the name Zulema to ʿAlī's mother for the first time. Another poet, Tomàs Forteza i Cortès (1838–1898), wrote a similar poem on the woman's astrological feats.
