= Berenguer de Palou II =

Bishop of Barcelona (died 1241)

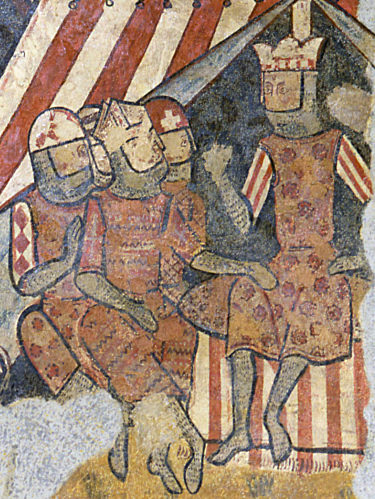
Bishop of Barcelona Berenguer de Palou II (seated) with James I of Aragon

Berenguer de Palou II (died 1241) was bishop of Barcelona from 1212 to 1241. He was a major supporter of James I of Aragon.

He began his career as a canon priest in Barcelona Cathedral during the episcopate of his uncle Berenguer de Palou I. Shortly after being elected bishop in 1212, he marched with Peter II of Aragon on the latter’s crusade against the Almohads in the Battle of Las Navas de Tolosa. Later Palou served as royal councilor and chancellor of the Crown of Catalonia-Aragon.

In 1219, he participated in the Fifth Crusade against Damietta in Egypt, contributing to the effort 50 knights and peons and unsuccessfully attempted to prevent the Cathar Crusade.

He founded various establishments for the destitute, offering the Castle of Aviñón del Penedés and some of his own properties for this effort. He supported the founding of the Mercedarian Order in 1218. Bishop Berenguer de Palou gave Peter Nolasco and his companions the white habit that they would wear as characteristic of the Order; he gave them the Rule of Saint Augustine as a norm for their life in common and he gave his authorization for the sign of his cathedral, the Holy Cross, to be on the habit of the Order. After that, Peter Nolasco and the first Mercedarians made their religious profession before the bishop.

In 1219, Bishop Berenguer also supported the introduction into Barcelona of the Dominican and Franciscan Orders.

In 1225, he accompanied James I on the unsuccessful attack on Peñíscola, Valencia.

Together they planned the invasion of Majorca, to which he contributed 99 knights and 1,000 foot soldiers. As a reward, he received 875 knighthood lands and 8 windmills, which had originally been the possession of the barony of Andratx. During the military operations against the Muslims of Mallorca, he was wounded, his foot being mutilated during the last campaign against the Muslims of this island.

In 1233, he was elected Archbishop of Tarragona, but Pope Gregory IX did not approve the election, and Palou did not occupy this see.

In 1237, he helped found the Monastery of Santa Clara in Barcelona.

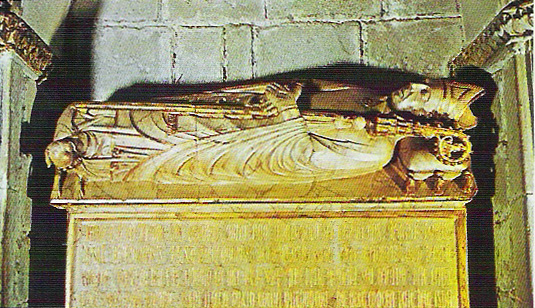
Sepulcher of Berenguer de Palou II, Cathedral of Barcelona

In 1238, he participated in the conquest of the taifas of Valencia and Dénia. He received various estates as a result and the Seignory of Almonesir.

He died in 1241, and his sepulcher can be found in the cathedral of Barcelona.

== Bibliography ==
ALVIRA CABRER, Martín. “Destruir aquels qui reneguen lo nom de Jhesuchrist. El obispo de Barcelona Berenguer de Palou (1212-1241)”, in Hombres de religión y guerra. Cruzada y guerra santa en la Edad Media peninsular, ss. X-XV, ed. Carlos de Ayala and J. Santiago Palacios. Madrid: Sílex, 2018, p. 361-418.
