= Nuño Sánchez =

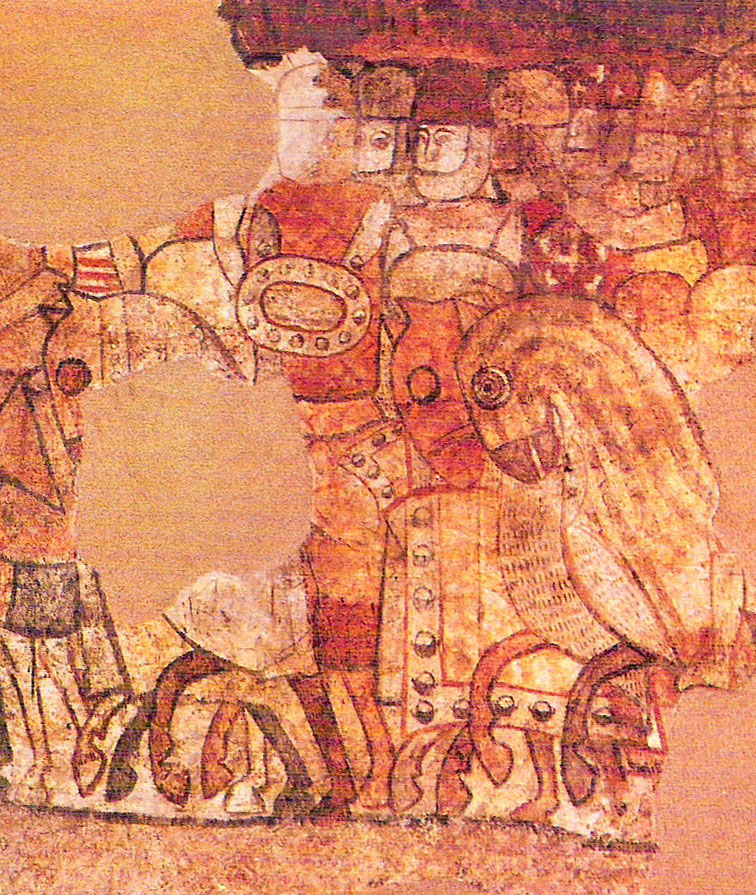
Fresco depicting Nuño Sánchez from the conquest of Majorca series in the Saló del Tinell of the Great Royal Palace in Barcelona

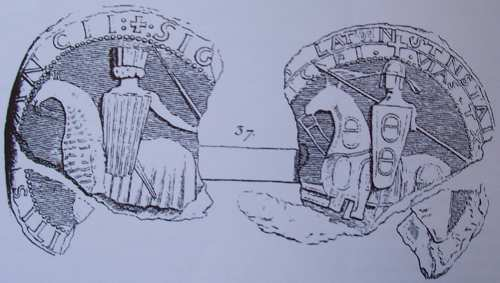
Seal of Nuño with the arms of Aragón and those of Lara displayed

Nuño Sánchez (Catalan: Nunó, Nunyó, or Nunyo Sanç, French: Nuno Sanche; c. 1185 – 1242) was a nobleman and statesman in the Crown of Aragon.

Nuño was the son of Sancho, Count of Provence, Roussillon, and Cerdagne, and Sancha Núñez of the House of Lara. His father was dispossessed of Provence in 1185 but maintained Roussillon and Cerdagne until his death in 1223, handing control of them over to his son as early as 1212. He was formally invested with them by Peter II of Aragon later that year. His full Latin title was Nunus Sancii, Dei gratia dominus de Rossillionis, Vallis de Asperii, Conflent et Cerritane ("Nuño Sánchez, by the grace of God lord of Roussillon, Vallespir, Conflent and Cerdagne").

His investment was of little help to Peter, for Nuño arrived too late to be of any service at the Battle of Muret (1213), where Peter died. Subsequently, he and his father served as regents for Peter's minor heir, James I. In 1215 his father married him to Peronella, daughter of Bernard IV of Bigorre, but the marriage was annulled by Pope Honorius III the very next year (1216). James reached his majority in 1223, the year Sancho died, and Nuño began serving James as chief advisor in matters relating to the Viscounty of Béarn.

By 1225, however, Nuño had grown weary of Aragonese politics and turned to his interests elsewhere. In 1226, he purchased the viscounties of Fenouillèdes and Peyrepertuse from Louis VIII of France and did homage for them.

Nuño was invited to participate in an expedition against Majorca in 1229 and this probably represents his return to favour in the Aragonese court, where the conquest of Majorca from the Almoravids had long been desired. Majorca finally capitulated in 1234 and Nuño was the recipient of much land. He only began to consistently use the title of "count" thereafter.

In 1230, he was tasked by James I of Aragon to lead an expedition against Tlemcen, the capital of the Kingdom of Tlemcen under the rule of the Zayyanid dynasty.

Late in life, Nuño accompanied James on his military expeditions into Navarre and Valencia (conquered 1238). In 1220, Nuño had married Teresa López, daughter of Lope Díaz II de Haro, Lord of Biscay. They had no children, so his lands and titles escheated to the crown on his death, either late 1241 or early 1242. The troubadour Aimeric de Belenoi composed a planh on his death, significant of his reputation for courtliness and chivalry. He was buried in the hospital of Bajoles, near Perpignan, now disappeared. He left an illegitimate son, the "Bastard of Roussillon," who defended the city of Elne from the French during Aragonese Crusade in 1284.

== Sources ==
- Bisson, Thomas N. The Medieval Crown of Aragon: A Short History. Oxford: Clarendon Press, 1986. ISBN 0-19-821987-3.

Preceded by Sancho	Count of Roussillon and Cerdagne; 1212–1242	Succeeded by James I
