= Abu Yahya Muhammad ibn Ali ibn Abi Imran al-Tinmalali =

Abu Yahya Muhammad ibn Ali ibn Abi Imran al-Tinmalali (Arabic: ابو يحي محمد بن علي بن أبي عمران التينمللي, romanized: Abū Yaḥyà Muḥammad ibn ʿAlī ibn Abī ʿImrān at-Tinmalālī), also known by the name of Muhammad ibn Ali ibn Mussa, and called in Christian sources Abu Iehie or Aboheihe, was the last Muslim Vali of Majorca.

The nisba al-Tinmalali reveals that he hailed from Tinmel, the Almohad capital in Morocco between 1121 and 1147.

In 1208 he was the last of the various governing Almohad Valis of Majorca who were appointed from Marrakech. In Majorca Abu-Yahya created a semi-independent princedom, with only a formal submission to the Almohad emir. He ruled the island and the entire Balearic archipelago in the name of the Almohad Empire until James I of Aragon conquered it in 1229 during the conquest of Majorca.

His son, only three years old at the time of his capture by James I, was baptized with the names of his father and his baptismal godfather. He became the first Baron of Gotor and the first Baron of Illueca in 1250, carrying the name Jaime de Gotor. He married Elvira Roldán, daughter of Martin Roldán and his wife María López de Luna and became the progenitor of the family with the surname Gotor.
