= List of Catalan-language writers =

This is an alphabetically sorted list of writers in the Catalan language:

== A ==
- Antònia Abelló
- Elisabet Abeyà
- Joan Alcover
- Gabriel Alomar
- Núria Añó
- Sebastià Juan Arbó

== B ==
- Borja Bagunyà
- Eva Baltasar
- Maria Gràcia Bassa i Rocas
- Prudenci Bertrana
- Joan Binimelis
- Ester Bonet
- Edmond Brazes
- Joan Brossa

== C ==
- Jaume Cabré
- Maria Teresa Cabré
- Pere Calders
- Mercè Canela
- Josep Carner
- Maite Carranza
- Jordi Casanovas
- Víctor Català
- Miquel Costa i Llobera
- Jaume Cuadrat
- Toni Cucarella

== D ==
- Bernat Desclot
- Teresa Duran

== E ==
- Francesc Eiximenis
- Salvador Espriu
- Vicent Andrés Estellés

== F ==
- Ester Fenoll Garcia
- Gabriel Ferrater
- Josep Vicenç Foix
- Francesc Fontanella
- Joan Fuster

== G ==
- Martí Joan de Galba
- Jordi Galceran
- Tomàs Garcés
- Gaziel
- Juan Goytisolo
- Adrià Gual
- Àngel Guimerà
- Francesc Vicent Garcia

== J ==
- Maria de la Pau Janer

== L ==
- Ramon Llull

== M ==
- Jordi de Manuel
- Joan Maragall
- Ausiàs March
- Joan Margarit
- Miquel Martí i Pol
- Joanot Martorell
- Bernat Metge
- Josep Maria Miró
- Gabriel Mòger
- Terenci Moix
- Jesús Moncada
- Quim Monzó
- Josep Ferrater i Mora
- Ramon Muntaner

== O ==
- Joan Oliver
- Maria Antònia Oliver Cabrer
- Narcís Oller
- Eugenio d'Ors

== P ==
- Miquel de Palol
- Sergi Pàmies
- Josep Pedrals i Urdàniz
- Manuel de Pedrolo
- Albert Sánchez Piñol
- Josep Pla
- Baltasar Porcel i Pujol
- Núria Pradas
- Gilabert de Próixita
- Frederic Pujulà i Vallés

== Q ==
- Pere Quart

== R ==
- Carles Riba
- Mercè Rodoreda
- Montserrat Roig
- Josep Romaguera
- Manel de la Rosa
- Bartomeu Rosselló-Pòrcel
- Santiago Rusiñol

== S ==
- Josep Maria de Sagarra
- Joan Sales
- Maria Antònia Salvà i Ripoll
- Joan Salvat-Papasseit
- Carmelina Sánchez-Cutillas i Martínez del Romero
- Cèlia Sànchez-Mústich
- Vicent Sanz i Arnau
- Isabel-Clara Simó
- Sílvia Soler
- Jaume Subirana

== T ==
- Ramon Bech Taberner
- Francesca Torrent
- Màrius Torres
- Anselm Turmeda

== V ==
- Josep Vallverdú
- Jacint Verdaguer
- Arnau de Vilanova

== X ==
- Ester Xargay Melero

== Z ==
- Lydia Zimmermann

== See also ==
- Catalan literature
- List of Catalan-language poets
