= La Decadència =

The early modern period (late 15th or 16th-18th centuries) in Catalan literature and historiography, while extremely productive for Castilian writers of the Siglo de Oro, has been termed La Decadència (Catalan pronunciation: [lə ðəkəˈðɛnsiə]; "The Decadence"), an era of decadence in Catalan literature and history, generally thought to be caused by a general falling into disuse of the vernacular language in cultural contexts and lack of patronage among the nobility, even in lands of the Crown of Aragon. This decadence is thought to accompany the general Castilianization of Spain and overall neglect of the Crown of Aragon's institutions after the dynastic union of the crowns of Castile and Aragon that resulted from the marriage of Ferdinand II of Aragon and Isabella I of Castile, a union finalized in 1474.

This is, however, a Romantic view made popular by writers and thinkers of the national awakening period known as Renaixença, in the 19th century. This presumed state of decadence is being contested with the appearance of recent cultural and literary studies showing there were indeed works of note in the period.

== Historical context ==
Historically, the decadent period refers to the decline of the thriving commercial Mediterranean empire that was the Crown of Aragon's exclusive provenance, which was absorbed into the Trastámara and later the Habsburg dynasties. What this signified was that the thriving bourgeoisie and commerce of the Crown of Aragon became subject to the increasingly inward-looking and absolutist policies that characterized Castile (Elliott 34).

The Catalan-Aragonese empire declined for several reasons: the outbreaks of the black plague in the fourteenth and fifteenth centuries that decimated the population; banking failures led to increased Italian involvement and loss of Mediterranean market share; the textile trade foundered; and, most importantly, the civil war of 1462-72 left the Crown of Aragon "a war-torn country, shorn of two of its richest provinces [Cerdanya and Roussillon], and its problems all unsolved" (Elliott 37–41). In other words, the decadence of the Crown of Aragon led directly to the ascendance of Castile and the Habsburg empire.

During the time of the literary production of the Catalan baroque (approx. 1600–1740), the growing opposition to the Habsburg monarchy and its absolutist policies, especially under the Conde-Duque de Olivares’ regime. The Principality of Catalonia was a separate state of the monarchy with its own institutions (the Catalan Corts, Generalitat, Consell de Cent, etc.), liberties, exemptions, laws, and, of course, language. It was governed much like a colony, albeit a privileged one, yet one whose institutions and importance were being ignored if not openly attacked.

Since the Habsburg monarchy was more of a federation of separate kingdoms than an absolutely centralized system of power, Olivares ran into serious problems of troop recruitment and financing his frequent military endeavors, as evidenced by his "Unión de armas" project begun in 1624, which never came to fruition. The year 1640—which Olivares described as "el más infeliz que esta Monarquía ha alcanzado" [the worst that this Monarchy has suffered] in a memorial—saw revolts both in Catalonia and Portugal.

While the direct cause of the war was the billeting of Castilian troops in Catalonia for the war with France, it is clear that years of neglect for Catalan institutions and privileges also led to the conflict. Pau Claris declared Catalonia a republic under the protection of France in 1641. With further conflict looming on the horizon with the War of Succession that finally led to the abolition of all Catalan rights, privileges, and attempted to abolish the language itself with the Nueva Planta Decrees in 1714, these were dire times for Catalans; yet they were also times in which a new identity was being forged under the aegis of a new literary, linguistic, and national consciousness in which the writers of the baroque participated heavily. Writers such as Francesc Vicenç Garcia and Josep Romaguera wished to revitalize Catalan literary language by importing forms taken from the Castilian Baroque.

== Criticism ==
The ‘Decadència,’ however, refers to a period that is too conveniently capacious, as evidenced by Antoni Comas’ definition: "We call the period between the 15th-18th centuries the 'Decadence' in the field of Catalan literature or culture...it seems a dead period, but at the core is more lethargic than anything else" (La decadència 15) [translation]. Moreover, the most available English text on the subject is quite discouraging: Arthur Terry's A Companion to Catalan Literature devotes fifty-two pages to Medieval and early Renaissance literature, but only a total of eight to both the "Decadence" and the Enlightenment in Catalonia. Terry's text is symptomatic of larger currents of traditional literary history, for it highlights the dual evils of Castilian imitation and Baroque excess, the main reasons literature of the "Decadència" has been vilified by Catalan Literary Historians from Martí de Riquer and Joaquim Molas (1964–88) to Terry (2003).

Many literary historians are more interested in medieval or modern authors, starting from the nineteenth-century movement known as the Renaixença that led to the movements known as Noucentisme and Modernisme (see below). However, what these authors and recent critics have prized most in Catalan literature is, naturally, its autochthonous qualities or "catalanness"; in other words, either the folkloric or innovative nature of this literary production. By contrast, baroque Catalan literature is imitative, not innovative. Moreover, Catalan baroque literature, so influenced and infiltrated by Castilian, blurs linguistic boundaries and cannot support absolutist nation-building projects based on differentiation, political, literary or linguistic exceptionalism important to nineteenth-century thinkers in a way that modern or medieval literature could.

A new generation of scholars began to revise the prevailing views of early modern Catalan literature, even deliberately refusing to employ the term ‘Decadència’ in order to highlight its debilitating and contentious nature. Albert Rossich's article, "És valid avui el concepte de decadència de la cultura catalana a l’època moderna?" [Is the concept of the decadence of Catalan culture in the modern period valid today?], critically reexamines the so-called "Decadència" and concludes that it results from critics' own presuppositions. As a reconstructed fiction, "per provar que hi va haver una decadència cultural i literària hi ha d’haver ganes de veure-ho així" (128) [to prove that there was a cultural and literary decadence there must be a desire to see it so].

Another problem Rossich associates with traditional literary history and criticism is the basis of the appellation ‘decadence’ on the supposed lack of imaginative literature alone, eliminating from the analysis not only scientific and linguistic texts but also literature by Catalans in other languages. Moreover, for Rossich we err by eliding "conceptist" or "gongoresque" poetry because it imitates Castilian models, when these same poets consciously based themselves on forms previously imported from Italy—and, one might add, on the Valencian poet Ausiàs March, a known influence on Castilian authors writing in Castilian such as Juan Boscán and Garcilaso de la Vega.

Perhaps the worst problem with the narrative of the ‘Decadència’ is that it discourages people from studying the period to which it refers. The "decadence" of Catalan literature in the early modern period, therefore, depends on one's presuppositions and point of view. The "decadent" aspect of this period is in part a construction of the writers and critics of the Renaixença that aims at establishing a clear difference between the movements.

== Authors and works ==
Important authors writing in Catalan during the early modern period include Francesc Fontanella, Francesc Vicenç Garcia, and Josep Romaguera. Both Fontanella and Vicenç Garcia wrote theatrical and poetic works, including sonnet sequences, religious verse, and even erotica. Romaguera was renowned for his oratory skills, conserved in sermons published in Castilian, as well as the only book of emblems ever published in Catalan, the Atheneo de Grandesa (1681).

The earlier work Tirant lo Blanc by Joanot Martorell (1490) was specifically mentioned as the best chivalric romance by Miguel de Cervantes, in his Don Quixote (Part 1:1605, Part 2:1615), which had quite an influence on writers of the period. Other works of the early modern period include popular poetry such as goigs and broadside ballads.

== See also ==
- Act for the Immaculate Conception of Mary
- Catalan literature
- List of Catalan-language writers
