= Maria Antònia Salvà i Ripoll =

Mallorcan poet and translator

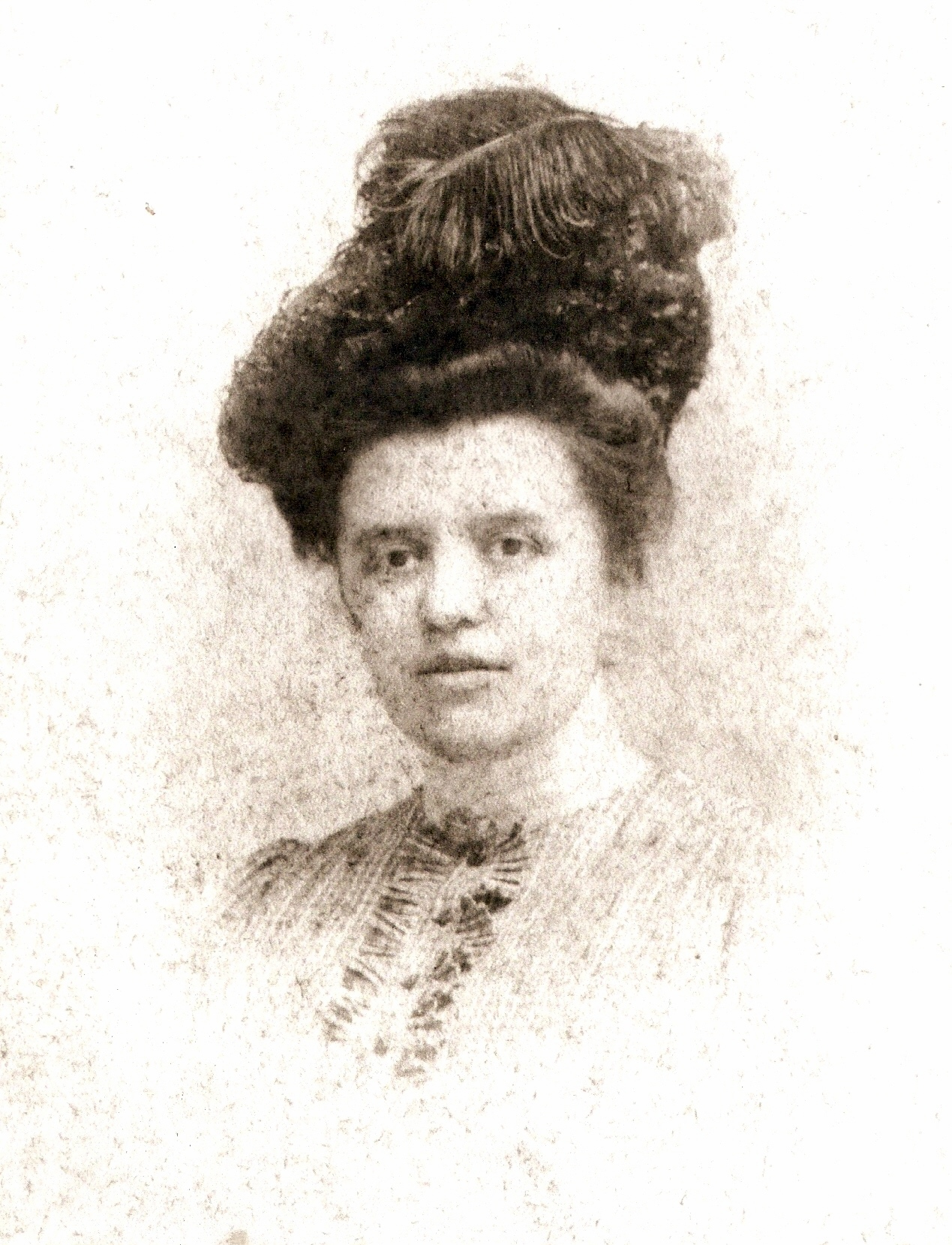
- Born: 4 November 1869; Palma de Mallorca, Spain
- Died: 29 January 1958 (aged 88); Llucmajor, Mallorca
- Notable work: Poesies
- Movement: Renaixença (Catalan Renaissance)
- Awards: 1st runner-up ca:Englantina d'or for La rosa dins la neu

Maria Antònia Salvà i Ripoll (1869 – 1958) was a Mallorcan poet and translator, and the sister of the politician Antoni Salvà i Ripoll and the painter Francesc Salvà Ripoll. She was the first female poet in the Catalan language.

Considered the first modern poet in the Catalan language and the first modern translator, she is linked to the Renaixença in Mallorca. She wrote poems such as "Espigues en flor" (1926), "El retorn" (1934), and "Lluneta del pagès" (1952), as well as works in prose, such as Viatge a Orient (1907) and Entre el record i l'enyorança (1955).

Salvà was described as "a poet who disguised herself as a translator" to find meaning in the male poetry of her time. Her translations were popular, and still are, in particular her 1917 version of Frédéric Mistral's Mireia (1859).

== Early life ==
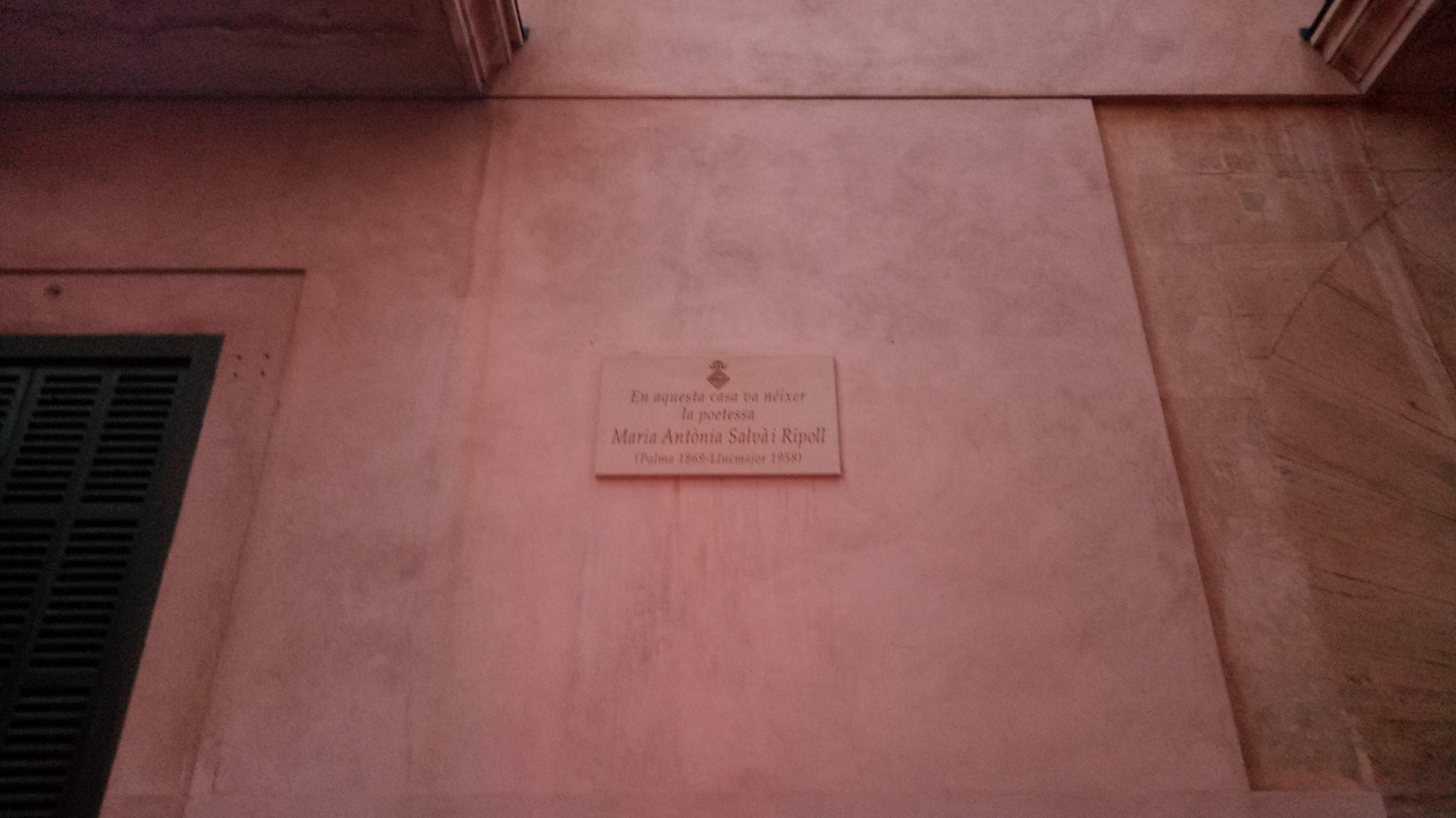
Plaque on the house in which Salvà was born, on Carrer d'en Morei.

Salvà was born on 4 November 1869 in Palma, the capital of the Balearic island of Mallorca. Her mother died when she was only a few months old, and Maria and her brother Antoni (b. 1868) were given to relatives in Llucmajor, while her eldest brother Francesc (b. 1867) was kept by their father and raised in Palma. From an early age, Salvà had a keen interest in poetry and language. In her memoir Between Memory and Longing she wrote: "My fondness for verse and songwriting could almost be said to be innate in me. My wet nurse, nicknamed Flauta, used to say that when I weaned, I already knew a string of songs".

At the age of six she met her father in Palma and was educated at the Col·legi de la Puresa. She began writing poems in Catalan at the age of 14 or 15; in these autobiographical poems, she shows an awareness of the exceptional nature with which she would have to experience writing in her youth and the first maturity of being a woman. At the age of sixteen she returned to Llucmajor, where she alternated between living at la Posada de la Llapassa (on Carrer Rei Jaume I in the town of Llucmajor) and at the la Llapassa estate. In Palma, however, her career grew through her father's acquaintances; she met with the intellectuals of the Renaixença in Mallorca and writers of Romantic poetry, including Josep Maria Quadrado, Pere d'Alcàntara Penya and, above all, the Costa i Llobera and Ferrà families, who would impact her literary career.

== Career ==
The renowned poet Miquel Costa i Llobera, who died in 1922, was her mentor early in her life. In her autobiographical book Entre el record i l'enyorança (1955), Salvà recounts how Costa i Llobera was influential in her life and how he served as her "protector and literary guide," providing her with books, introducing her to Mallorca's literary circles, and encouraging her to publish her first poems and translations.

In 1893 she became well known in Catalan magazines and continued to write until the publication of her first collection, Poesies, in 1910. At this time, Salvà was introduced to the government through a young Josep Carner and her name was shared in publications about the new century. Salvà also began writing in prose – notably a diary about her trip to the Holy Land in 1907 with Costa i Llobera – and translating. She then became invariably linked to poet Frédéric Mistral thanks to her translations of his works, especially Mireia (1917); these also made her the first literary translator of the modern era. She then expanded her translations into French and Italian. With this work, she was integrated into the Catalan literary corpus, along with figures like Francis Jammes, Alessandro Manzoni and Giovanni Pascoli.

In 1918, she received tribute in Palma from other Mallorcan writers and, presided over by Joan Alcover, joined with poets from other Catalan-speaking countries. In the 1920s, she found her most mature lyrical voice, a post-symbolist style like that of Marià Manent i Cisa. Salvà's poetry is linked to a contemplation of the nature of her native landscape. Overcoming Franco's Catalan censorship, the Editorial Moll publishing house began to print her complete works in 1948. Salvà became a reference for the new generations who visited Llucmajor in the 1940s and 1950s. At the time, in addition to Josep Carner, who considered her an extraordinary poet and fought to share her work, her most intimate personal and literary interlocutor was Miquel Ferrà "in whom she had full, unlimited confidence".

== Style ==
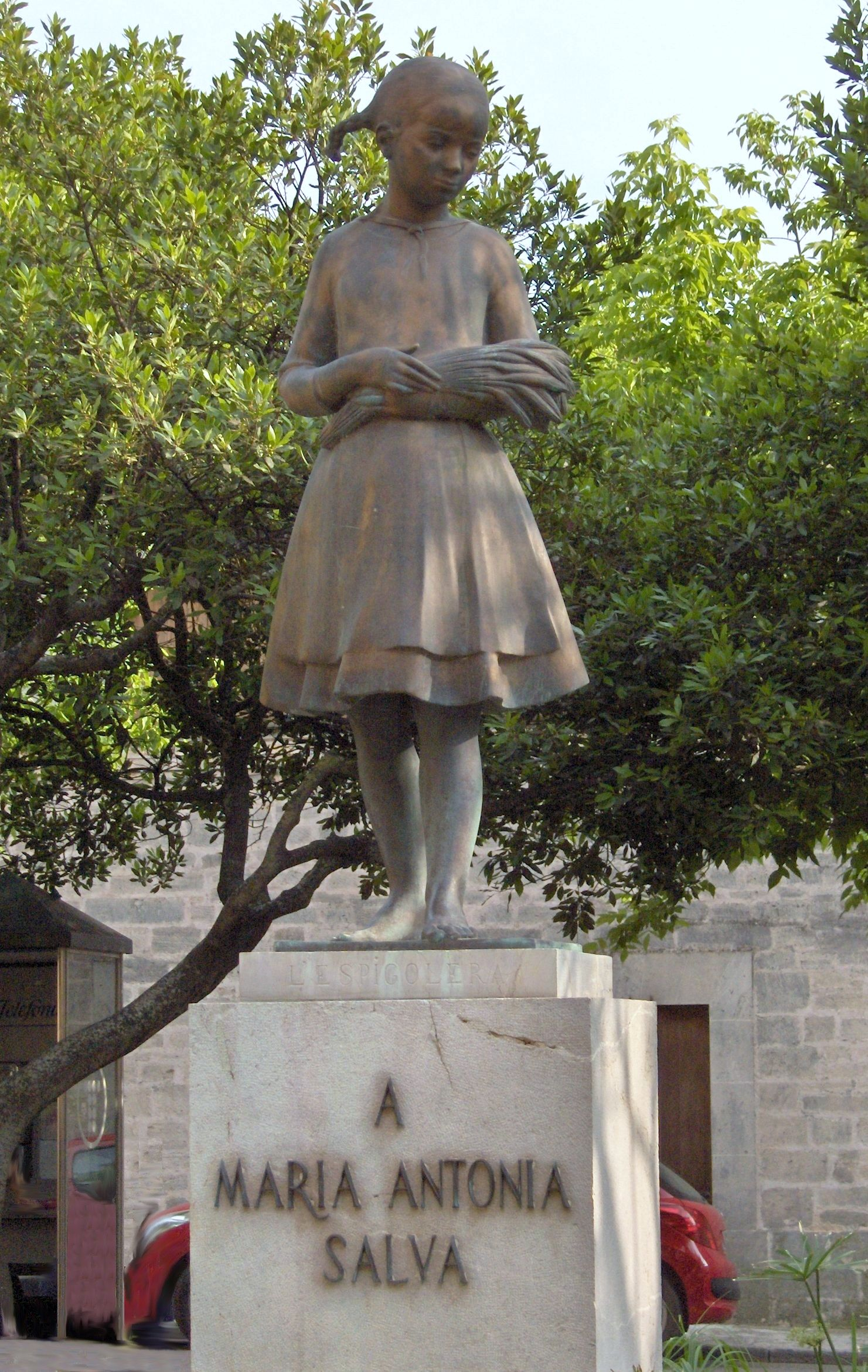
S'Espigolera. Monument to Maria Antònia Salvà in the plaza of the ca:Convent de Sant Bonaventura in Llucmajor.

Other writers describe her style as having a tidy sensibility. Josep Maria Llompart said that "it has been said that it cannot be by chance that the highest figure of the Mallorcan school [of language] is a woman. The taste for the reasons, for the tidy address, for the minor and delicate tone, united to the longing and inconcrete sensibility, is usually considered as a feminine quality. And this quality, typical of the school, substantially defines the poetry of Na Maria Antonia"; Carner said that her writing has "angelic tidiness, intimate complacency of everything in its place, with every emotion having a fitting and appropriate music. Maria Antònia brings us closer or more sensitized to that identification with beauty: splendor ordinis (the splendor of order) Traspua cel. her joy and her resentment and gives her voice a kind of caress and makes her spontaneity, nourished by select visions, occur in grace, and her stanzas, as the people would say, seem untouched".

Xesca Ensenyat spoke about Salvà's style in terms of its subject and identity, saying that "it has no aesthetic ideology or intellectual pretensions. It is a poetry of the daily anecdote that links with ruralism, which has been a constant in Catalan literature since the Renaissance".

=== Catalan exceptionalism ===
In 1935, Salvà presided over the Jocs Florals de Mallorca and gave a speech in which she defended Catalan identity and language; and in June 1936 she was one of the signatories of the Resposta als catalans. Several years later in 1939 she briefly spoke in support of Francoism because of its religiosity.

== Death ==
Salvà died at her childhood estate in Llucmajor on 29 January 1958, at the age of 88.

== Literary work ==
Her work focuses particularly on the landscape, the beauty of nature (see Espigues en flor (1926), for instance), as well as her native island of Mallorca and the Mediterranean; the latter embodied in her seminal translation of Mistral's Mireia (1917) or the memories of her trip to Palestine as stated in Viatge a Orient (1907).

In her autobiographical poems, she reveals an awareness that her writing is conditioned by the fact of being a woman. In the late 19th century, progress had been made regarding the condition of women. At the start of the industrial era, education was increasingly valued, and women were recognised for their role as educators of their children. While the role of motherhood was dignified, women were simultaneously placed in a dependent position, conceptualised as loving beings whose purpose was to love and sacrifice for their husband and family. Female writers themselves accepted this domestic role, acknowledging that their writing would always take a secondary place to household tasks. Within these constraints, society admitted women poets.

=== Bibliography ===
- Jocs de nins (1903)
- Viatge a Orient (1907) - Published in 1989
- Poesies (1910)
- Espigues en flor (1926)
- La rosa dins la neu (1931) (Jocs Florals de Barcelona, 1st runner-up for the ca:Englantina d'or)
- Mistral (1932) (Jocs Florals de Barcelona)
- De cara al pervindre. Mirèio (1932) (Jocs Florals de Barcelona)
- El retorn (1934)
- Llepolies i joguines (1946)
- Cel d'horabaixa (1948)
- Lluneta del pagès (1952)
- Entre el record i l'enyorança (1955), autobiography

=== Translations ===
- Frederic Mistral, "Les Illes d'or" (1910)
- Frederic Mistral, Mireia (1917)
- Andrée Bruguière de Gordot, "Dins les ruïnes d'Empúries. Sonets" (1918)
- Francis Jammes, "Les geòrgiques cristianes" (1918)
- Alessandro Manzoni, "Els promesos" (1923–24)
- Petrarca, Sis sonets de Petrarca en el VI Centenari del seu enamorament de Laura, 6 d'abril de 1327 (1928)
- Petrarca, In vita di madonna Laura. In morte di madonna Laura
- Santa Teresa de Jesús, Poemes de Santa Teresa de l'Infant Jesús (1945)
- Giovanni Pascoli, Poesies (1915–42) Published in 2002
- Poemes de Maria Antònia Salvà. Llibre de poemes orientat a infants amb il·lustracions de Pavla Reznicková publicat a El tinter dels clàssics. 21 Publicacions de l'Abadia de Montserrat (1990)
- She also translated Giosuè Carducci and Giacomo Leopardi in addition to numerous poetic compositions in various journals and those that remained unpublished, such as Pascoli's collection Poesies (2002).

== See also ==
- ca:sa Llapassa
- Cultural feminism
