= La Balanguera =

Regional anthem of Mallorca, Spain

English: The Balanguera
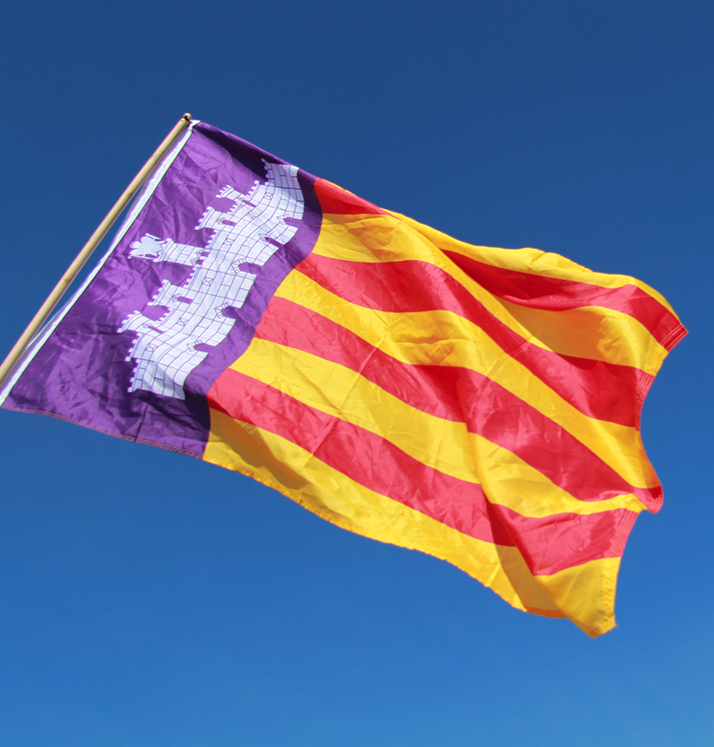
- Insular anthem of Mallorca, Balearic Islands, Spain
- Lyrics: Joan Alcover i Maspons
- Music: Amadeu Vives
- Adopted: 1996

Audio sample
- Official orchestral and choral/male vocal recording: file; help

"La Balanguera" (Balearic Catalan: [lə bələŋˈɡeɾə]) is the official anthem of the Balearic island of Mallorca, Spain. It is based on a poem by Joan Alcover i Maspons about an ancient Mallorcan children's song. The music is a work by Catalan composer Amadeu Vives, and in November 1996 the Consell Insular de Mallorca made it the anthem for the Island.

== Lyrics ==
Catalan original

I
La Balanguera misteriosa,
com una aranya d'art subtil,
buida que buida sa filosa,
de nostra vida treu el fil.
𝄆 Com una parca bé caviŀla
teixint la tela per demà
La Balanguera fila, fila,
la Balanguera filarà. 𝄇

II
Girant la ullada cap enrera
guaita les ombres de l'avior,
i de la nova primavera
sap on s'amaga la llavor.
𝄆 Sap que la soca més s'enfila
com més endins pot arrelar
La Balanguera fila, fila,
la Balanguera filarà. 𝄇

III
De tradicions i d'esperances
tix la senyera pel jovent
com qui fa un vel de noviances
amb cabelleres d'or i argent
𝄆 de la infantesa que s'enfila
de la vellura que se'n va.
La Balanguera fila, fila,
la Balanguera filarà. 𝄇

Balearic Catalan IPA

I
[ɫə bə.ɫəŋ.ˈɡe.ɾə mis̺.t̪ə.ɾiˈo.z̺ə]
[ˈkɔ̞m un̺‿əˈɾa.ɲ̟ə d̪aɾ s̺ut̪.ˈt̪iɫ]
[bui̯.ˈð̞a kə bui̯.ˈð̞a s̺ə fi.ˈɫo.z̺ə]
[d̪ə ˈn̺ɔ̞s̺.t̪ɾə ˈvi.ð̞ə t̪ɾɛ̞u̯ əɫ‿fiɫ]
𝄆 [ˈkɔ̞m ˈu.n̺ə ˈpaɾ.kə be kə.ˈviɫ.ɫə]
[t̪ə.ˈɕin ɫə ˈt̪ə.ɫə pəɾ ð̞ə.ˈma]
[ɫə bə.ɫəŋ.ˈɡe.ɾə ˈfi.ɫə ˈfi.ɫə]
[ɫə bə.ɫəŋ.ˈɡe.ɾə fi.ɫə.ˈɾa] 𝄇

II
[ʑiˈɾan̪ ɫə‿u.ˈʎ̟a.ð̞ə kap ən̺.ˈre.ɾə]
[ɡwəi̯ˈt̪a ɫəz̺‿ˈom.bɾəz̺ ð̞ə ɫə.viˈo]
[i ð̞ə ɫə ˈn̺ɔ̞.və pɾi.məˈve.ɾə]
[sap on̺ sə.ˈma.ɣ̞ə ɫə ʎ̟əˈvo]
𝄆 [sap kə ɫə ˈs̺ɔ̞.kə met̪‿t͡s̺əɱ.ˈfi.ɫa]
[kɔ̞m mes̺ ən̪ˈd̪ins̺ pɔ̞t̪ ə.r̺ə.ˈɫa]
[ɫə bə.ɫəŋ.ˈɡe.ɾə ˈfi.ɫə ˈfi.ɫə]
[ɫə bə.ɫəŋ.ˈɡe.ɾə fi.ɫə.ˈɾa] 𝄇

III
[d̪ə tɾə.ð̞i.s̺i.ˈons i ð̞əs.ˌpe.ˈɾan.s̺əs̺]
[t̪iɕ ɫə s̺ə.ˈɲ̟e.ɾə pəɫ ʑo.ˈven̪t̪]
[kɔ̞m ki fa uɱ‿vəɫ d̪ə nu.vi.ˈan.s̺əs̺]
[əm kə.bə.ˈe̯e.ɾəz̺ ð̞ɔ̞‿i əɾ.ˈʑen̪t̪]
𝄆 [d̪ə ɫə‿iɱ.fan̪.ˈtə.z̺ə kə səɱ.ˈfi.ɫə]
[d̪ə ɫə ˌveˈʎ̟u.ɾə kə s̺əɱ.ˈva]
[ɫə bə.ɫəŋ.ˈɡe.ɾə ˈfi.ɫə ˈfi.ɫə]
[ɫə bə.ɫəŋ.ˈɡe.ɾə fi.ɫə.ˈɾa] 𝄇

Spanish translation

I
La Balanguera misteriosa
como una araña de arte sutil,
vacía que vacía la rueca,
de nuestra vida saca el hilo.
𝄆 Como una parca que bien cavila,
tejiendo la tela para el mañana.
La Balanguera hila, hila,
la Balanguera hilará. 𝄇

II
Girando la vista hacia atrás
vigila las sombras del abolengo,
y de la nueva primavera
sabe donde se esconde la semilla.
𝄆 Sabe que la cepa más trepa
cuanto más profundo puede arraigar.
La Balanguera hila, hila,
la Balanguera hilará. 𝄇

III
De tradiciones y de esperanzas
teje la bandera para la juventud
como quien hace un velo de bodas
con cabellos de oro y plata
𝄆 de la infancia que trepa
de la vejez que se va
La Balanguera hila, hila,
la Balanguera hilará. 𝄇

English translation

I
O mysterious Balanguera,
like a spider of fine art,
her spinning wheel emptieth
and off our lives it pulleth.
𝄆 Like a Parca she pondereth,
and seweth well tomorrow’s cloth.
The Balanguera spinneth, spinneth
and the Balanguera shall spin. 𝄇

II
Her glimpse to the past she turneth,
O’er shades of ancestry she watcheth,
and of the new spring she owneth;
Of the seed’s cover she knoweth.
𝄆 She knoweth that the stump higher climbeth,
the deeper its roots can go.
The Balanguera spinneth, spinneth
and the Balanguera shall spin. 𝄇

III
From traditions and from hopes
The flag for the youth she weaveth
as one who a wedding veil prepareth
with hairs of gold and silver
𝄆 of the cradle that groweth
of the old age that departeth.
The Balanguera spinneth, spinneth
and the Balanguera shall spin. 𝄇
