= Mireia =

Mireia is a Catalan given name. It is a variant of the protagonist of the 1859 poem "Mirèio".

== People with the name ==
- Mireia Belmonte (born 1990), Catalan Olympic swimmer
- Mireia Boya Busquet (born 1979), Catalan scientist and politician
- Mireia Epelde (born 1985), Spanish racing cyclist
- Mireia García (born 1981), Catalan swimmer
- Mireia Gutiérrez (born 1988), Andorran Olympic skier
- Mireia Lalaguna (born 1992), Catalan actress and model
- Mireia Miró Varela (born 1988), Catalan ski mountaineer and long-distance runner
- Mireia Riera Casanovas, Catalan swimmer
- Mireia Vehí (born 1985), Catalan politician

== See also ==
- Mireia (beetle), a genus of flower chafer beetles
- Miriam (given name)
