= Immaculate Conception =

Teaching that Mary was conceived free from original sin

Our Lady of the Immaculate Conception
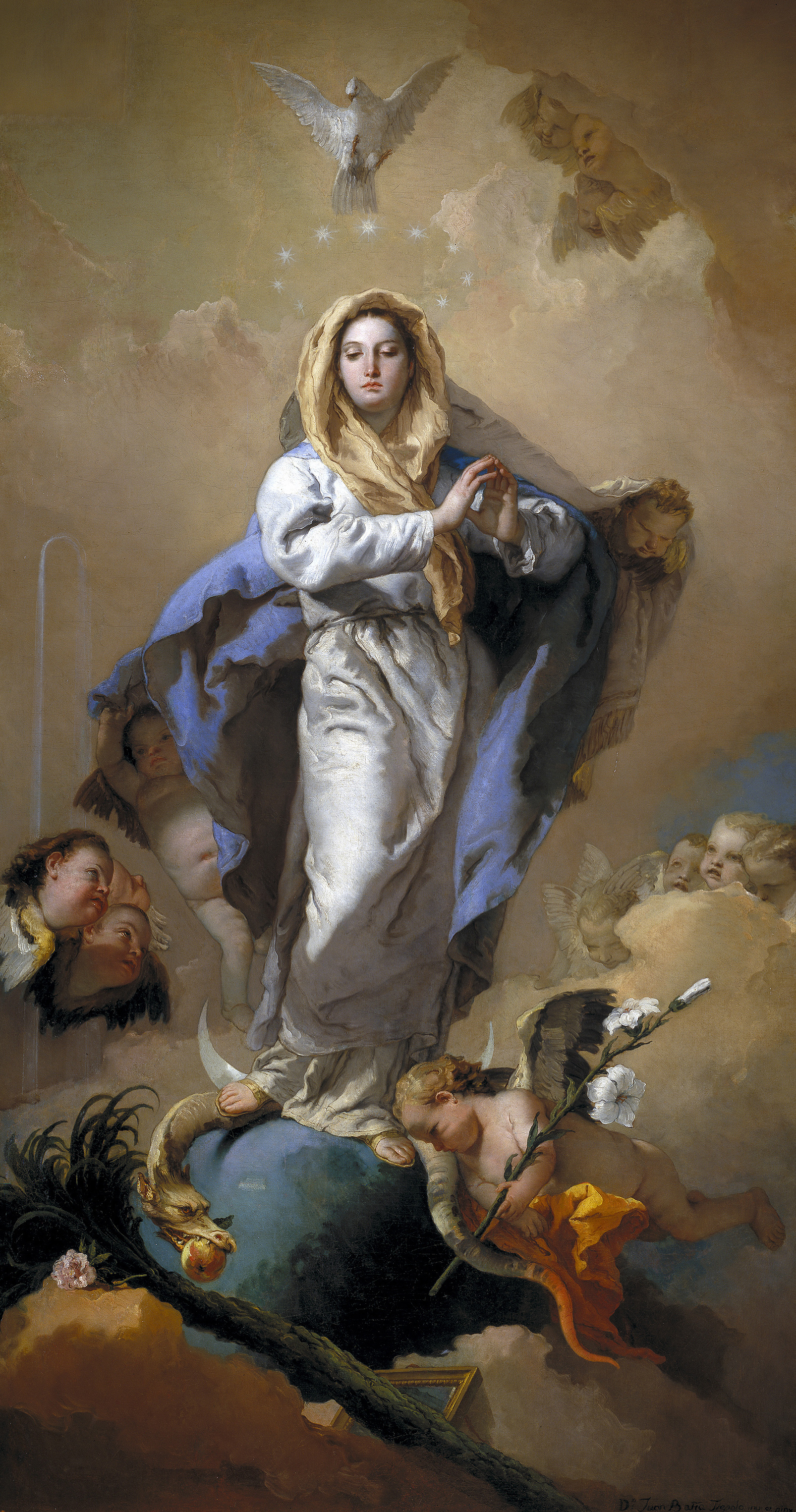
- The Immaculate Conception (1767–1769) by Giovanni Battista Tiepolo
- Venerated in: Catholic Church; Ethiopian Orthodox Tewahedo Church; Eritrean Orthodox Tewahedo Church
- Major shrine: Basilica of the National Shrine of the Immaculate Conception
- Feast: December 8 (Latin liturgical rites); December 9 (Byzantine Rite); August 13 (Alexandrian Rite)
- Attributes: Crescent moon; halo of twelve stars; blue robe; putti; serpent underfoot; Assumption into heaven
- Patronage: See Patronages of the Immaculate Conception

The Immaculate Conception is the doctrine that the Virgin Mary was free of original sin from the moment of her conception. It is one of the four Marian dogmas of the Catholic Church. Debated by medieval theologians, it was not defined as a dogma until 1854, by Pope Pius IX in the papal bull Ineffabilis Deus. While the Immaculate Conception asserts Mary's freedom from original sin, the Council of Trent, held between 1545 and 1563, had previously non-dogmatically affirmed her freedom from personal sin.

While they have different theological emphases, the Eastern Catholic Churches, just like the Latin Church, fully affirm the dogma.

The Immaculate Conception became a popular subject in literature, but its abstract nature meant it was late in appearing as a subject in works of art. The iconography of Our Lady of the Immaculate Conception shows Mary standing, with arms outstretched or hands clasped in prayer. The feast day of the Immaculate Conception is December 8.

Many Protestant churches rejected the doctrine of the Immaculate Conception as unscriptural, though some Anglicans accept it as a pious devotion.

The Eastern Orthodox Church rejects the doctrine. The teaching on the Immaculate Conception among the Oriental Orthodox churches varies: Shenouda III, Pope of the Coptic Orthodox Church, and the Patriarch Ignatius Zakka I of the Syriac Orthodox Church opposed the teaching, while the Eritrean Orthodox Tewahedo Church and Ethiopian Orthodox Tewahedo Church accept it.

== History ==
=== Anne, mother of Mary, and original sin ===
Anne, the mother of Mary, first appears in the 2nd-century apocryphal Gospel of James. The author of the gospel borrowed from Greek tales of the childhood of heroes. For Jesus' grandmother the author drew on the more benign biblical story of Hannah—hence Anna—who conceived Samuel in her old age, thus reprising the miraculous birth of Jesus with a merely remarkable one for his mother. Anne and her husband, Joachim, are infertile, but God hears their prayers and Mary is conceived. According to Stephen J. Shoemaker, within the Gospel of James, the conception occurs without sexual intercourse between Anne and Joachim, which fits well with the Gospel of James' persistent emphasis on Mary's sacred purity, but the story does not advance the idea of an immaculate conception. The author of the Gospel of James may have based this account of Mary's conception on that of John the Baptist as recounted in the Gospel of Luke. The Eastern Orthodox Church holds that "Mary is conceived by her parents as we are all conceived".

=== Church Fathers ===
According to church historian Frederick Holweck, writing in the Catholic Encyclopedia, Justin Martyr, Irenaeus, and Cyril of Jerusalem developed the idea of Mary as the New Eve, drawing comparison to Eve, while yet immaculate and incorrupt – that is to say, not subject to original sin. Holweck adds that Ephrem the Syrian said she was as innocent as Eve before the Fall.

Ambrose asserted Mary's incorruptibility, attributing her virginity to grace and immunity from sin. Severus, Bishop of Antioch, concurred affirming Mary's purity and immaculateness. John Damascene extended the supernatural influence of God to Mary's parents, suggesting they were purified by the Holy Spirit during her generation. According to Damascene, even the material of Mary's origin was deemed pure and holy. This perspective, which emphasized an immaculate active generation and the sanctity of the conceptio carnis, found resonance among some Western authors. Notably, the Greek Fathers did not explicitly discuss the Immaculate Conception.

=== Medieval formulation ===
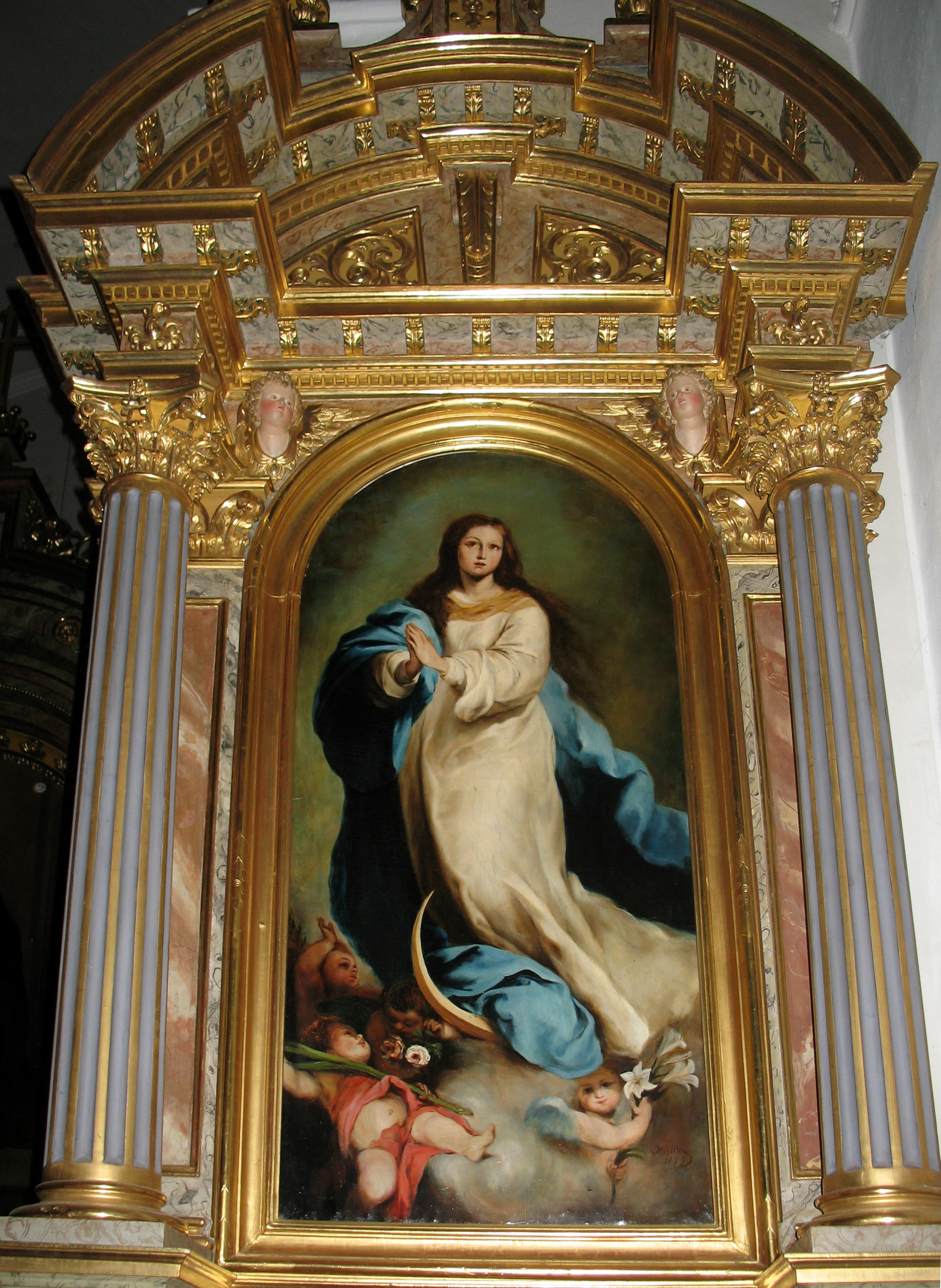
Altar of the Immaculata by Joseph Lusenberg, 1876, representing Our Lady of the Immaculate Conception, at Saint Antony's Church, Urtijëi, Italy

By the 4th century the idea that Mary was free from sin was generally more widespread, but original sin raised the question of whether she was also free of the sin passed down from Adam. The question became acute when the feast of her conception began to be celebrated in England in the 11th century, and the question of inherited sin was raised in regard to Mary's state. The feast of Mary's conception originated in the Eastern Church in the 7th century, reached England in the 11th, and from there spread to Europe, where it was given official approval in 1477 and extended to the whole church in 1693; the word "immaculate" was not officially added to the name of the feast until 1854.

The doctrine of the Immaculate Conception caused a virtual civil war between Franciscans and Dominicans during the Middle Ages, with Franciscan 'Scotists' in its favour and Dominican 'Thomists' against it. The English ecclesiastic and scholar Eadmer (c. 1060 – c. 1126) reasoned that it was possible that Mary was conceived without original sin in view of God's omnipotence, and that it was also appropriate in view of her role as Mother of God: Potuit, decuit, fecit, "it was possible, it was fitting, therefore it was done". Others, including Bernard of Clairvaux (1090–1153) and Thomas Aquinas (1225–1274), objected that if Mary were free of original sin at her conception then she would have no need of redemption, making Christ's saving redemption superfluous; they were answered by Duns Scotus (1264–1308), who "developed the idea of preservative redemption as being a more perfect one: to have been preserved free from original sin was a greater grace than to be set free from sin".

In 1439, the Council of Basel, in schism with Pope Eugene IV who resided at the Council of Florence, declared the Immaculate Conception a "pious opinion" consistent with faith and Scripture; the Council of Trent, held in several sessions in the early 1500s, made no explicit declaration on the subject but exempted her from the universality of original sin, affirming she remained during all her life free from all stain of sin, even the venial one; by 1571 the revised Roman Breviary set out an elaborate celebration of the Feast of the Immaculate Conception on 8 December.

=== Popular devotion and Ineffabilis Deus ===
According to Patrizia Granziera, the creation of the dogma was slow and elaborate and it was more the fruit of popular devotion than scholarly. The Immaculate Conception became a popular subject in literature and art, and some devotees went so far as to hold that Anne had conceived Mary by kissing her husband Joachim, and that Anne's father and grandmother had likewise been conceived without sexual intercourse, although Bridget of Sweden (c. 1303–1373) told how Mary herself had revealed to her that Anne and Joachim conceived their daughter through a sexual union which was sinless because it was pure and free of sexual lust.

In the 16th and especially the 17th centuries there was a proliferation of Immaculatist devotion in Spain, leading the Habsburg monarchs to demand that the papacy elevate the belief to the status of dogma. In France in 1830 Catherine Labouré (May 2, 1806 – December 31, 1876) saw a vision of Mary standing on a globe while a voice commanded her to have a medal made in imitation of what she saw. The medal said "O Mary, conceived without sin, pray for us who have recourse to thee". Labouré's vision was perceived by supporters as a confirmation from Mary herself that she was conceived without sin: it marked the beginning of a great 19th-century Marian revival. The bishops of Bohemia wrote to Pope Gregory XVI in February 1845 seeking pontifical approval for Mary's veneration as having been conceived without original sin, and the Pope replied the following April confirming that the liturgy honouring the Virgin Mary would henceforth refer to the doctrine proclaiming her conception to have been "immaculate".

In 1849 Pope Pius IX issued the encyclical letter Ubi primum soliciting the bishops of the church for their views on whether the doctrine should be defined as dogma; ninety percent of those who responded were supportive, although the Archbishop of Paris, Marie-Dominique-Auguste Sibour, in his answer to Pope Pius IX, warned that the Immaculate Conception "could be proved neither from the Scriptures nor from tradition". Despite this, he was present at the promulgation of the decree and shortly afterwards solemnly published it in his own diocese. The dogma was finally proclaimed on 8 December 1854 in the apostolic constitution Ineffabilis Deus.

We declare, pronounce, and define that the doctrine which holds that the most Blessed Virgin Mary, in the first instance of her conception, by a singular grace and privilege granted by Almighty God, in view of the merits of Jesus Christ, the Saviour of the human race, was preserved free from all stain of original sin, is a doctrine revealed by God and therefore to be believed firmly and constantly by all the faithful.

Dom Prosper Guéranger, Abbot of Solesmes Abbey, who had been one of the main promoters of the dogmatic statement, wrote Mémoire sur l'Immaculée Conception, explaining what he saw as its basis:

For the belief to be defined as a dogma of faith [...] it is necessary that the Immaculate Conception form part of Revelation, expressed in Scripture or Tradition, or be implied in beliefs previously defined. Needed, afterward, is that it be proposed to the faith of the faithful through the teaching of the ordinary magisterium. Finally, it is necessary that it be attested by the liturgy, and the Fathers and Doctors of the Church.

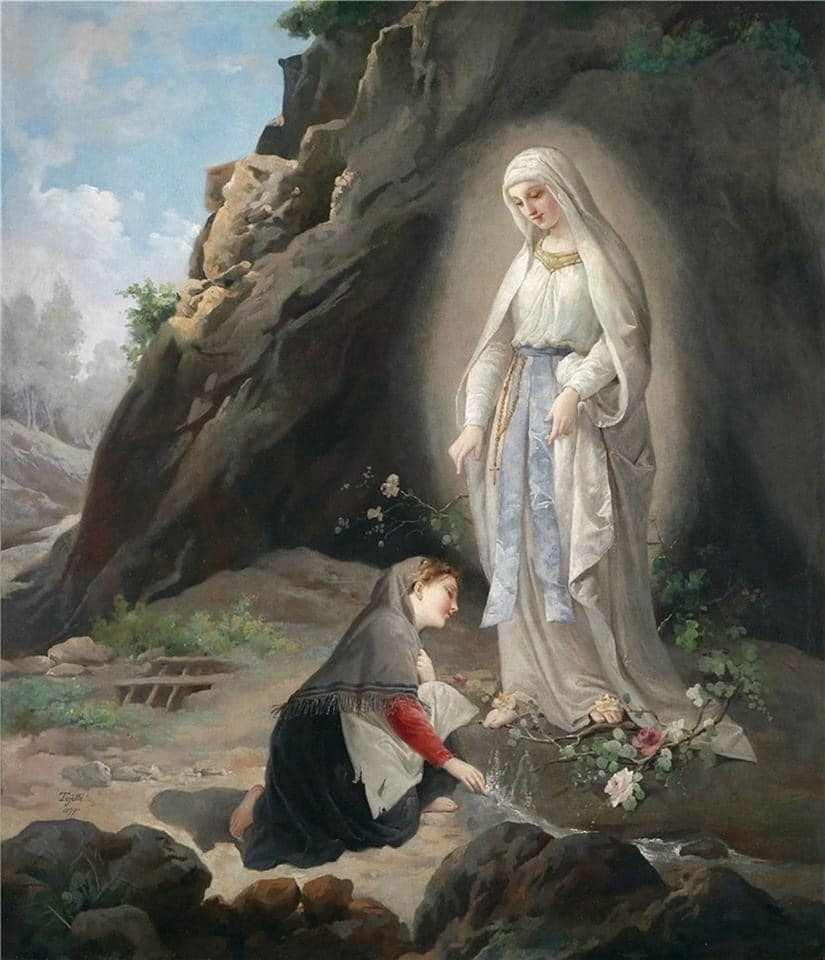
Our Lady of Lourdes's 9th apparition, 25 February 1858, by Virgilio Tojett (1877), after Bernadette Soubirous' description. Soubirous claimed the Lady identified herself as the "Immaculate Conception".

Guéranger maintained that these conditions were met and that the definition was therefore possible. Ineffabilis Deus found the Immaculate Conception in the Ark of Salvation (Noah's Ark), Jacob's Ladder, the Burning Bush at Sinai, the Enclosed Garden from the Song of Songs, and many more passages. From this wealth of support the pope's advisors singled out Genesis 3:15: "The most glorious Virgin ... was foretold by God when he said to the serpent: 'I will put enmity between you and the woman,'" a prophecy which reached fulfilment in the figure of the Woman in the Revelation of John, crowned with stars and trampling the Dragon underfoot. Luke 1:28, and specifically the phrase "full of grace" by which Gabriel greeted Mary, was another reference to her Immaculate Conception: "she was never subject to the curse and was, together with her Son, the only partaker of perpetual benediction".

Ineffabilis Deus was one of the pivotal events of the papacy of Pius, pope from 16 June 1846 to his death on 7 February 1878. Four years after the proclamation of the dogma, in 1858, the young Bernadette Soubirous said that Mary appeared to her at Lourdes in southern France, to announce that she was the Immaculate Conception; the Catholic Church later endorsed the apparition as authentic. There are other (approved) Marian apparitions in which Mary identified herself as the Immaculate Conception, for example Our Lady of Gietrzwald in 1877, Poland.

== Feast, patronages and disputes ==
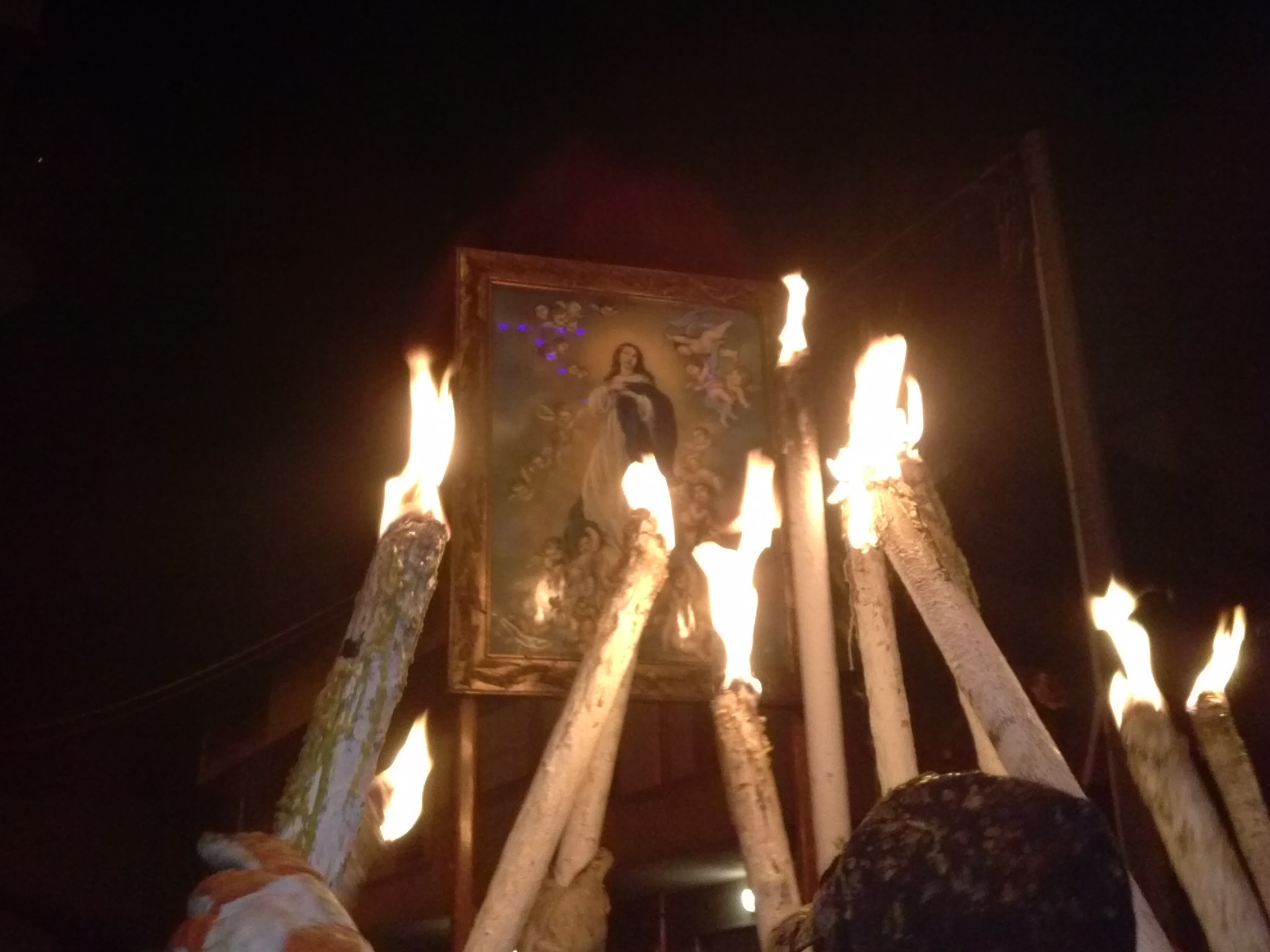
The procession of the Quadrittu of the Immaculate Conception taken on December 7 in Saponara, Sicily

The feast day of the Immaculate Conception is December 8. The Roman Missal and the Roman Rite Liturgy of the Hours include references to Mary's immaculate conception in the feast of the Immaculate Conception. Its celebration seems to have begun in the Eastern church in the 7th century and may have spread to Ireland by the 8th, although the earliest well-attested record in the Western church is from England early in the 11th. It was suppressed there after the Norman Conquest (1066), and the first thorough exposition of the doctrine was a response to this suppression. It continued to spread through the 15th century despite accusations of heresy from the Thomists and strong objections from several prominent theologians.

Beginning around 1140 Bernard of Clairvaux, a Cistercian monk, wrote to Lyons Cathedral to express his surprise and dissatisfaction that it had recently begun to be observed there, but in 1477 Pope Sixtus IV, a Franciscan Scotist and devoted Immaculist, placed it on the Roman calendar (i.e., list of church festivals and observances) via the bull Cum praexcelsa. Thereafter in 1481 and 1483, in response to the polemic writings of the prominent Thomist, Vincenzo Bandello, Pope Sixtus IV published two more bulls which forbade anybody to preach or teach against the Immaculate Conception, or for either side to accuse the other of heresy, on pains of excommunication.

Pope Pius V kept the feast on the Tridentine calendar but suppressed the word "immaculate". Gregory XV in 1622 prohibited any public or private assertion that Mary was conceived in sin. Urban VIII in 1624 allowed the Franciscans to establish a military order dedicated to the Virgin of the Immaculate Conception. Following the promulgation of Ineffabilis Deus the typically Franciscan phrase "immaculate conception" reasserted itself in the title and euchology (prayer formulae) of the feast. Pius IX solemnly promulgated a mass formulary drawn chiefly from one composed 400 years earlier by a papal chamberlain at the behest of Sixtus IV, beginning "O God who by the Immaculate Conception of the Virgin".

== Prayers and hymns ==
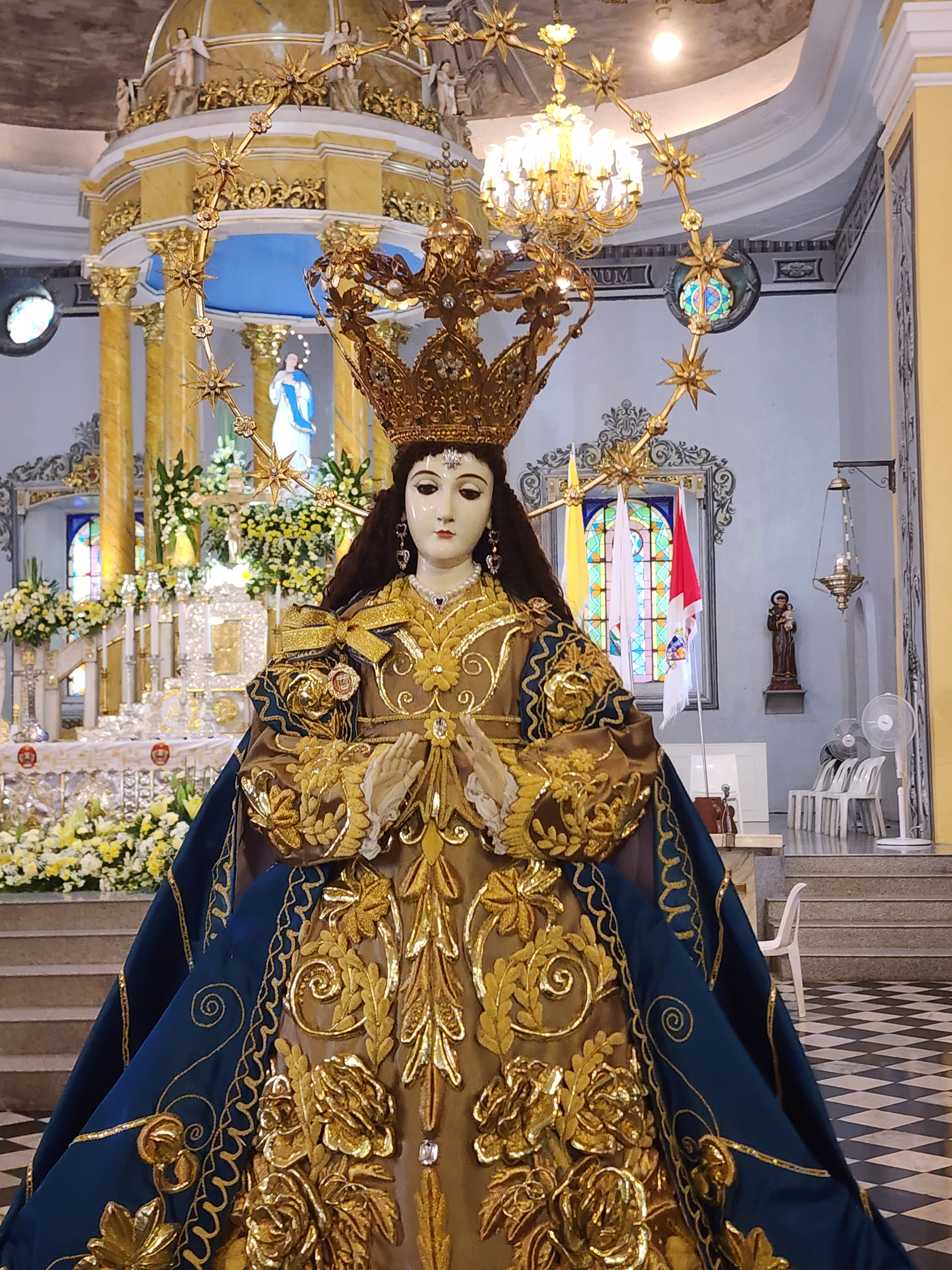
The venerated ivory image of the Immaculate Conception of Batangas City, Philippines, pontifically crowned on December 8, 2022

The Roman Rite liturgical books, including the Roman Missal and the Liturgy of the Hours, included offices venerating Mary's immaculate conception on the feast of the Immaculate Conception. An example is the antiphon that begins: "Tota pulchra es, Maria, et macula originalis non est in te" ("You are all beautiful, Mary, and the original stain [of sin] is not in you". It continues: "Your clothing is white as snow, and your face is like the sun. You are all beautiful, Mary, and the original stain [of sin] is not in you. You are the glory of Jerusalem, you are the joy of Israel, you give honour to our people. You are all beautiful, Mary".) On the basis of the original Gregorian chant music, polyphonic settings have been composed by Anton Bruckner, Pablo Casals, Maurice Duruflé, Grzegorz Gerwazy Gorczycki, Ola Gjeilo, José Maurício Nunes Garcia, and Nikolaus Schapfl.

Other prayers honouring Mary's immaculate conception are in use outside the formal liturgy. The Immaculata prayer, composed by Maximillian Kolbe, is a prayer of entrustment to Mary as the Immaculata. A novena of prayers, with a specific prayer for each of the nine days has been composed under the title of the Immaculate Conception Novena.

Ave Maris Stella is the vesper hymn of the feast of the Immaculate Conception. The hymn Immaculate Mary, addressed to Mary as the Immaculately Conceived One, is closely associated with Lourdes.

The Loreto Litanies included the official Latin Marian title of Regina sine labe originali concepta (Queen conceived without original sin), which had been granted by Pope Gregory XVI (1831-1846) from 1839 onwards to some dioceses, thus several years before the proclamation of the dogma.

== Artistic representation ==
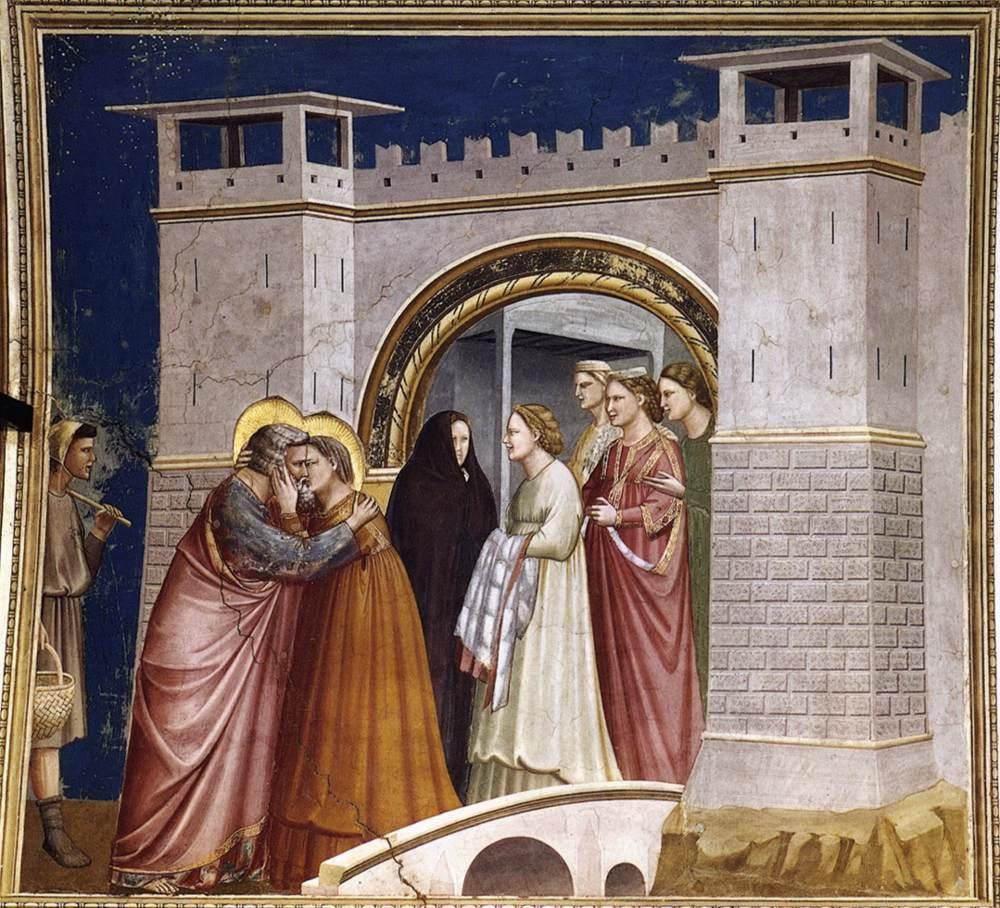
Giotto, Meeting at the Golden Gate, 1304–1306

The Immaculate Conception became a popular subject in literature, but its abstract nature meant it was late in appearing as a subject in art. During the Medieval period it was depicted as "Joachim and Anne Meeting at the Golden Gate", meaning Mary's conception through the chaste kiss of her parents at the Golden Gate in Jerusalem; the 14th and 15th centuries were the heyday for this scene, after which it was gradually replaced by more allegorical depictions featuring an adult Mary.

The definitive iconography for the depiction of "Our Lady of the Immaculate Conception" seems to have been finally established by the painter and theorist Francisco Pacheco in his "El arte de la pintura" of 1649: a beautiful young girl of 12 or 13, wearing a white tunic and blue mantle, rays of light emanating from her head ringed by twelve stars and crowned by an imperial crown, the Sun behind her and the Moon beneath her feet. Pacheco's iconography influenced other Spanish artists or artists active in Spain such as El Greco, Bartolomé Murillo, Diego Velázquez, and Francisco Zurbarán, who each produced a number of artistic masterpieces based on the use of these same symbols. The popularity of this particular representation of The Immaculate Conception spread across the rest of Europe, and has since remained the best known artistic depiction of the concept: in a heavenly realm, moments after her creation, the spirit of Mary (in the form of a young woman) looks up in awe at (or bows her head to) God. The Moon is under her feet and a halo of twelve stars surround her head, possibly a reference to "a woman clothed with the sun" from Revelation 12:1–2. Additional imagery may include clouds, a golden light, and putti. In some paintings the putti are holding lilies and roses, flowers often associated with Mary.

== Other denominations ==
=== Oriental Orthodoxy ===
The Ethiopian Orthodox Tewahedo and Eritrean Orthodox Tewahedo Churches believe in the Immaculate Conception of the Theotokos. The Ethiopic phrase used to express that the Blessed Virgin Mary is free from original sin is "መርገመ ስጋ መርገመ ነፍስ የሌለባት". The Ethiopian Orthodox Tewahedo Church celebrates the Feast of the Immaculate Conception on Nehasie 7 (August 13). The proposition of Ethiopian Orthodox reads: "Our Lady, the Virgin Mary, who conceived and gave birth to Jesus Christ in virginity is free from the original sin derived from the descendants of Adam, clean from any sins of the flesh and soul; embedded in the conscience of God before the time of her birth, free and protected from human desires and frailties, and the choicest from among the chosen. Such is the Virgin Mary – Pure and Holy of Holies. (Song 4.7)". This is a synodal statement.

=== Eastern Orthodoxy ===
Eastern Orthodox theology does not profess Mary's exemption from original sin but does affirm Mary's purity and preservation from personal sin.

In 1894, when Pope Leo XIII addressed the Eastern church in his encyclical Praeclara gratulationis, Ecumenical Patriarch Anthimos, in 1895, replied with an encyclical approved by the Constantinopolitan Synod in which he stigmatised the dogmas of the Immaculate Conception and papal infallibility as "Roman novelties" and called on the Roman church to return to the faith of the early centuries. Eastern Orthodox Bishop Kallistos Ware comments that "the Latin dogma seems to us not so much erroneous as superfluous".

=== Old Catholics ===
In the mid-19th century, some Catholics who were unable to accept the doctrine of papal infallibility left the Roman Church and formed the Old Catholic Church. This movement rejects the Immaculate Conception.

=== Protestantism ===
Protestants overwhelmingly condemned the promulgation of Ineffabilis Deus as an exercise in papal power, and the doctrine itself as unscriptural, for it denied that all had sinned and rested on the Latin translation of Luke 1:28 (the "full of grace" passage) that the original Greek did not support. Protestants, therefore, teach that Mary was a sinner saved through grace, like all believers.

The Catholic–Lutheran dialogue's statement The One Mediator, the Saints, and Mary, issued in 1990 after seven years of study and discussion, conceded that Lutherans and Catholics remained separated "by differing views on matters such as the invocation of saints, the Immaculate Conception and the Assumption of Mary"; the final report of the Anglican–Roman Catholic International Commission (ARCIC), created in 1969 to further ecumenical progress between the Catholic Church and the Anglican Communion, similarly recorded the disagreement of the Anglicans with the doctrine, although Anglo-Catholics may hold the Immaculate Conception as an optional pious belief.

== See also ==
- Feast of the Immaculate Conception
- Feast of the Conception of the Virgin Mary
- Act for the Immaculate Conception of Mary
- Cathedral of the Immaculate Conception (disambiguation)
- Church of the Immaculate Conception (disambiguation)
- Patronages of the Immaculate Conception
- Congregation of the Immaculate Conception
- Marian doctrines of the Catholic Church
- Marian Fathers of the Immaculate Conception
- Catholic Mariology
- Perpetual virginity of Mary
