= Atheneo de Grandesa =

Catalan-language book

The Atheneo de Grandesa (Catalan pronunciation: [ətəˈnɛw ðə ɣɾənˈdɛzə], modern spelling Ateneu de Grandesa) is an emblem book written in the Catalan language by Josep Romaguera and published in 1681 by the printer Joan Jolis in Barcelona. It contains 15 engravings by an unknown artist.

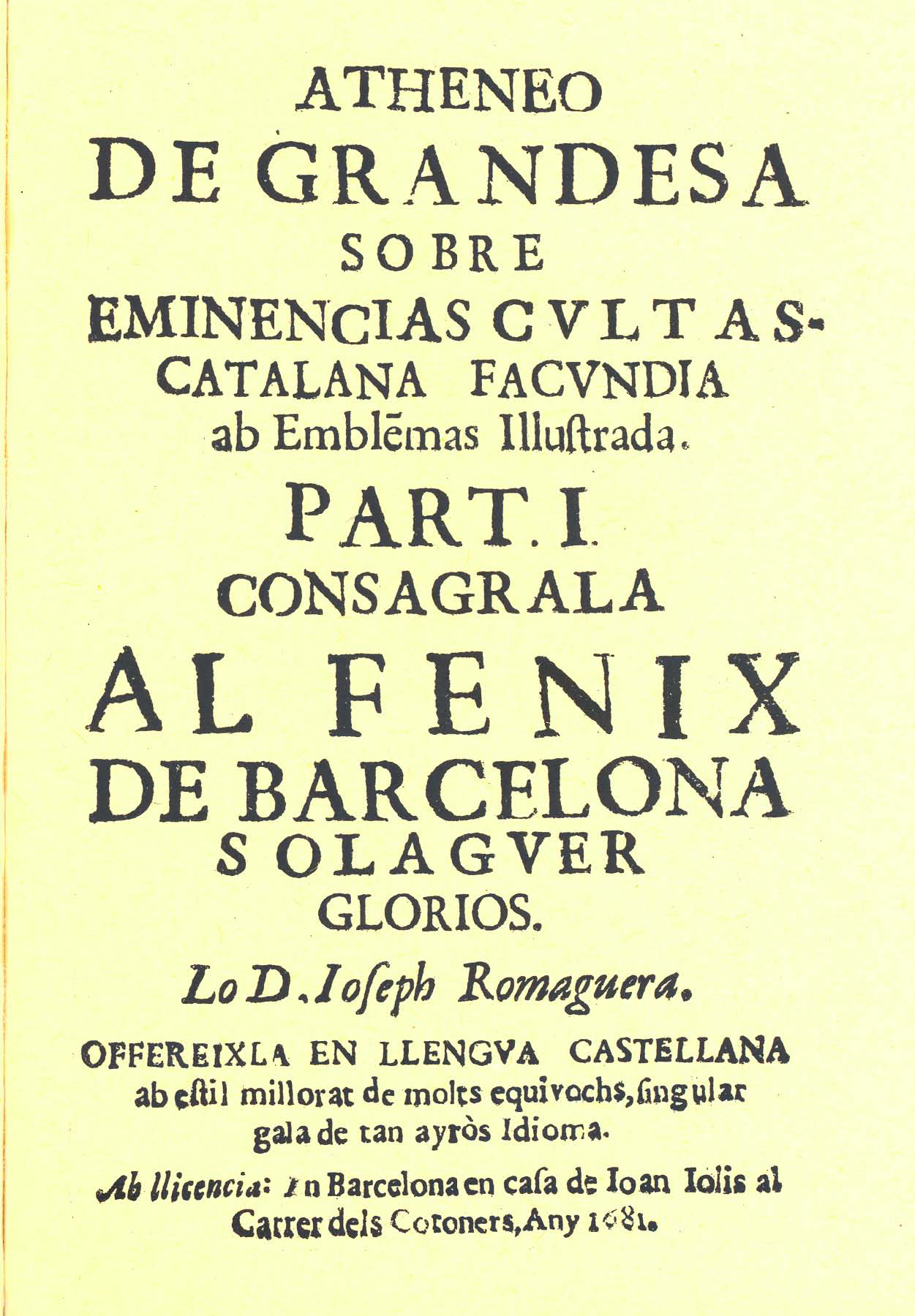
Title Page of the Atheneo

== Structure ==
Because the book was printed under censorship from the Inquisition, the preliminary materials include the ecclesiastical imprimatur. The text is dedicated to the former bishop of Barcelona, Saint Olaguer.

The text's prologue is perhaps the most well-known fragment, since it defends Catalan as a literary language in a time when Castilian was a more frequent vehicle for literature in Spain. Romaguera's vindication of the use of literary Catalan was appreciated and cited throughout the eighteenth century in Catalonia before the more successful Renaixença of the 19th century, though the actual prose and poetry in the Atheneo were not.

The bulk of the Atheneo is in the form of a prose treatise, much in the style of Baltasar Gracián, and is divided into 14 chapters called "eminèncias." Each chapter contains several pages of prose followed by an emblem, which is in turned explained by a poetic gloss. In general, the chapters discuss ways of bettering oneself and striving at individual perfection. The prose is rich (or dense, depending on the viewpoint) and allusive. Romaguera's poems have been widely anthologized in Catalan textbooks as he is one of only a few Baroque poets.

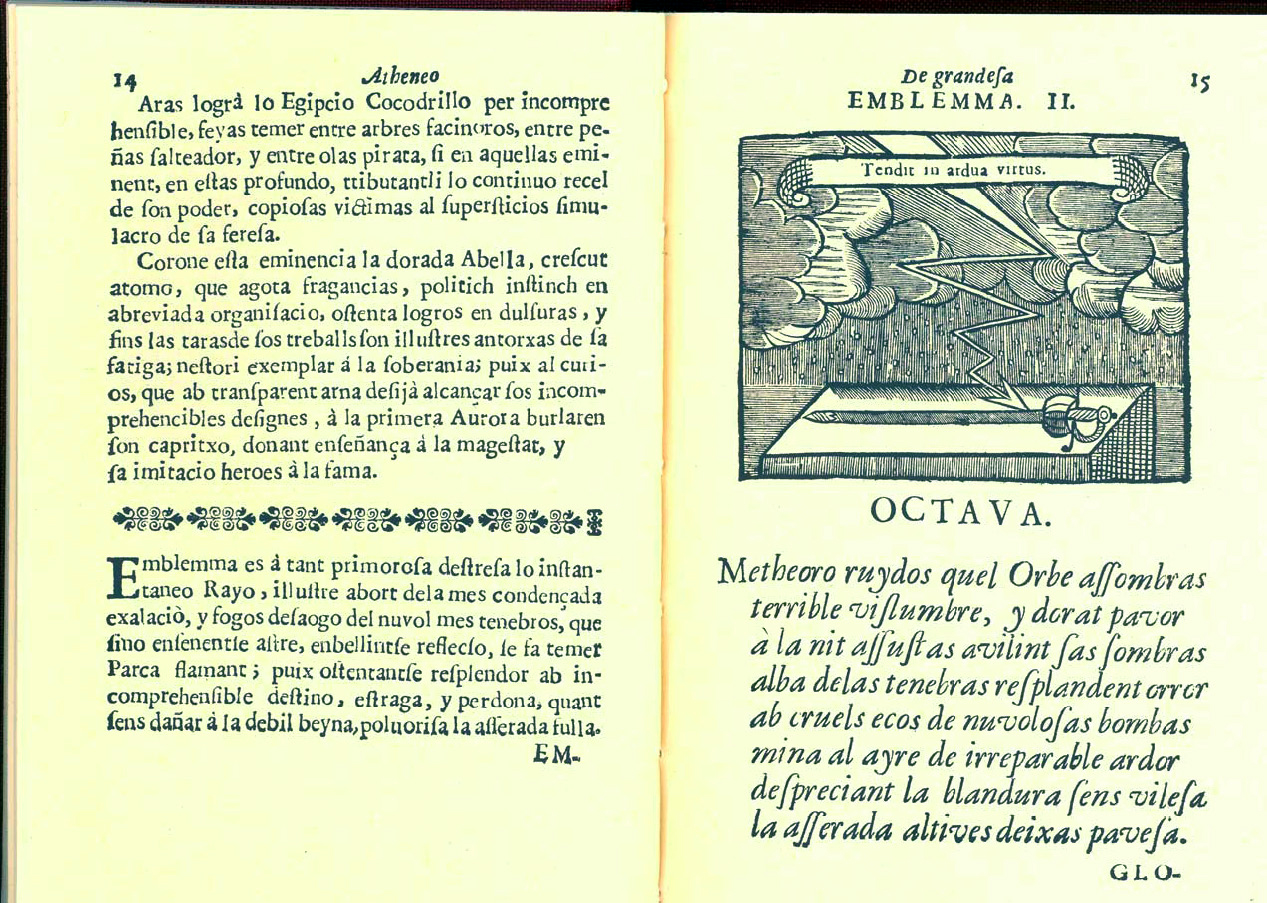
An Emblem from the Atheneo de grandesa with poetic gloss

== See also ==
- Catalan literature
