= Francesc Fontanella =

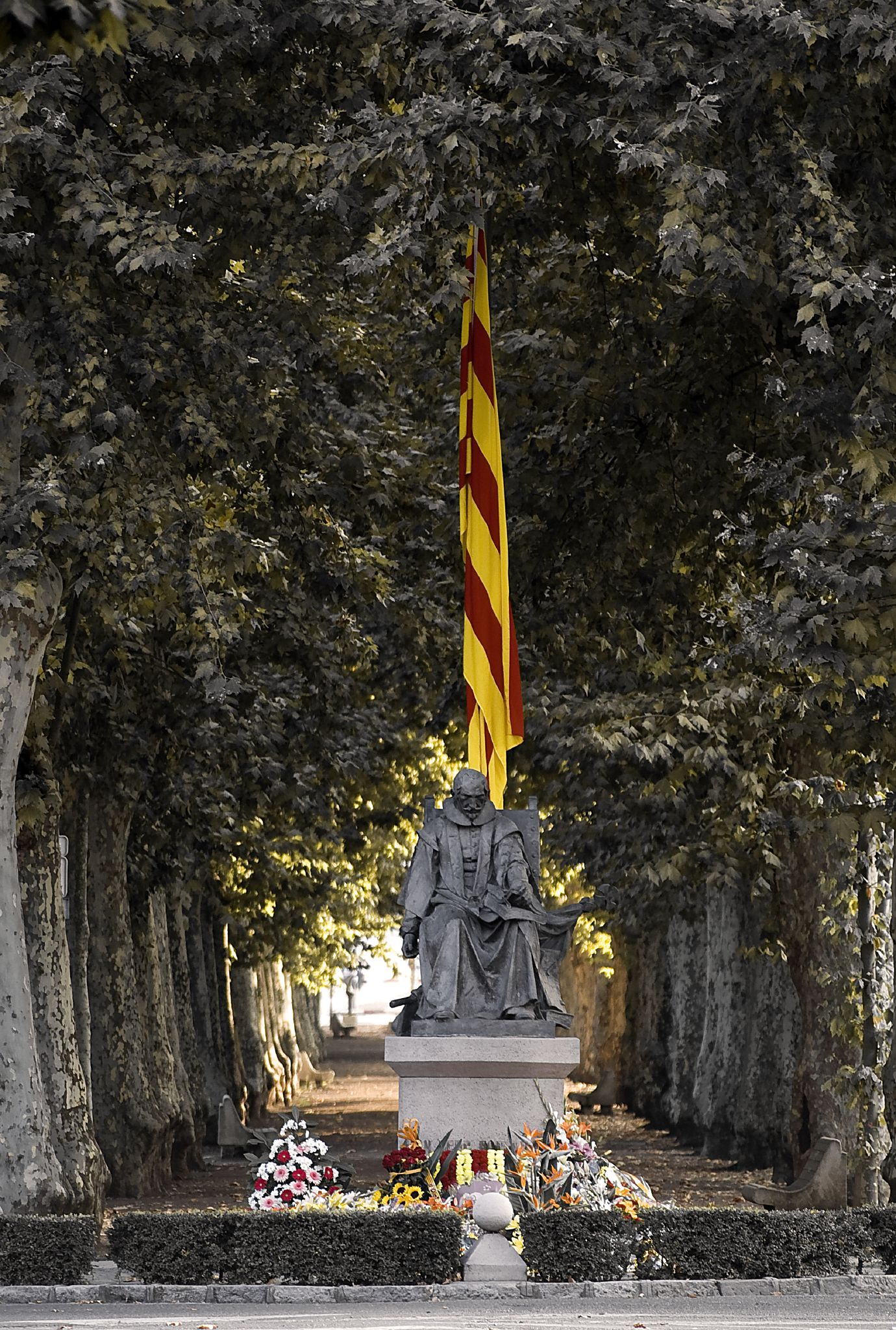
Monument dedicated to his father Joan Pere Fontanella (Olot, 1576-Olot, 1649), Conseller en Cap in the Reapers' War (Guerra dels Segadors), at the Barcelona street, Olot.

Francesc Fontanella (Catalan pronunciation: [fɾənˈsɛsk funtəˈneʎə]; 1622 – c. 1680/1685) was a Catalan poet, dramatist, and priest.

Fontanella was born in Barcelona. He studied law and was granted a degree in Civil and Canon law in 1641. Until 1652 he lived a courtesan life in Barcelona and began writing love poetry and wrote his two dramatic works: Tragicomèdia d'Amor, Firmesa i Porfia (1642) and Lo desengany (1651). Both pieces are allegorical with some pastoral elements. His poetry was more mature: he changed the pseudonym Gilet for the more pastoral Fontano and achieved great poetic heights in the sonnets dedicated to the death of his first wife.

In 1652, around the time of the defeat of the Catalan Revolt, he fled to Perpignan where he began a completely different life: the death of his second wife led to his entry in the Dominican order and he was ordained as a priest. His poetry thus changed from amorous themes to religious ones and from euphoria to pessimism, a contrast completely personal yet simultaneously typical of the baroque. He died in Perpignan.

He is considered to be one of the most important figures in the Catalan baroque along with Francesc Vicenç Garcia and Josep Romaguera.

== Notable works ==
- 1642: Tragicomèdia pastoral d'Amor, Firmesa i Porfia
- 1651: Lo desengany
