= Manel de la Rosa =

Catalan writer and educator

- Born: 1961 (age 64–65); Barcelona, Catalonia
- Writing career
- Language: Catalan
- Genre: Novel
- Notable work: Cada color d'un riu

Manel de la Rosa Mileo (Barcelona, 1961) is a writer and writing teacher at Ateneu Barcelonès, where he currently teaches narrative techniques and novel. He was chosen as New Talent FNAC of Catalan literature in 2012.

== Published work ==
- 2007: L'holandès (Castelló : Ellago) ISBN 9788496720381
- 2012: Cada color d'un riu (Barcelona : Edicions del Periscopi) ISBN 9788494049019
