= Jordi de Manuel =

Spanish writer

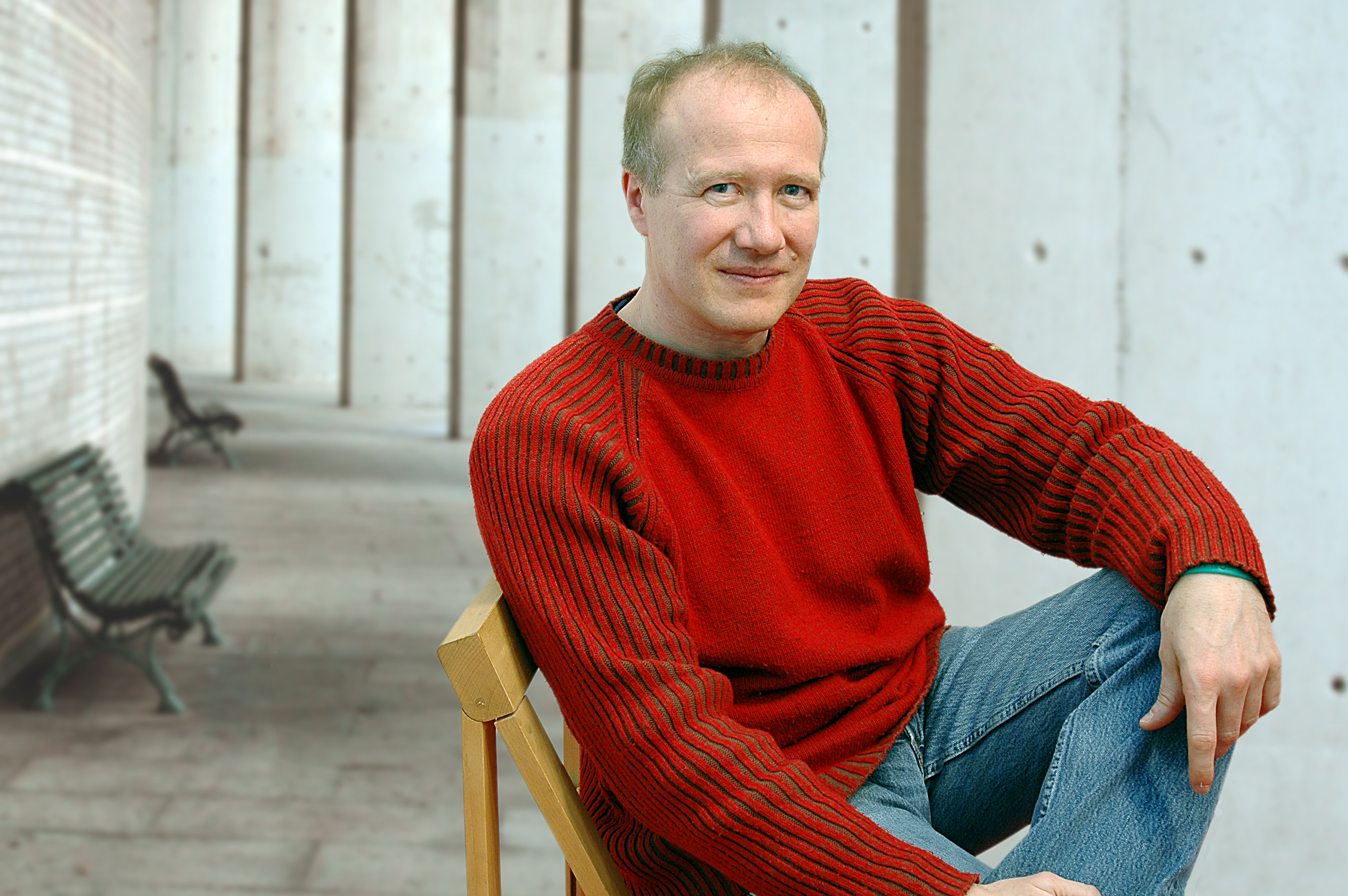
Jordi de Manuel

Jordi de Manuel i Barrabín (Barcelona, 1962) teaches Natural Sciences and is also a writer who combines literature with teaching and research. He is a member of the SCCFF (Catalan Society of Fantasy and Science Fiction).

He has published stories and novels for children and adolescents, among them, El pes de la por (The Weight of Fear, 1998, with Sílvia Vega), El somni de la nena bruna (The Brown Girl's Dream), which was awarded the City of Eivissa Prize for Children's Literature in 2000, De tots colors (Of All Colours, 2001), Els ulls d’Abdeslam (Abdeslam's Eyes, 2001), Set de llops (Seven Wolf Stories, 2003), and El beuratge (The Potion, 2003).

He has also written novels and stories for adults, including Tres somnis blaus (Three Blue Dreams), which received the 2000 Valldaura Prize, Cels taronges (Orange Skies) which was awarded the Ciutat de Mollerussa Prize in 2001, Cabells porpres (Purple Hair), winner of the 2002 Pere Calders Prize for Catalan Literature, Pantera negra (Black Panther), winner of the 2004 Sant Just Desvern Fiction Prize for Prose under the pseudonym Joan Gols, and Calcs (Borrowings), winner of the 2005 Manuel de Pedrolo Science Fiction Prize. His collection of stories entitled Disseccions (Dissections, 2001), was awarded the Odissea Readers’ Prize, the only literary award with a jury consisting of one hundred readers.

He has also published a number of research articles on biology, along with numerous papers on innovation and teaching in the Natural Sciences. He has participated in teams that have been awarded, for their contributions to Science teaching, the 1992 Barcanova Prize for Innovation in Teaching, the 1996 Enciclopèdia Catalana Prize for Research and Innovation in Teaching and the 1998 Eudald Maideu Prize. He is a member of AELC (Association of Catalan Language Writers).

== Published works ==
=== Tales and novels for to children and teenagers ===
- El somni de la nena bruna. Premi Ciutat d'Eivissa, Res Publica, 2000
- De tots colors. Alfaguara, 2001
- Set de llops. La Galera, 2003
- El pes de la por. Alfaguara, 1998
- Un niu de formigues. Animallibres, 2008
- El beuratge. Alfaguara, 2003
- Els ulls d'Abdelslam. La Galera, 2001 (also traduced to Spanish)
- Un niu de formigues. Animallibres, 2008
- El món fosc. Talps. Santillana/Jollibre, 2018

=== Novels and short narrative for adults ===
- Tres somnis blaus. Columna; premi Valldaura, 2000
- Cels taronges. Columna; premi Ciutat de Mollerussa, 2001
- Disseccions. Proa; premi El lector de L'Odissea, 2001
- Cabells propres. Columna; premi Pere Calders de Literatura Catalana, 2002
- L'olor de la pluja. La Magrana, 2006
- Calcs. Mataró. Ajuntament de Mataró, 2005
- El cant de les dunes. Pagès editors, 2006
- El raptor de gnoms. La Magrana, 2007
- Mans lliures. Edicions 62, 2009
- Orsai, Editorial Meteora, 2012
- La mort del corredor de fons. Edicions 62, 2012.
- La decisió de Manperel. Columna, 2013. Premi Pin i Soler de narrativa, 2013.
- Científics lletraferits(con Salvador Macip), Ed. Mètode, 2013.
- 100 situacions extraordinàries a l'aula. Ed. Cossetània, 2014.
- Foc verd. Ed. Alrevés. 2016
- Mans negres. Pagès Editors. 2017

=== Short stories in anthologies ===
- L'home que estripava llibres, a Un cop de Sort. Proa, 2003
- Dos anys de vacances, Al recull "Els fills del capità Verne". Lleida, Pagès editors, 2005
- El laberint, a Salou 6 pre-textos III. Barcelona, Meteora, 2007
- Segrest exprés, en Crims.cat, Alrevés, 2010.
- Nit del segon origen, en Tombes i lletres, Ed. Sidilla, 2010.
- Crònica breu d'un ésser estàtic, en Científics lletraferits, Ed. Mètode, 2013.
- Els hostes, en Contes de terror, Lleida. Apostroph, 2017.
- La trampa, en Viatge a la perifèria criminal, Barcelona, Alrevés, 2017
