= Vicent Sanz i Arnau =

Spanish educator and writer

Vicent Sanz i Arnau (born 31 March 1966 in Traiguera, Baix Maestrat) is a Spanish professor and writer who writes in the Catalan language.

== Biography ==
After graduating with a degree in Catalan Philology, Sanz has worked as a secondary school teacher and within the Catalan Language Teaching Service (SERC) of the Department of Education of the Generalitat of Catalonia. He has also collaborated with the Institute of Education Sciences at the University of Barcelona, the Permanent Board of Catalan (Junta Permanent de Català), and the Open University of Catalonia (UOC).

Throughout his career, he has published articles on historical topics in Traiguera, Caramella, Saó, and the Butlletí del Centre d'Estudis del Maestrat, and on philological and educational content in the journals Escola Catalana, Llengua nacional, Guix, BeCEroles, and Empelt.

== Awards ==
Sanz has been awarded several prizes for his unpublished short fiction works:

- Olives trencades i timó – VII "Alambor" Short Story Award of Benicarló (1996)
- Begudes refrescants – I Virtual Creation Award in the Narrative category, Open University of Catalonia (1999)
- El tren de la platja – XX Maresme Literary Exhibition Award (2003)

== Bibliography ==
=== Novels and Short Fiction ===
- Cròniques perdudes. Picanya: Edicions del Bullent, 1996. ISBN 8489663130
- Partida. El Perelló: Aeditors, 2008. ISBN 9788493574086
- La Font de la Salut. Barcelona: Edicions de Saldonar, 2011. ISBN 978-84-937800-5-0
- Màxima discreció. Barcelona: Edicions de Saldonar, 2015. ISBN 978-84-942896-2-0
- Estrella de mar. Benicarló: Onada Edicions, 2020. ISBN 978-84-18634-06-2
- Una força cega. Benicarló: Onada Edicions, 2025. ISBN 978-84-10259-41-6

=== Participation in Collective Works ===
- Estius a l'Ebre. El Perelló: Aeditors, 2007.
- Galeria ebrenca. El Perelló: Aeditors, 2009.
- Octavi Serret: de Vall-de-roures al món. Terres de l'Ebre: Editorial Petròpolis, 2009. ISBN 9788461372423
- La cuina de Traiguera. Benicarló: Onada Edicions, 2012. (Recipe collection)
- Un pont sobre el meridià (El Pont Cooperativa de Lletres anthology), 2012.
- Ponts suspensius (El Pont Cooperativa de Lletres anthology), 2013.
- Assassins de l'Ebre. Barcelona: Llibres del Delicte, 2019.
- Josep Igual i els dies. Terres de l'Ebre: Editorial Petròpolis, 2021.
