= Act for the Immaculate Conception of Mary =

Act for the Immaculate Conception of Mary (Catalan: Acte per a la Immaculada Conceptio de Maria) is the name of a dramatic play, in the Catalan language, likely performed in Bethlehem College in Barcelona on May 13, 1662, to celebrate a declaration of Pope Alexander VII in support of the idea of Immaculate Conception.

The work argues for the absence of original sin in the one who was to become the Mother of God.

The author of the allegorical play is unknown, and only a fragment of 732 verses has been preserved. These demonstrate the ambitious nature of the play, both in literary and theological terms.

== Sources ==
- Diccionari de la Literatura Catalana, 2008
