= Elisabet Abeyà =

Spanish teacher and psychologist

- Born: Elisabet Abeyà Lafontana; 20 May 1951 (age 75)
- Writing career
- Language: Catalan

Elisabet Abeyà Lafontana (born 20 May 1951) is a teacher, psychologist and Catalan novelist.

Abeyà was born in Barcelona. She has translated from English into Catalan three works by the orientalist Joan Mascaró Fornés. Like Joan Mascaró, she is a sympathizer of the international Esperanto language. Her works have been translated into Asturian, Breton, Castilian, Basque, French, Galician, Dutch and Swedish.

== Work ==
Children's Literature

- Ansa per ansa: material de lectura i escriptura (1979)
- La bruixa que va perdre la granera (1985)
- ¿Qué seré cuando sea mayor?, La Galera 1989 (Què seré quan sigui gran? 1987)
- El nanet coloraina i més sorpreses (1987)
- Querido abuelo, La Galera, 1990 (Estimat avi, 1990)
- La bruja que iba en bicicleta, La Galera 1991 (La bruixa que anava amb bicicleta, 1991)
- Siete hermanos músicos, La Galera 2002 (Set Germans músics, 1991)
- Regal d'aniversari (1992)
- M'agrada jugar (1993)
- María, la quejica, La Galera 1997 (Rondina que rondinaràs, 1997)
- I un punt més: contes per tornas a contar, Moll, 2004
- El tren que anava a la mar (2005)

Child psychology

- Emociones, Rosa Sensat, 2005 (Emocions, 2002)
- M'expliques un conte? (2010, Rosa Sensat)

Translations into Catalan

- La no-violència en la pau i en la guerra de M. K. Gandhi (Ahimsa, 1983)
- L'accident (Collision course) by Nigel Hinton (La Galera, 1987)
- Mister Majeika de Humphrey Carpenter (Pirene, 1987)
- Bhagavad Gita (Moll 1988)
- Carles, Emma i Alberic de Margaret Greaves (La Galera, 1988)
- Les fantàstiques proeses del doctor Boox (The fantastic feats of Doctor Boox) de Andrew Davies (La Galera, 1989)
