= Renaixença =

19th-century Catalan revivalist movement

The Renaixença (Catalan pronunciation: [rənəˈʃɛnsə]; also written Renaixensa before spelling standardisation), or Catalan Renaissance, was a Romantic revivalist movement in Catalan language and culture through the mid 19th century, akin to the Galician Rexurdimento or the Occitan Félibrige movements. The movement began in the 1830s and lasted until the 1880s, when it branched out into other cultural movements. Even though it primarily followed a romantic impulse, it incorporated stylistic and philosophical elements of other 19th-century movements such as Naturalism or Symbolism. The name does not indicate a particular style, but rather the cultural circumstances in which it bloomed.

== Overview ==
Along with the later modernisme, this movement ended a period of Catalan cultural decline commonly known as Decadència, that dated back at least to defeat in the War of the Spanish Succession (1701–1714) and the subsequent Nueva Planta decrees, which suppressed Catalonia's traditional institutions, privileges, and furs beginning January 16, 1716. Thus, the aim of this movement was the full restoration of Catalan as a language of culture, not only through the promotion of various forms of art, theatre and literature in this language, but also attempting to establish a normative standard for the language, something however not fully accomplished until the first quarter of the 20th century.

As with most of the other Romantic movements, it was noted for its admiration of the Middle Ages, which was often reflected in art, and in Barcelona, the literary contest known as Jocs Florals or Jocs de la Gaia Ciència was revived.

The Renaixença occurred not only in Catalonia proper, but also in other Catalan-speaking regions such as the Balearic Islands and Valencia.

A journal particularly associated with the movement was the magazine La Renaixença - originally spelt Renaixensa before the Fabrian spelling reform. The existence of this journal and its homonymous publishing company helped to consolidate the term "Renaixença" as the name of the movement by the end of the 19th century. Other names commonly used in the mid-19th century include "despertament" or "desvetllament" ("awakening"), "renaixement" ("rebirth"; the term is a doublet of "renaixença", although it is liable to confusion with the Renaissance period), "resurrecció" ("resurrection") and "revifalla" or "reviscolança" ("revival").

== Notable individuals related to Renaixença ==
- Bonaventura Carles Aribau, writer. His poem Oda a la pàtria is usually acknowledged to have kick-started the movement.
- Manuel Milà i Fontanals, linguist, philologist and troubadour literature scholar, of great influence and one of the main initiators of the Renaixença.
- Joan Maragall, poet, translator from Greek and German, journalist and essayist.
- Jacint Verdarguer, poet, penned L'Atlàntida and the Catalan national epic, Canigó.
- Àngel Guimerà, playwright.
- Narcís Oller, novelist influenced by Émile Zola's naturalism, chronicled the Industrial Revolution, society and changing mindsets in his novels.
- Frederic Soler, known as Pitarra, playwright using colloquial Catalan.
- Joaquim Rubió i Ors, poet, known variously as Lo Gayté del Llobregat, El Gaiter del Llobregat, among others
- Víctor Català (real name Caterina Albert i Paradís), symbolist writer.
- Martí Genís i Aguilar, writer.
- Antoni Puig i Blanch, poet.
- Francesc Camprodon, poet.
- Víctor Balaguer, writer. Used the pseudonym Lo trovador de Montserrat.
- Antoni Gaudí, architect. Greatest exponent of Catalan Modernism.
- Maria Antònia Salvà i Ripoll, poet.
