= Joan Alcover =

Spanish author

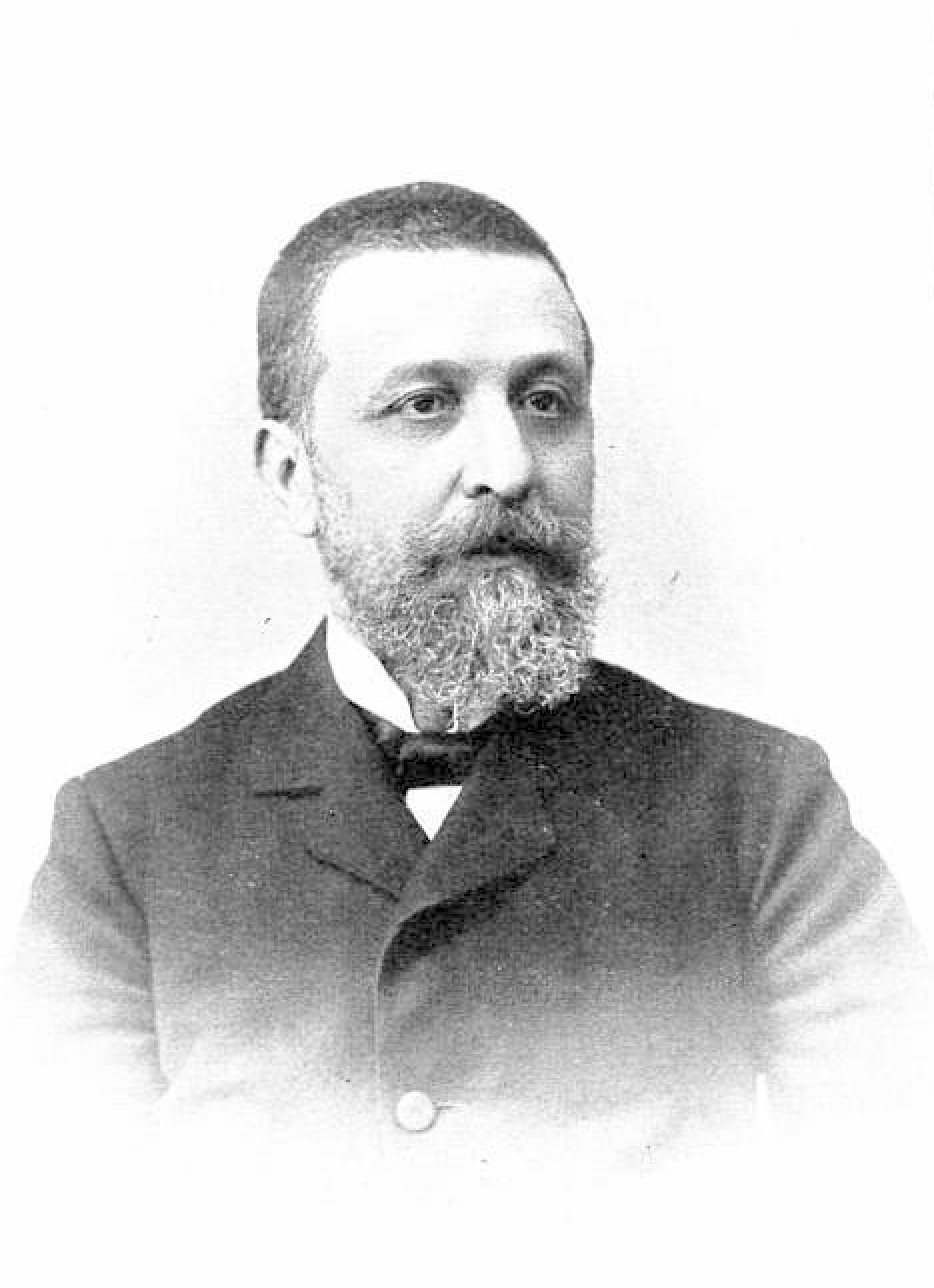
- Alcover in a 1905 publication
- Born: Joan Alcover i Maspons; 3 May 1854; Palma de Mallorca, Spain
- Died: 25 February 1926 (aged 71); Palma de Mallorca, Spain
- Occupations: Lawyer, politician, poet
- Spouse(s): Rosa Pujol Guarch; Maria del Haro Rosselló
- Children: Pere, Teresa, Gaietà; Maria, Pau
- Writing career
- Language: Catalan and Spanish
- Notable work: La Balanguera (Mallorca Hymn)
- Notable awards: Floral Games

Joan Alcover i Maspons (Catalan pronunciation: [ʒuˈan əlkuˈve]; 1854 – 1926) was a Spanish Balearic writer, poet, essayist and politician.

== Biography ==
The son of an influential family, he studied the Baccalaureate at the Balearic Institute before reading for a degree in Law in Barcelona. Once he became a lawyer in 1878, he returned to Majorca to take up varying posts in the Island's judiciary. Simultaneously, he was a militant of the liberal party of his friend Antoni Maura when he commenced a political career that would culminate in his appointment as a representative of the 'Corts' [Courts] (1893). After a short stay in Madrid, he returned home to the Balearic Islands and abandoned all political activities.

From an early age, he had combined his studies and later on, his professional occupation, with his interest in writing. At the age of eighteen, he had published his poems in both Catalan and Spanish in magazines like 'El Isleño', 'Museo Balear', or 'Revista Balear'. However, his literary interest would become stronger during the time spent in Barcelona, where he came into contact with the literary activities of the 'Renaixença' cultural movement (magazines, literary contests, conferences, readings...). At 23 he would win an extraordinary prize at the Barcelona Floral Games.

Joan Alcover was to gain recognition as a poet, and he would soon become the kind of person who, extremely fond of literature, would use his literary ability in order to gain social prestige. Thus, his house soon became the base for reputed talks with the prestigious Majorcan intellectuals. Little by little, he ceased to write in Catalan, preferring to write his poetry in Spanish. His first poetry books 'Poesías' [Poetries] (1887), 'Nuevas poesías' [New poetries] (1892), 'Poemas y armonías' [Poetries and harmonies] (1894), and 'Meteoros. Poemas, apólogos y cuentos' [Meteors. Poems, apologues and stories] (1901), reflect this tendency to be monolingual, even though he would include some poems in Catalan in the first two titles. However, the other two titles would be entirely written in Spanish. This is poetry inspired by the Romantic, which imitates other poets', such as Bécquer and Campoamor, having intense expression of the poetical voice, yet straining to avoid rhetorical excesses and pomposity. His books were well received by critics who provided him a title in circles that supported the official culture.

However, misfortune played a decisive role in both his life and literary career. In 1887, just six years after he had wed, Alcover lost his wife, Rosa Pujol Guarch, with whom he had had three children, Pere, Teresa and Gaietà. In 1891 he married Maria del Haro Rosselló, with whom he had two more children, Maria and Pau. Of the five children, he would only be outlived by the last one: in 1901 Teresa died from tuberculosis; in 1905, Pere died from typhoid; in 1919 both Maria and Gaietà perished on the same day. This sequence of misfortunes drove him to a deep nervous breakdown, which would lead him to heighten his intellectual research, deriving of more natural and sincere forms of expression. His poetry would progressively start to change, beginning with its medium, that is the language in which it was written. Between 1899 and 1903, Alcover would hesitate whether to continue writing in Spanish or return to Catalan: he would eventually decide to fully embrace Catalan.

In fact, his personal circumstances would overlap with other collective conditions: in the Majorca of the time, Romantic literature was in decline, the island was becoming modernized, cultural ties had started to emerge with Catalonia and political Catalanism was starting to gain prominence in the island. All this moved him to broaden his literary horizons, to join a wider movement and to make ties, mainly due to his friendship with Santiago Rusiñol and Josep Carner, with the Principalities’ cultural activity. This move guided him towards a new perception of art and literature, whose sense was no longer ingeniousness and the entertaining easy game, but a social involvement: he believed that poetry must have a resonance and that it must serve a useful purpose in the collective from which it drew its inspiration and whom it served.

In 1904, he gave a seminar at Barcelona's Athenaeum entitled ‘Humanització de l’art’ [Humanising of art], which constituted his most important declaration about the art of lyrical composition. In this text, he defended the belief that a poet's involvement should be aesthetically exposed in clear and intelligible poetry, in a well-presented form. However, he expressed his dislike for an intellectualized poetry and those so-called literary schools and trends that were based upon mere artifice. Therefore, he positioned himself halfway between a spontaneous type of poetry, like that written by Joan Maragall, and a lyricism constructed upon perfect form, but sentimentally arid, like that written by the Parnassian poets. In accordance with the turn of the centuries' views about truth and life, Alcover would pursue a poetry style tied to life's experience which was able to deeply connect with the reader's sense of humanity.

The book that best exemplifies his lyrical theory is 'Cap al tard' [When it is getting late] (1909), which was written entirely in Catalan. In this collection of unrelated poems, we see a lyrical voice split into different people, describing many landscapes which are typically Majorcan, in order to express their anemic state, feelings and emotions, as well as the poet's own artistic conception. Alcover did this by using forms and ideas taken from popular imaginary, like those we find in the poem ‘Balanguera’, which would be adapted to music by Amadeu Vives and become Majorca's present-day hymn. The section entitled ‘Elegies’ [Elegies] is, without doubt, one of the high points of the book: here the poet demonstrates, from a slightly detached angle, the fatherly suffering he had experienced, even though, it must be said, he transcends this pain by turning it into an emotion that can be universally felt. In ‘Poemes bíblics’ [Biblical poems] (1918), which would be his final book of poems, he again uses different poetical persons, but this time, they are of biblical inspiration, and he does not achieve the same degree of excellence that he had reached in the previous volume.

His status as an intellectual, like that of Miquel Costa i Llobera, was recognized and acclaimed by many writers of the time, and especially by those of the 'escola mallorquina' [Majorcan School]. He was a member of the 'Acadèmia de Bones Lletres' [Academy of Good Letters] (1913), President of the Barcelona 'Jocs Florals' [Floral Games] (1916), and a member of the 'Institut d'Estudis Catalans' [Institute of Catalan Studies] (1916).
