= Mirèio =

1859 poem in Occitan by Frédéric Mistral

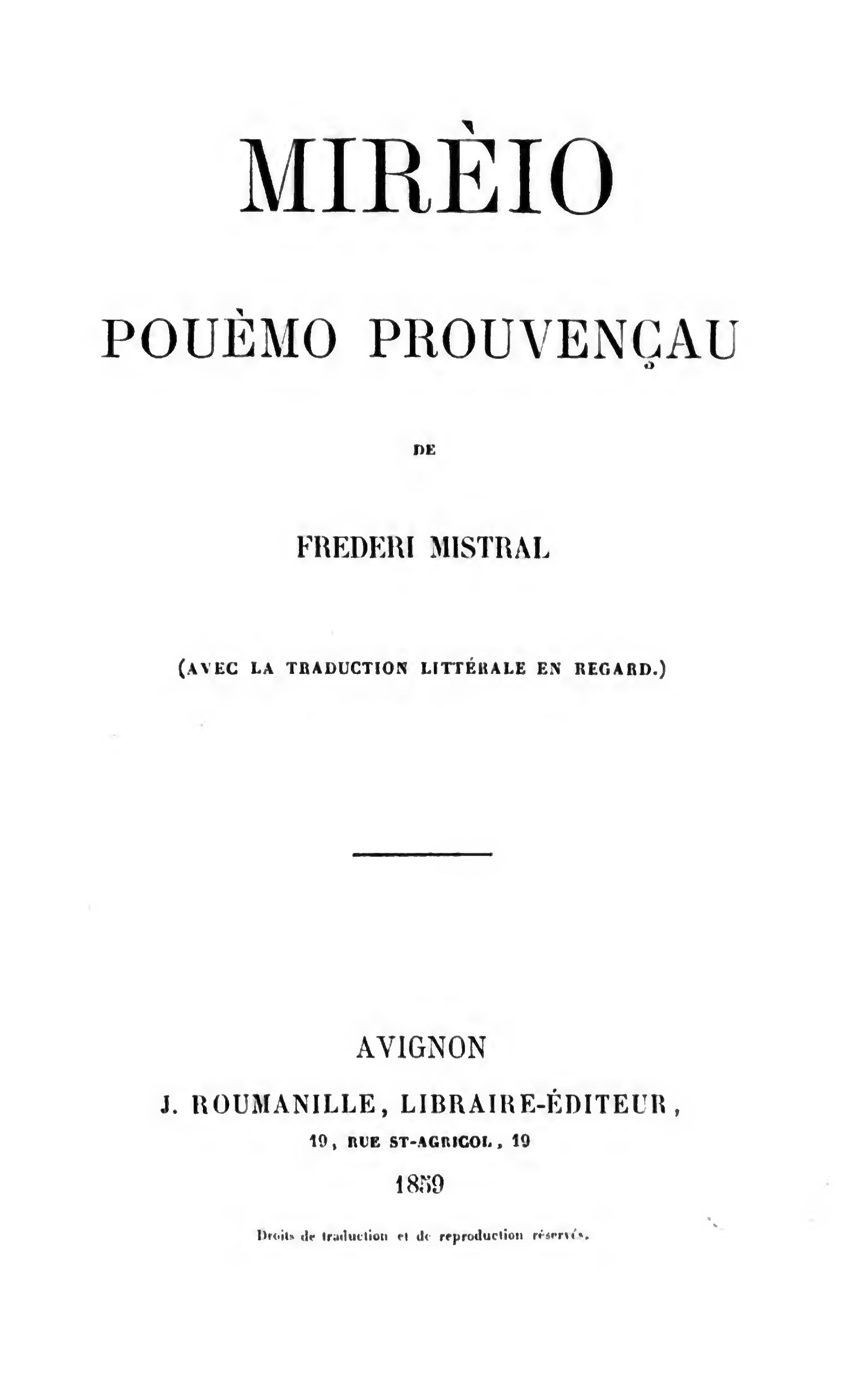
Mirèio

Mirèio (in Mistralian norm, pronounced [miˈrɛjɔ]; Mirèlha in classical norm, pronounced [miˈrɛjɔ, mi'rɛʎɔ]) is a poem in Occitan (Provençal) by French writer Frédéric Mistral, written in 1859 after eight years of effort. Mirèio, a long poem consisting of twelve songs, tells of the thwarted love of Vincent and Mireille, two young Provençal people of different social backgrounds. The name Mireille/Mirèio was coined by Mistral as a doublet of the word meraviho 'wonder'. Mirèio was the first great success of Frédéric Mistral.

== Overview ==
Mistral used the poem to promote the Occitan language, the lingua franca of Southern France until the vergonha, as well as to share the culture of Provence. He tells, among other tales, of Saintes-Maries-de-la-Mer, where according to legend the dragon Tarasque was driven out, and of the famous and ancient Venus of Arles. He prefaced the poem with a short notice about Provençal pronunciation. Mirèio was translated into some fifteen European languages, including into French by Mistral himself. In 1863, Charles Gounod made it into an opera, Mireille.

== The plot ==
In Provence, Mireille (Mirèio) is the daughter of a rich farmer. She is in love with a modest basketmaker, Vincent (Vincènt). Her father disapproves of the relationship and seeks other suitors. Mireille, in despair, escapes from her house to Saintes-Maries-de-la-Mer. There, she prays to the saints that her father will accept her relationship with Vincent. The way is hard and unbearably hot. At the end, the saints appear to Mireille. They tell her of their happiness in Paradise, and Mireille dies in peace.

== Dedication ==
Mistral dedicated his book to Alphonse de Lamartine, a French writer, poet and politician who was instrumental in the foundation of the Second Republic and the continuation of the Tricolore as the flag of France, as follows:

"To Lamartine:

To you, I dedicate Mirèio: It is my heart and my soul; It is the flower of my years; It is bunch of grapes from La Crau, leaves and all, a peasant's offering."

Lamartine wrote enthusiastically: "I will tell you good news today! A great epic poet is born ... A true Homeric poet in our time; ... Yes, your epic poem is a masterpiece; ... the perfume of your book will not evaporate in a thousand years." This praise contributed to the great success of the poem.
