= Josep Romaguera =

Josep Romaguera (Catalan pronunciation: [ʒuˈzɛb ruməˈɣeɾə]; 1642–1723) is the author of the only emblem book ever published in the Catalan language, the Atheneo de Grandesa. His work consists of prose, poetry and sermons. His writing is typical of Baroque style.

Romaguera was born in Barcelona during the Catalan Revolt (Guerra dels Segadors) against Castile in 1642 and lived until 1723, according to the epitaph of him published in the manuscript Historia Eclesiástica del principado de Cataluña by the Mercedarian historian Pere Serra i Postius. There is no known mention of him in public life until he began his ecclesiastical career in 1661, the date of his first benefice; he served both in the Inquisition and as a Canon Law Professor at the University of Barcelona. Romaguera’s publications, apart from the Atheneo, include sermons preached in Castilian on various Saints’ festival days; his other works, including apparently the second and/or third volumes of the Atheneo, are lost. According to the epitaph by Postius, Romaguera was a renowned preacher and intellectual, and also represented the Catholic Church in the Courts convened by Philip V in 1701–1702. For Postius, Romaguera was a unique individual, "One of the most famous men that Catalonia has had in Letters, Prudence and Government at the end of the previous Century and beginning of the present one. For he was a very elegant orator in Verse as well as Prose. He was an ingenious, sententious, sweet, gallant and brilliant Catalan poet, as his book shows" [translation of Spanish original] (f.104r).

Romaguera was known as a defender of the Catalan language, and indeed in the Prologue to the Atheneo he states that his book is an attempt to give "an inspiration to Catalan pens."
