= Francesc Vicent Garcia =

Catalan poet (1579–1623)

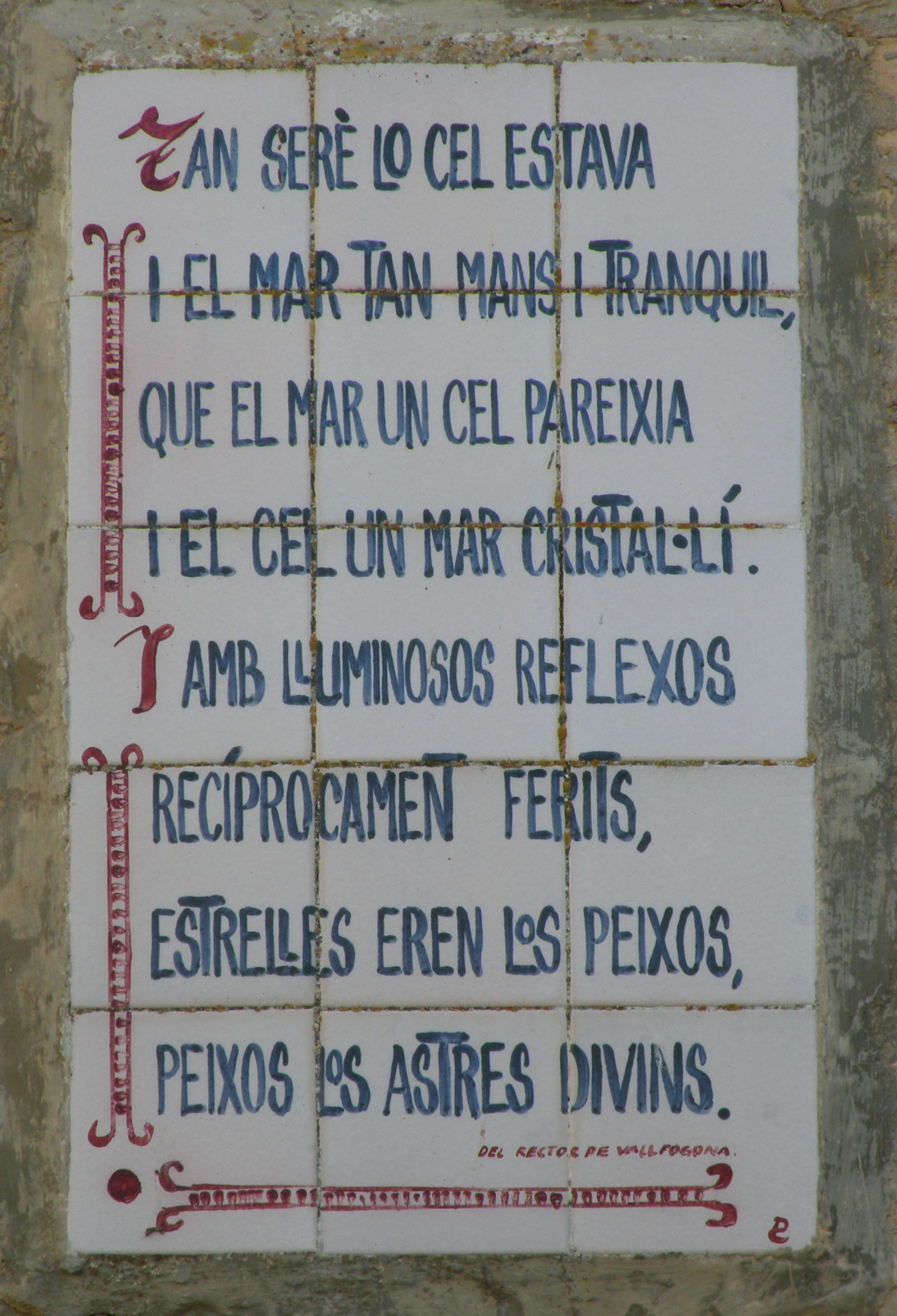
Poem of the Vallfogona Rector in a street in Vallfogona de Riucorb

Francesc Vicent Garcia (Catalan pronunciation: [fɾənˈsɛzɡ biˈsɛŋ ɡəɾˈsi.ə]; (1579–1623)) i Ferrandis was an early modern Catalan poet known by the pseudonym of the Vallfogona Rector. He was born in Zaragoza in 1579 and died in Vallfogona de Riucorb (Conca de Barberà) in 1623. In 1605 he was ordained in Vic.

== Early life ==
Vicent Garcia completed his religious studies in Barcelona. In Vic, where he was ordained, he was the secretary to Bishop Francis Robust. In 1607, Garcia was appointed to the Vallfogona Riucorb rectory, where he remained until 1621. This spell at Vallfogona was followed by appointment to the post of secretary of the Bishop of Girona, Peter Moncada. A year after taking up this post, Garcia obtained a doctorate in theology from the College of St. George and St. Matthias in Tortosa. Vallfogona Riucorb died on September 2, 1623. Barcelona was a central place in Garcia's life. It was a city he visited frequently. In Barcelona, Garcia moved in the literary circle that met Bishop Juan de Moncada in his palace.

== Legacy ==
He cultivated an artful and elegant verse in sonnets and décima form, and also wrote violent satire and obscene or grotesque compositions. His style was imitated by many Catalan authors of the 18th century, a phenomenon known as "vallfogonisme." In 1703 a portion of his work was published. The 1770 edition was banned by the Inquisition. In 1988 Albert Rossich included some of his poems in an anthology of erotic and pornographic Catalan poetry from the 17th century.

== Rumors ==
Vicent Garcia was subject to numerous rumors. One of them was that he visited Madrid in 1622 at the request of King Philip IV. Another baseless belief was that he had a friendship with Lope de Vega. Perhaps the most absurd was the story of his alleged poisoning by Zaragoza courtiers. His literary stature, however, was unquestionable. He is widely accepted as the first great Catalan writer. His works were seminal, creating a literary school that lasted well into the nineteenth century.

== Style ==
Garcia's poetry resembled that of Spanish contemporary poets, especially in terms of the formality and theme. His use of language was particularly unique. He had a predilection for an elegant form of language, and his writings were always laced with irony and literary subjects. It was this characteristic in his work that drew comparisons with Quevedo. Some of Garcia best-known poems are A Lady in A beautiful Black Hair, Epitaph On the Grave Of a Heavy Drinker, and the sonnet Time. As the titles suggest, Garcia was a versatile poet, writing on diverse topics. He was also a playwright. He wrote a play, Comedy in Santa Barbara, to mark the occasion of the inauguration of the chapel of Santa Barbara Vallfogona in 1617.

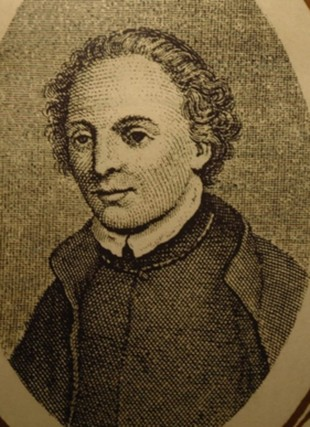
Francesc Vicent Garcia i Ferrandis

Cover of Francesc Vicent Garcia i Ferrandis's book

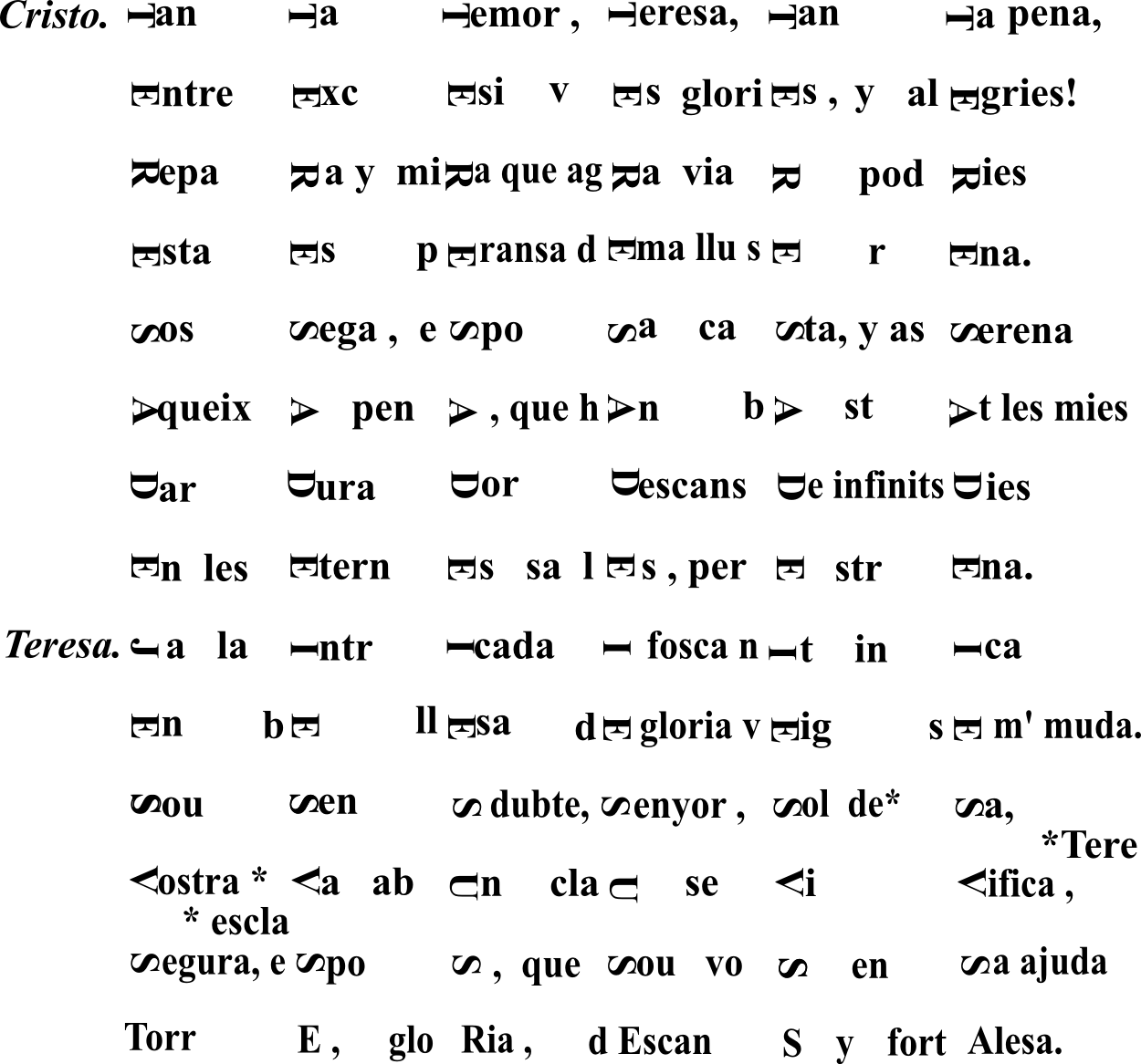
A sonnet by Francesc Vicent Garcia
