= Nuño González de Lara (died 1296) =

Lord consort of Alegrete, Vide and Sintra

Arms of the House of Lara.

Nuño González III de Lara (died 1296) was a Castilian noble of the House of Lara. He was the lord consort of Alegrete, Vide, and Sintra and served as Alférez del rey for King Ferdinand IV of Castile.

== Family origins ==
He was the son of Juan Núñez I de Lara the Fat, head of the House of Lara, and his wife, Teresa Díaz II de Haro, Lady of Biscay. His paternal grandparents were Nuño González de Lara el Bueno, Head of the House of Lara, and his wife, Teresa Alfonso. His maternal grandparents were Diego López III de Haro, Lord of Biscay and his wife, Constanza de Bearne. He was the great-great-grandson of Alfonso IX of León on both his mother's side and his father's side.

He was the brother of Juan Núñez II de Lara, head of the House of Lara, of Teresa Núñez de Lara y Haro, and of Juana Núñez de Lara, who married Ferdinand de la Cerda, Lord of Lara (1275–1322), son of the infante Ferdinand de la Cerda and grandson of Alfonso X of Castile.

== Biography ==
His exact date of birth is unknown. On 29 October 1288, he was confirmed together with his father and brother to the privileges granted by Sancho IV of Castile to the monastery of San Salvador de Pinilla de Molina. In August 1290, he accompanied his father to Valencia where he was working. His father signed an agreement during this period with King Alfonso III of Aragon wherein the two proposed to wage war against the Kingdom of Castile and to aid the Aragonese monarch in his war against Castile. Nevertheless, later in the same year, he returned with his father to Castile where King Sancho IV gave Nuño González a set of inheritances throughout the kingdom in exchange for an oath of loyalty from the young Lara.

During the Summer of 1293, whilst Nuño González and his brother, Juan Núñez II de Lara accompanied King Sancho IV to a meeting held in the city of Logroño with James II of Aragon, their father was captured by the infante John of Castile, brother of King Sancho IV. The capture was the result of Nuño González I de Lara having been defeated by infante John in a battle that took place in the area around Zamorano de Peleas. After receiving the notification, the brothers left the king and gathered a group of soldiers to try and liberate their father. Nuño González I was liberated by the infante John however upon promising him help in his fight against Diego López V de Haro to recover the Lordship of Biscay for his wife, María I Díaz de Haro, who had previously been the rightful title holder. Further, Nuño González I proposed that Denis of Portugal should join them in their fight.

In 1294, Sancho IV sent Juan Núñez I to Andalucía to defend the frontier against the attacks of Muhammad II of Granada, who had at the time allied himself with the Sultan of Morocco, Yusuf II. Nuño González accompanied his father during the expedition. His father died in the city of Córdoba. Afterwards, Nuño González returned to Castile together with the entourage that accompanied his fathers cadaver and assisted in sepulchering him in the Convento de San Pablo de Burgos of the Dominican Order.

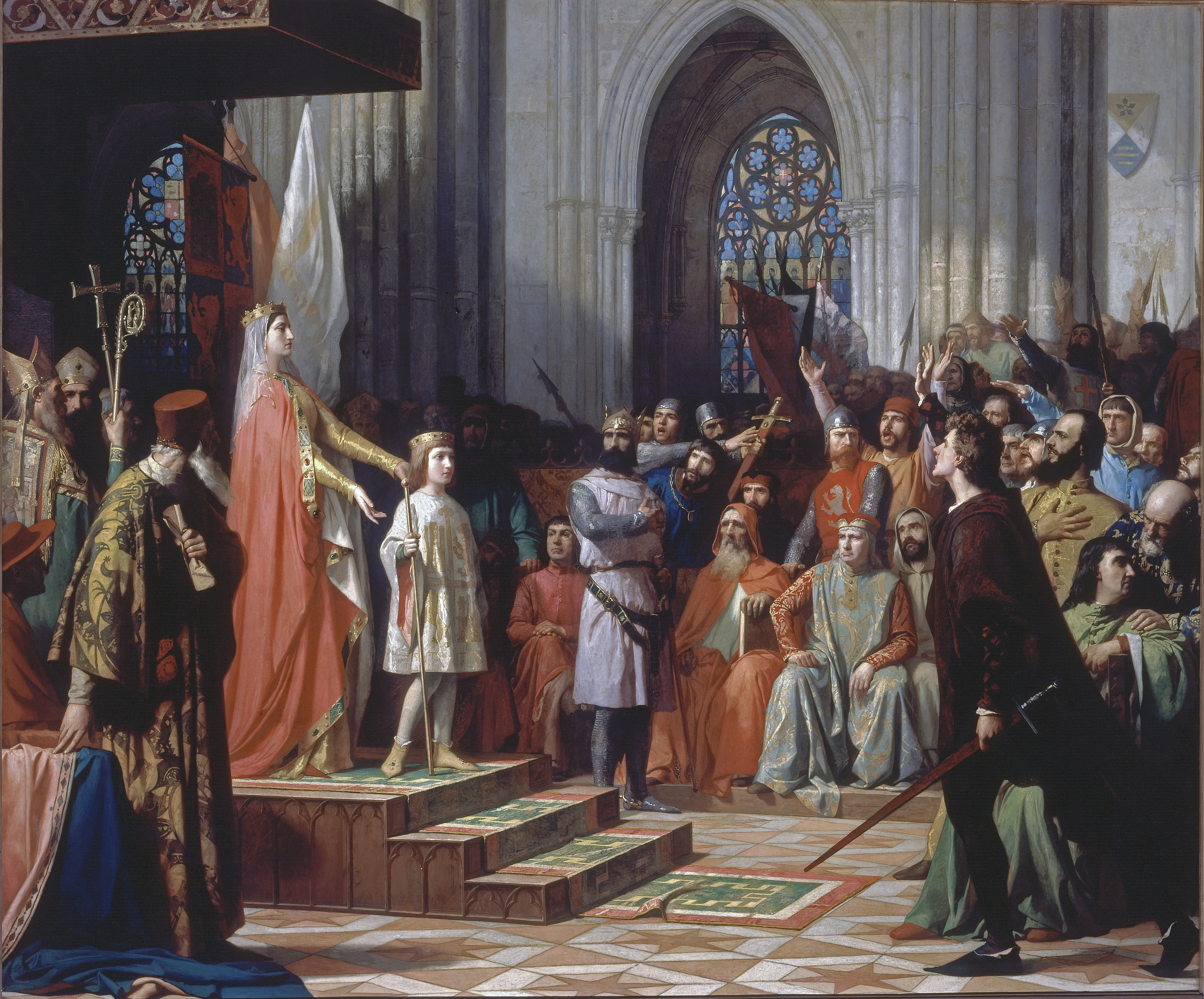
María de Molina her son, Fernando IV to the Cortes de Valladolid of 1295. Painted by Antonio Gisbert Pérez. 1863. Congreso de los Diputados.

In April 1295, King Sancho IV of Castile el Bravo, died in the city of Toledo. He was accompanied during this time by various contemporary magnates including his wife the queen, María de Molina, the Infante Henry of Castile, and by Nuño González himself who had after the death of his father, become a very powerful landed noble.

After the death of Sancho IV, the tutorship of Ferdinand IV of Castile who was a young child at the time, passed to the hands of the infante Henry who was the only living child of the Ferdinand III of Castile the Saint. Nevertheless, custody and care of the child was usurped by his mother, Maria de Molina who sought the backing of Juan Núñez II de Lara and Nuño González to aid John of Castile in his efforts against both the influence of the infante Henry, and the ongoing fight for control over Biscay against Diego López V de Haro. The latter two would form an alliance against the Laras, John of Castile, Maria de Molina, and later Ferdinand IV himself.

In 1296, Nuño González's brother, Juan Núñez II, the infante John, Alfonso de la Cerda and the kings of Aragon and Portugal together attacked the Kingdom of Castile. Alfonso de la Cerda, the grandson of Alfonso X of Castile was named King of Castile in the area of Sahagún and the infante John was crowned King of Leon, Galicia and Seville at León. Nevertheless, Nuño González remained loyal to King Ferdinand II throughout along with the infante Henry and Diego López V de Haro.

== Death ==
Nuño González II de Lara died in 1296 in the city of Valladolid when he attempted a combat, by order of the Queen María de Molina, against certain enemies of Fernando IV.

== Marriage ==
Nuño González de Lara married around the year 1295 with Constanza de Portugal y Manuel, daughter of the infante Alfonso de Portugal, granddaughter of Afonso III of Portugal, and Violante Manuel, daughter of the infante Manuel of Castile and granddaughter of Ferdinand III of Castile.

His wife was the lady of Alegrete, Vide, and Sintra and the couple never had any descendants.

| Preceded by Alfonso Téllez de Molina | Alférez del rey 1295–1296 | Succeeded by Diego López V de Haro |
