= Álvaro Núñez de Lara (died 1287) =

Castilian nobleman

Arms of the House of Lara.

Álvaro Núñez de Lara (c. 1261 – 1287) was a Castilian nobleman, the son of Juan Núñez I de Lara, head of the House of Lara, and his first wife, Teresa Álvarez de Azagra.

== Family origins ==
He was the son of Juan Núñez I de Lara, head of the House of Lara, and his first wife, Teresa Álvarez de Azagra, Lady of Albarracín. His paternal grandparents were Nuño González de Lara "el Bueno", head of the House of Lara, and his wife Teresa Alfonso; his maternal grandparents were Álvaro Pérez de Azagra, Lord of Albarracín, and his wife, Inés, illegitimate daughter of King Theobald I of Navarre. His half-brothers, born to his father's second wife, were Juan Núñez II de Lara, head of the House of Lara; Nuño González de Lara; Teresa Núñez de Lara y Haro, and Juana Núñez de Lara.

== Biography ==
His exact date of birth is unknown, although it must have been around the year 1261. Genealogist Luis de Salazar y Castro asserted in his writings, presenting evidence thereof, that Álvaro Núñez de Lara was not the son of Juan Núñez I, but of his brother. Nonetheless, this assertion has been refuted by several modern historians based on the records of the time.

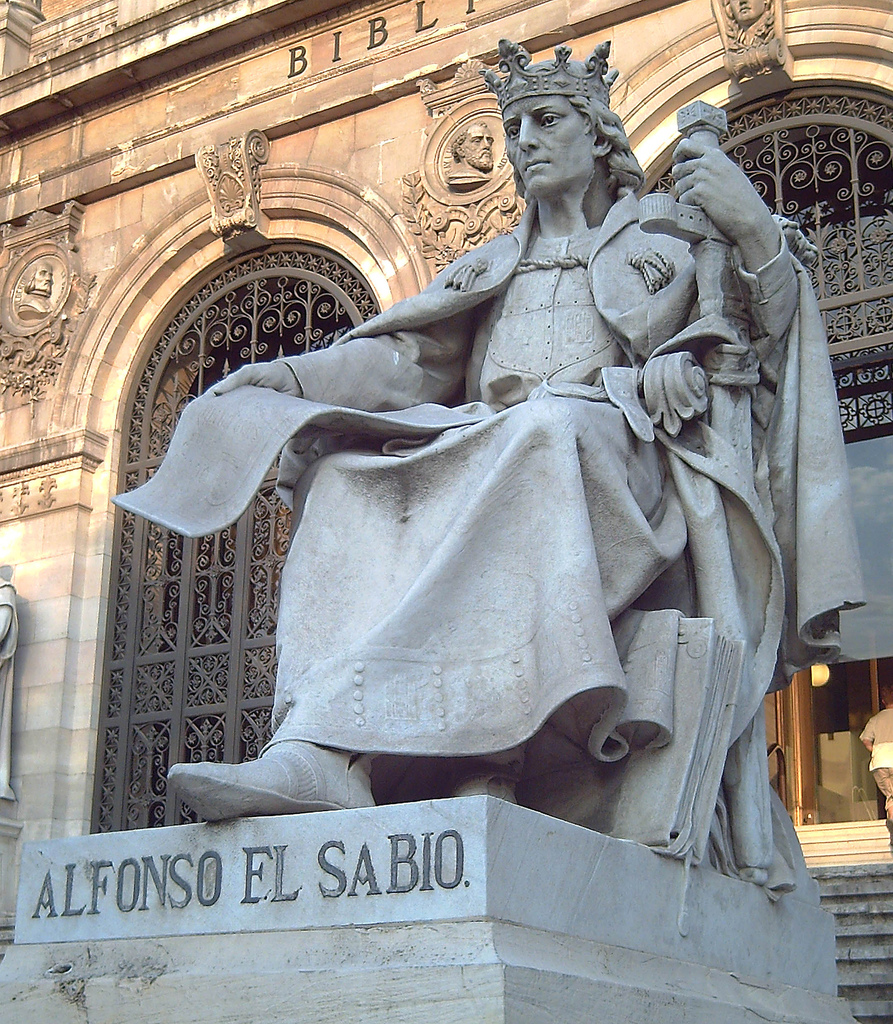
Statue of King Alfonso X of Castile. Biblioteca Nacional de España, Madrid.

In 1282 Álvaro Núñez de Lara supported Infante Sancho, who had revolted against his father, King Alfonso X of Castile, in dispute of his father's naming Alfonso de la Cerda heir to the throne. Álvaro joined infante Sancho when the latter set out from Córdoba to put down the revolt of the city of Badajoz, which had earlier supported infante Sancho. He then accompanied Sancho again in defense of Córdoba, which was being besieged by King Alfonso and Sultan Abu Yusuf Yaqub of Morocco. The two monarchs were forced to lift the siege, and Alfonso continued on to Seville.

In 1283 Álvaro Núñez de Lara abandoned infante Sancho and defected to the side of his father King Alfonso. Joining him were Nuño Fernández de Valdenebro; Juan Fernández "Cabellos de Oro", grandson of King Alfonso IX of León; and other nobles. They made their way through Portugal so as not to be intercepted, and continued on to Seville where Alfonso was holding court.

After his arrival in Seville, the King ordered him and his men to join the expedition to be led by infante John of Castile "el de Tarifa" and Fernán Pérez Ponce de León I, adelantado mayor of Andalusia, whose goal was to take Mérida, which was then in the hands of infante Sancho's partisans. Álvaro Núñez de Lara was joined on this mission by Juan Fernández "Cabellos de Oro", Nuño Fernández de Valdenebro, Pedro Páez de Asturias, and Fernán Fernández de Limia. The expedition was a success and Alfonso's forces swiftly occupied Mérida.

In April 1284, King Alfonso X died in Seville and was succeeded on the throne by his elder son, infante Sancho, as Sancho IV. After Alfonso's death, Álvaro Núñez de Lara formed part of the group of Castilian and Leonese nobles and magnates who prevented infante John "el de Tarifa", the new king's brother, from taking control of Seville. Later he witnessed the entry of Sancho IV into Córdoba and Seville, and was present at the confirmation by King Sancho of the privileges of the city of Seville.

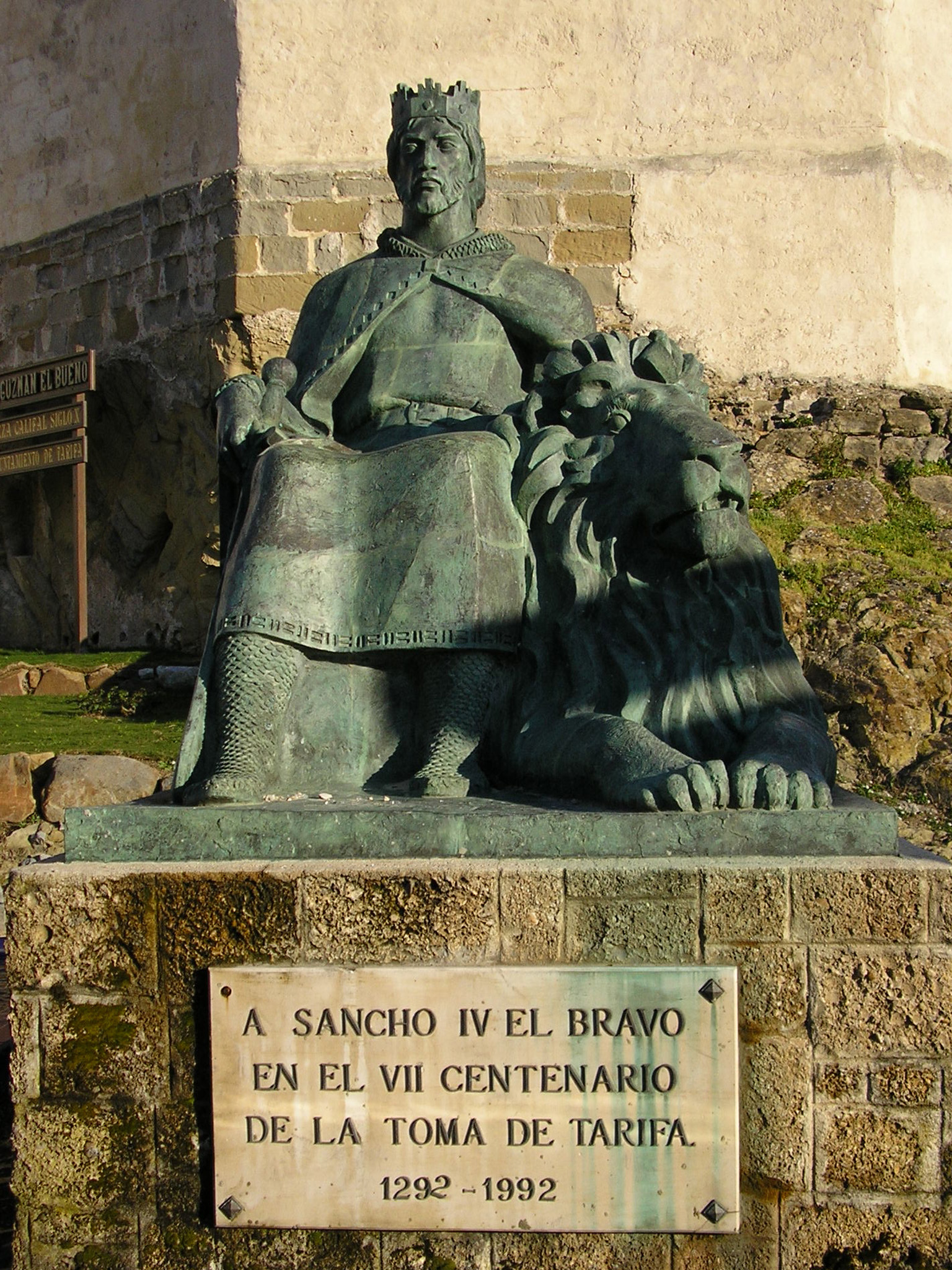
Statue of Sancho IV of Castile. Tarifa.

In 1285 Sultan Abu Yusuf Yaqub laid siege to Jerez de la Frontera. Álvaro Núñez de Lara accompanied King Sancho on the successful expedition to raise the siege. Thereafter, he was part of the group of nobles which advised King Sancho to wage battle against the Muslims, a course opposed by infante John "el de Tarifa" and Lope Díaz III de Haro, Lord of Biscay, who threatened to abandon the king if he insisted on fighting the Muslims, and explained that he should content himself with having achieved the raising of the siege of Jerez de la Frontera.

In 1285 Álvaro Núñez de Lara confirmed various privileges granted by King Sancho. On 6 December infante Ferdinand, the son of King Sancho and Queen María de Molina and heir to the throne of Castile and León, was born. The next year Álvaro joined the King on pilgrimage to Santiago de Compostela.

In 1286, due to his hostility toward Lope Díaz III de Haro, the king's favorite, he left Castile and headed for Portugal. From there, aided by his friendship with infante Alfonso of Portugal, he began to attack Castilian territory, using as bases the border fortresses controlled by the infante, who was at the time at odds with his brother, King Denis. Denis, who enjoyed good relations with King Sancho, thereupon ordered the councils of the border towns to attack his brother and Álvaro Núñez de Lara, who lost many of their men in several skirmishes with the Portuguese troops. Shortly thereafter, the castle of Arronches, which was in the hands of infante Alfonso, was besieged by the forces of the kings of Portugal and Castile. Nonetheless, on 13 December 1286, after several months of siege, King Denis signed a peace treaty with his brother Alfonso, by which Alfonso was forced to hand over the castle of Arronches to the king in exchange for the castle of Armamar.

Due to the growing influence in Castile of Lope Díaz III de Haro, Álvaro Núñez de Lara was persuaded to return and, using his own power and influence, thwart the abuses and outrages perpetrated by him.

Álvaro Núñez de Lara died at the beginning of 1287, shortly after his return to Castile, without having married and without leaving any children.

== Bibliography ==
- Estepa Díez, Carlos (2006). "Doña Juana Núñez y el señorío de los Lara". Revue interdisciplinaire d'études hispaniques médiévales (in Spanish) (1). Paris: SEMH-Sorbonne. doi:10.4000/e-spania.315. hdl:10261/15148.
- González Jiménez, Manuel (2004). Alfonso X el Sabio (in Spanish) (1ª ed.). Barcelona: Editorial Ariel S. A. ISBN 84-344-6758-5.
- Ibáñez de Segovia Peralta y Mendoza, Gaspar, Marqués de Mondejar (1777). Memorias historicas del Rei D. Alonso el Sabio i observaciones a su chronica (in Spanish). Madrid: Joachin Ibarra.
- Loaysa, Jofré de; García Martínez, Antonio (1982). Crónicas de los Reyes de Castilla Fernando III, Alfonso X, Sancho IV y Fernando IV (1248-1305) (in Spanish) (2ª ed.). Murcia: Academia Alfonso X el Sabio, Colección Biblioteca Murciana de bolsillo Nº 27. ISBN 84-00-05017-7.
- Salazar y Castro, Luis de (1697). Historia genealógica de la Casa de Lara (in Spanish). Vol. 3. Madrid: Mateo de Llanos y Guzmán.
