= Siege of Albarracín (1284) =

Coordinates: 40.4000°N 1.4500°W

- Part of the War of the Castilian Succession (1284–90)
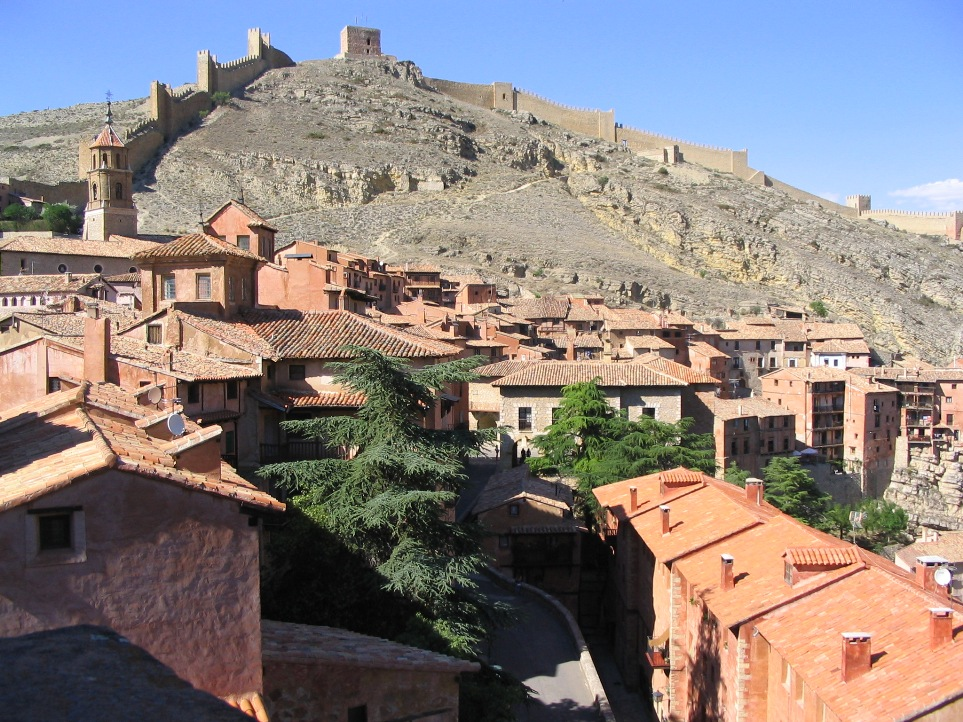
- View of the city of Albarracín.
Date	April–September, 1284
Location	Albarracín, Spain
Result	Victory for the Kingdom of Aragon, incorporation of Albarracín into the Kingdom of Aragon.

Belligerents
Kingdom of Aragón	House of Lara; Lordship of Albarracín

Commanders and leaders
Peter III of Aragon	Juan Núñez I de Lara

Strength
	200 knights

The siege of Albarracín was a battle fought during the reign of Peter III of Aragon, King of Aragón from the months of April to September 1284. Albarracín, which had for some time belonged to Juan Núñez I de Lara, the head of the House of Lara, was besieged by an Aragonese force. The siege resulted in the successful taking of the city by Aragonese forces after which, Peter III gifted the city to his illegitimate son, Ferdinand of Aragón.

== Context ==
Albarracín was a Señorío of Muslim origin that formed part of the Muslim Kingdom of Valencia. The Señorío was formed when a Navarese noble from the House of Azagra militarily helped the Valencian kingdom. The Lordship of Albarracín was granted to this noble who repopulated the city with people from Navarre. After the conquest of Valencia by James I of Aragon, the territory was left in a legal vacuum. The local nobility, taking advantage of the questionable legal status, declared their independence (de facto) from both Valencia and Aragon.

After the death of the infante Ferdinand de la Cerda, the eldest son of Alfonso X of Castile, the forces of the infante Sancho and those of Alfonso de la Cerda, there began a period of war for succession to the throne of the Kingdom of Castile. The contemporary lord or Señor de Albarracín was Juan I Núñez de Lara. In 1284, he was supporting the claim of the Infantes de la Cerda (although his allegiance would shift various times) and along with them, he had forged an alliance with the Kingdom of Navarre and the Kingdom of France, the alliance stipulated in the Treaty of Ágreda of 1281.

In an effort to strike at Juan I Núñez de Lara, Sancho IV made a deal with the Kingdom of Aragon which ceded sovereignty over the Lordship of Albarracín, which had up until then been a part of the Kingdom of Castile, to Peter III of Aragon upon its capture by either Castilian or Aragonese forces. Prior to his support of the de la Cerda claims to the throne, Juan I Núñez of Lara was a subject of the Castilian crown.

Shortly after the Bordeaux Challenge, Juan Núñez I ambushed Peter III of Aragon with the goal of taking him prisoner back to France to be presented to Philip III of France. In June 1283, Peter III was in the area of Tarazona conducting attack on Navarre and Aragón in which he conquered and sacked various towns, the Castle of Ull amongst them.

== The battle ==
In winter of 1283, whilst Juan Núñez I de Lara was in Treviño raising Navarese reinforcements to defend his city from the Aragonese who had by then declared war against him, he was besieged by Peter III of Aragon at Albarracín with only around 200 knights.

From April until September 1284, the besieging forces built their camp in the streets of the town of Albarracín (literally on Calle de los Palacios) for their soldiers to remain under cover and in comfort with stores and housing for the winter. On 29 September 1284, after many months of siege, the city surrendered and was occupied by troops of the Crown of Aragon. The Aragonese king, upon capturing the city, gave it as a gift to his illegitimate child with Inés Zapata, Ferdinand of Aragon.

== Consequences ==
Although Juan Núñez II de Lara, son of the defeated Juan Núñez I attempted various times to retake his ancestral property of Albarracín back from the Aragonese, the city eventually passed to the Aragonese Crown.

== See also ==
- Juan I Núñez de Lara
- Peter III of Aragon
- Sancho IV of Castile
