= Álvaro Núñez =

Álvaro Núñez may refer to:

- Álvaro Núñez de Lara (died 1218), Castilian nobleman and knight
- Álvaro Núñez de Lara (died 1287), Castilian nobleman
- Álvaro Núñez (footballer, born 1973), Uruguayan football goalkeeper
- Álvaro Núñez (footballer, born 2000), Spanish football left-back for Amorebieta

== See also ==
- Álvar Núñez Cabeza de Vaca (1488-1560?), Spanish explorer
