= Juan Núñez I de Lara =

Spanish noble (died 1294)

Juan Núñez I de Lara El Gordo
- Head of the House of Lara and Señor de Albarracín
- Arms of the House of Lara
- Successor: Juan Núñez II de Lara
- Died: April 1294; Córdoba, Andalusia, Kingdom of Castile
- Buried: Convento de San Pablo de Burgos
- Noble family: House of Lara
- Spouses: Teresa Álvarez de Azagra; Teresa de Haro
- Issue Detail: Juan Núñez II de Lara; Nuño González de Lara; Juana Núñez de Lara
- Father: Nuño González de Lara
- Mother: Teresa Alfonso de León

Juan Núñez I de Lara y León (died Córdoba, April 1294), also known as "el Gordo" or "the Fat", was a Spanish noble. He was the head of the House of Lara, Lord of Lerma, Amaya, Dueñas, Palenzuela, Tordehumos, Torrelobatón, and la Mota. He was further known as Señor de Albarracín through his first marriage with Teresa Álvarez de Azagra.

== Family Origins ==
Juan was the son of Nuño González de Lara el Bueno, head of the House of Lara and his wife, Teresa Alfonso de León, the granddaughter of King Alfonso IX of Leon. His paternal grandparents were Gonzalo Núñez de Lara and his wife, María Díaz de Haro y Azagra. He was the brother of Nuño González de Lara y León, lord of Estella-Lizarra and ricohombre of Castile, of Teresa Núñez de Lara y León who married Gil Gómez de Roa, and of María Núñez de Lara y León who married Diego Gómez de Roa.

== Biography ==
=== Childhood and time during the reign of Alfonso X El Sabio ===
Juan Núñez' exact date of birth is unknown. On 2 February 1266, was declared a vassal of Santa María and the Señor de Albarracín. Together with his brother, Nuño González de Lara y León the brothers donated certain goods to Mayor Alfonso, the abbess of the Monasterio de Santa María y San Andrés A few months later on 25 July 1266 together with his brother Nuño González, he was confirmed in a document affirming the commitment of certain nobles of Caleruega to their donations to the King, Alfonso X of Castile. These donations were made for the purpose of acquiring the Monastery at Caleruega and confirming that other ricoshombres with interests in Caleruega accepted this claim over the monastery.

Juan Núñez I de Lara accompanied King Louis IX of France and Theobald II of Navarre during the Eighth Crusade and was with them in Tunis. He participated in this crusade without the consent of Alfonso X, but was nevertheless able to retain all of his lands and titles under his crown.

During the revolts of the nobility of 1272–1273, in which Juan Núñez I supported the positions of his father and other rebel magnates against the infante Philip of Castile. Philip was the brother of Alfonso X of Castile. Juan Núñez tried to remain loyal to the king, who had at the beginning of the rebellion, given him a mission together with Gonzalo Pérez Gudiel, the bishop of Cuenca, to persuade the infante Philip and other magnates to break their agreements with the Kingdom of Navarre. Following this unsuccessful attempt, Juan Núñez accompanied his father, Nuño González de Lara "el Bueno" when he and the rebellious magnates abandoned the Kingdom of Castile and Leon and sought refuge in the Nazarí Emirate of Granada. During his stay in Granada and throughout the actual revolt, he participated together with his father in peace negotiations between the Crown of Castile and the Kingdom of Granada and the nobles in rebellion.

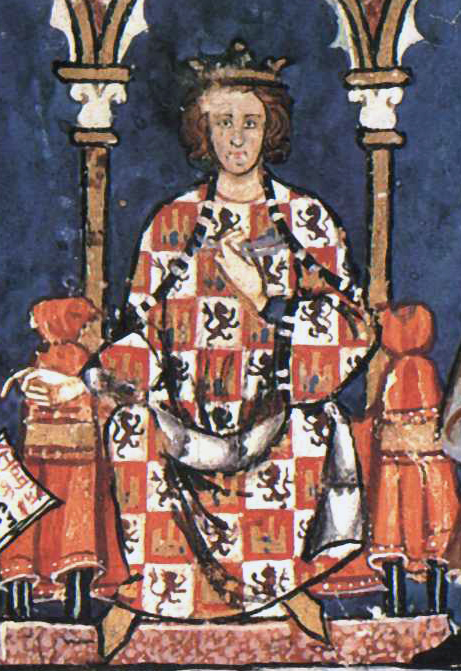
Painting depicting King Alfonso X of Castile.

At the beginning of 1273, Juan Núñez I de Lara, who had up until now acted as a mediating force together with the bishop of Cuenca between his father and the King, abandoned the Castilian crown and embraced his role as a rebellious noble. In winter of 1273, at the city of Tudela, the infante Philip of Castile, Lope Díaz III de Haro, Álvar Díaz de Asturias, Nuño González de Lara "el Bueno" and his sons, Juan Núñez I de Lara, and Nuño González de Lara y León amongst other magnates, gathered to pay homage and swear allegiance to Henry I of Navarre. It was here that Juan Núñez I offered the Navarese king a list of grievances that he and the other former Castilian nobles had against their former king, Alfonso X. The former Castilian nobles, in their succession, took new oaths to serve the Kingdom of Navarre as they had previously served the Muslim King of Granada.

Despite the betrayal of many of his nobles, it was Alfonso's wish to pursue his goal of attaining the Fecha del Imperio (title of the Holy Roman Emperor). With this goal in mind, he allowed some of the members of the royal family resume negotiations with the rebel nobles. Amongst these mediators were the infantes Ferdinand de la Cerda and Manuel of Castile, the queen, Violant of Aragon, and Archbishop of Toledo, Sancho de Aragón, son of James I of Aragon. After much negotiation, Alfonso X, advised by his brother Frederick of Castile and Simón Ruiz de los Cameros, the Castilian monarch accepted most of the demands of the exiled nobles, presenting the final agreement to Nuño González de Lara "el Bueno", who in 1273, met with the queen, Violant of Aragon in the city of Córdoba. At the end of that same year, the exiled nobles returned to the Kingdom of Castile. At the same time, Muhammed II al-Faqih, the Sultan of Granada, declared himself and his kingdom, a vassal of Alfonso X, even though the chronicles of King Alfonso X erroneously state that this announcement did not come until 1274. In July 1273, Fernando Rodríguez de Castro, Simón Ruiz de los Cameros, and Diego López V de Haro, the younger brother of Lope Díaz III de Haro were all confirmed as being entered back into the royal diplomas. It was not until early the following year, 1274, when Nuño González de Lara "el Bueno" and his children, amongst other nobles, were allowed back onto the rolls themselves. Juan Núñez' father, Nuño González reappeared on the royal rolls on 24 January 1247 and was reinstated to privileges not received since 14 July 1272. According to the chronicles of Alfonso X, he was reinstated in early 1274 when he was named the Adelantado Mayor de la Frontera de Andalucia.

In 1273, Juan Núñez I de Lara formed part of the embassy sent by Alfonso X to Pope Gregory X. During this trip, the Castilian monarch attempted unsuccessfully to convince the Pope to support his claims to the Imperial Roman throne. Instead, the pope attempted to convince Alfonso X to drop this ambition.

He was further present at the Cortes de Toledo of 1275, where he assisted his father and brother in their goals and where Alfonso X entrusted the government of his kingdom to his firstborn son, the infante Ferdinand de la Cerda. The king announced his decision to travel to France and Germany where he would seek to be crowned officially as the Holy Roman Emperor.

During the absence of Alfonso X of Castile, Juan Núñez I accompanied the infante Ferdinand de la Cerda as he carried out his official duties. On 25 July 1275, the infante Ferdinand de la Cerda died in Ciudad Real whilst awaiting reinforcements in a fight against the Marinid Dynasty in Andalucía. Before his death, Ferdinand asked Juan Núñez I to work in his interests to protect the succession rights of his children, the infantes, Alfonso de la Cerda, and Ferdinand de la Cerda, known as the Infantes de la Cerda, for Ferdinand knew that their succession would be in doubt given his young age and their weak standing at the time of his death. After Ferdinand de la Cerda's death, Juan Núñez I joined the caravan that conducted the infante's cadaver to the Abbey of Santa María la Real de Las Huelgas where he was interred.

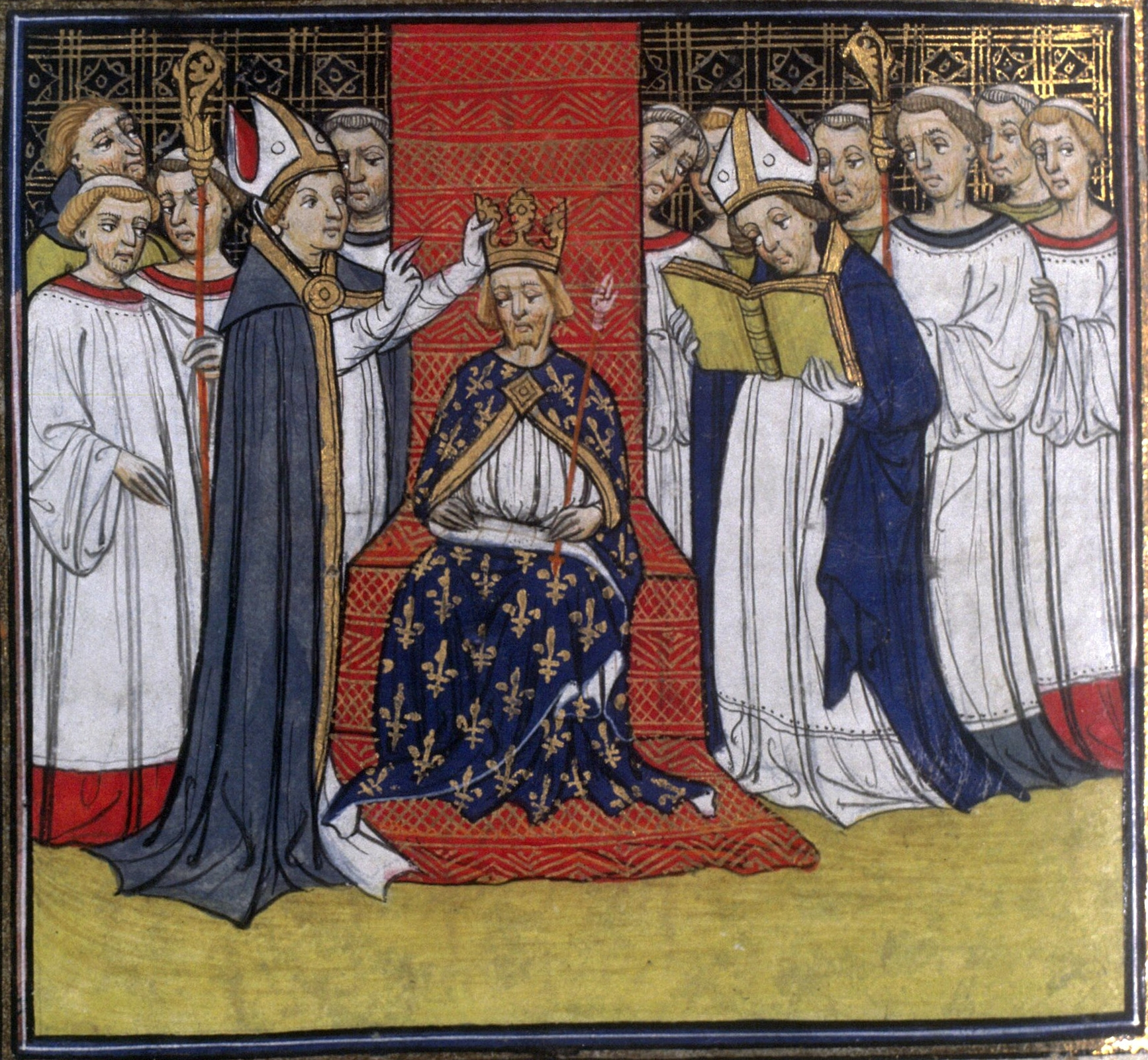
Medieval miniature that represents the coronation of Philip III of France.

After the death of Ferdinand de la Cerda, the infante Sancho, the oldest living son of Alfonso X of Castile and Lope Díaz III de Haro, Lord of Biscay arrived at the Ciudad Real. Lope Díaz III agreed to help Sancho obtain his claim to the throne of Castile and supplant the Cerda infantes in return for protection of his interests. Lope Díaz III gathered his vassals at Ciudad Real to announce his decision to support Sancho's claim to the throne as Alfonso X's legitimate successor. The group also vowed to defend the kingdom against Muslim attackers at Castile's borders.

In early September 1275, Nuño González de Lara "el Bueno", Juan Núñez I's father died at the Battle of Écija where Castilian forces were defeated by forces of the Marinid Dynasty who had invaded Andalucía. His father's head was sent by the Marinid King of Granada to Córdoba in a move he apparently considered to be a gesture of goodwill as Nuño González had previously been in the service of the Emirate of Granada. Nuño González was buried along with the rest of his body at the Convento de San Pablo de Palencia

After the death of his father, Juan Núñez I inherited the title of the Head of the House of Lara and became the preeminent defender of the rights to the throne of the infantes de la Cerda as he had promised Philip of Castile. His principal rival, Lope Díaz III de Haro, Lord of Biscay, became the principal defender of the claims of Sancho of Castile.

Juan Núñez I abandoned the Kingdom of Castile in September 1276 to join the service of Philip III of France. He was joined in his French exile by his brother, Nuño González de Lara y León. Whilst in France, the two brothers became the primary defenders of the Cerda line of succession within the French kingdom. In the Treaty of Vitoria of November 1276, signed by Alfonso X of Castile and Philip III of France, Alfonso X promises to return all lands confiscated from Juan Núñez I de Lara and give them back to him and his heirs although the clauses of this part of the treaty were not vigorously stated.

After Alfonso X and Peter III of Aragon came to an agreement at Vistas de Campillo that the Aragonese monarch would renounce his rights over the Señorío de Albarracín, the infante Sancho IV, who had become an enemy of his father on the issue of the Cerda infantes, solicited the Aragonese monarch to support his claims to the Castilian throne in return for his reinstatement to lordship over Albarracin.

In 1283, Juan Núñez I, together with his son, Álvaro Núñez de Lara, the infante James of Castile, Lord of Cameros, and Juan Alfonso de Haro, continued to wage war against the infante Sancho. The three Cerda supporters along with their vassals had taken power over the municipality of Treviño. Upon hearing this, Sancho sent Lope Diaz III de Haro along with his army to Treviño to confront them. Regardless, no battle took place there between these forces. On 4 April 1284, King Alfonso X of Castile died in the city of Seville. He was succeeded to the throne by his eldest son, Sancho IV of Castile, the enemy of Juan Núñez I and his interests.

=== Actions during the reign of Sancho IV El Bravo (1276–1294) ===
On 29 September 1284, after many months of siege by the Aragonese troops of King Peter III of Aragon on the city of Albarracín gave in and was occupied by the Aragonese troops. After the Siege of Albarracín, the Aragonese monarch gave the city and the lordship of Albarracín to Fernando de Aragón, his illegitimate son by Inés Zapata. After the capitulation of Albarracín, Juan Núñez I continued to serve Philip III of France. In 1285, the troops of the House of Lara were defeated by the Aragonese.

In 1287, his eldest son, Álvaro Núñez de Lara died. Álvaro Núñez was Juan Núñez I's firstborn son although some of the chronicles of Alfonso X and Sancho IV refer to him as Juan's brother. In 1288, Sancho IV of Castile assassinated his former vassal, Lope Díaz III de Haro, the Lord of Biscay and ordered the imprisonment of his brother, John of Castile whose had only been spared by intervention of their mother, the Queen Violant of Aragon. John of Castile was imprisoned in Burgos by order of the king.

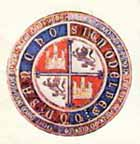
Royal seal of Sancho IV de Castilla, King of Castile.

In 1289, after coming to an agreement with Sancho IV over the towns of Moya and Cañete, Juan Núñez I returned to the Kingdom of Castile and sent his daughter, Juana Núñez de Lara to María de Molina, wife of Sancho IV so that she could be raised in the court as agreed by the agreement aforementioned. After his return to the capital, Sancho IV named Juan Núñez I, the new Lord of Biscay as the Frontero de Aragón with the stipulation that he fight Diego López IV de Haro, the new Lord of Biscay and Alfonso III of Aragon who had declared war against Sancho IV. Nevertheless, before starting his post as Frontero, Juan Núñez I inspected his lands in Burgos which had been attacked by Pedro Díaz de Castañeda and his brother, Nuño Díaz de Castañeda, supporters of the Lord of Biscay. In revenge, Juan Núñez I proposed to devastate the region of Asturias de Santillana where the family of Pedro Díaz possessed many areas even though Sancho IV strictly ordered him not to do so as the House of Castañeda was powerful in Asturias. Juan Núñez I continued his war against the Kingdom of Aragon and against Diego Lopez IV de Haro who died in 1289.

In April 1290, Juan Núñez I was with the king at Burgos when some members of the court alienated the lord of Lara by telling him that Sancho IV was plotting his death. They informed him that if he returned to the palace that he would be assassinated. For this reason, the Lord of Lara retired with his knights to the municipality of San Andrés de Arroyo. Once he was there, both the king and the queen attempted to assure him that they did not wish him any harm. Nevertheless, Lara decided against returning to court although he did accept a meeting with the queen, María de Molina in the city of Valladolid. Initially it seemed as if the king and the Lord of Lara had reached a quick agreement, however this was quickly thrown into confusion when the king agreed to truce with Diego López V de Haro, the sworn enemy of the House of Lara. Juan Núñez I again abandoned the court and fled to the Kingdom of Navarre and afterwards to the Kingdom of Aragon.

Shortly after moving to the Kingdom of Aragon, Juan Núñez I began to dedicate himself to the recuperation of the señorío de Albarracín. Together with his troops, he invaded the Kingdom of Castile and attacked the area of Cuenca and Alarcón. Once there, the Aragonese-Leonese troops reached him commanded by Esteban Fernández de Castro, the Lord of Lemos, Ruy Gil de Villalobos, and Juan Fernández de León "Cabellos de Oro" illegitimate grandson of Alfonso IX of León and head Majordomo of Sancho IV of Castile. In the battle that followed, the soldiers of Juan Núñez I routed the Castilian-Leonese troops. After this victory, the Lord of Lara returned to Aragon where on August 22, 1290, in the city of Valencia, he paid homage to Alfonso III of Aragon along with his son, Juan Núñez II de Lara. Juan Núñez I vowed to aid Alfonso III of Aragon in his fight against Sancho IV and to give refuge in his castles to the Aragonese monarch and his troops.

By the end of 1290, Juan Núñez I had become angry with the King of Aragon for although he had been promised the return of lordship over Albarracín, it became evident that this deal would never happen. Eventually, Juan Núñez I accepted repeated offers by Sancho IV and returned to the Kingdom of Castile. Before his return to Castile, he had his son, Juan Núñez II, marry Isabel Alfonso de Molina, daughter of Alfonso Fernández de Castilla and Blanca Alfonso de Molina who was the daughter of the queen, María de Molina and Juan Fernández "Cabellos de Oro" to safeguard against any ill will by either Sancho IV or the kingdom's nobility. The marriage was celebrated upon Juan Núñez I's return to Castile. Isabel Alfonso de Molina was also the heiress by part of her mother, of the Real Señorío de Molina, a title which had long before belonged to the House of Lara. Shortly after, Juan Núñez I was with King Sancho IV at the city of Toledo after having accompanied him to Cuenca. It was there that the Lord of Lara was informed by a knight that the Castilian king was again plotting his death. The king quickly sent word to Lara that the accusation was false and named the person who delivered this message to Juan Núñez I a false knight in the presence of the entire court.

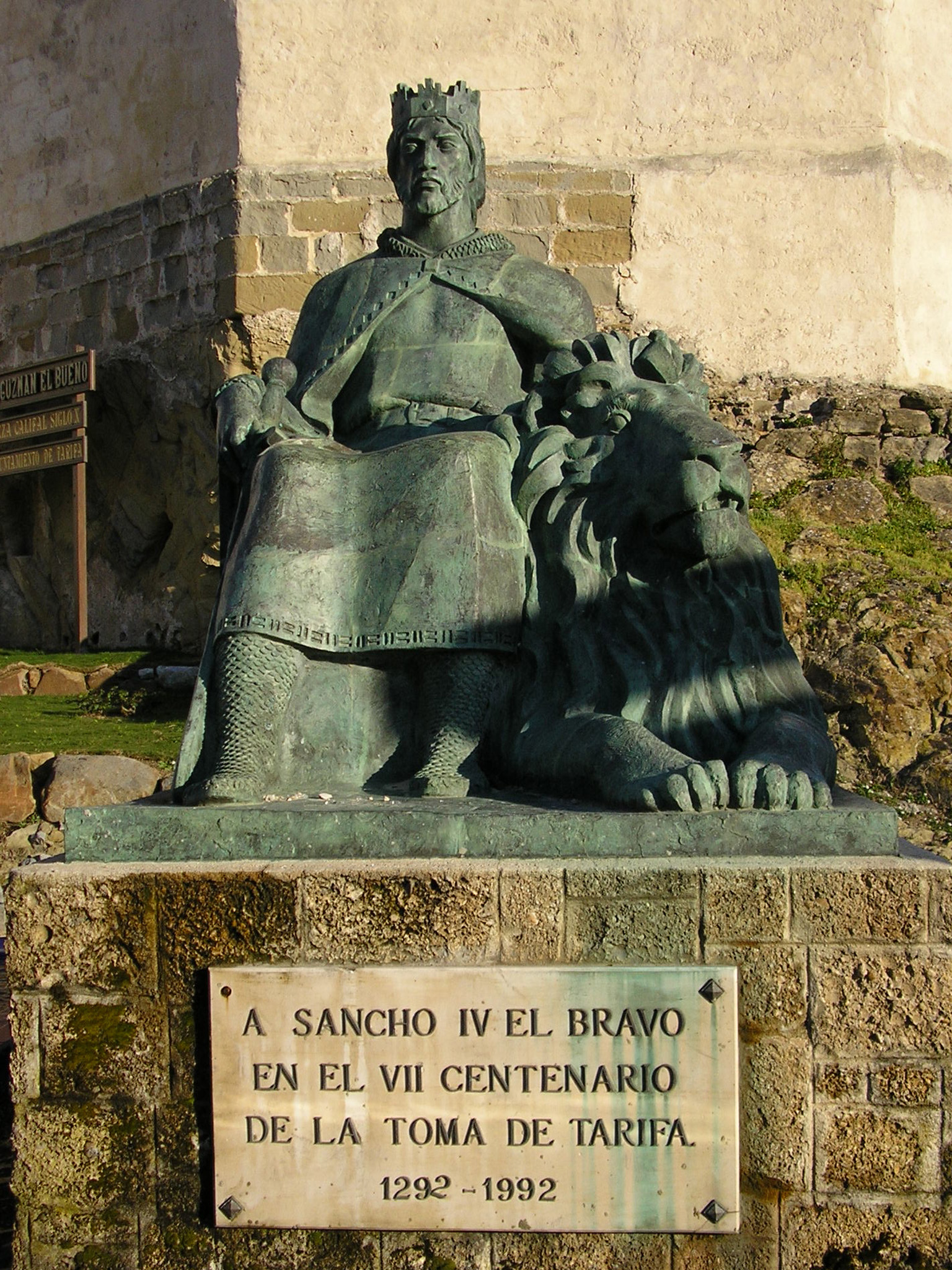
Statue of Sancho IV of Castile, King of Castile and León. Tarifa, Cádiz.

Soon after this incident, Juan Núñez I allied himself with Juan Alfonso de Meneses, Lord of Alburquerque against Sancho IV and the two of them persuaded the king to release his brother, the infante John of Castile who had been in prison since 1288 when he and Lope Díaz III de Haro were uncovered in a plot. Haro was assassinated by order of the king for his role in this plot. By 1291, Sancho IV and Juan Núñez I agreed that Juana Núñez de Lara, Juan Núñez I's daughter, would marry the infante Alfonso de Castilla y Molina, the son of King Sancho IV. However, the infante Alfonso died in 1291 in Valladolid at the age of 5. Due to the past agreement between Sancho IV and the Lord of Lara, James II of Aragon, the new King of Aragon and brother of Alfonso III of Aragon, desisted for the moment in his policy of support for the succession claims of Alfonso de la Cerda.

In 1292, Juan Núñez I once again became the enemy of Sancho IV of Castile and fled the Kingdom of Castile. He again went to France where he took refuge in the service of Philip IV of France. After an embassy sent by Sancho IV to Philip IV however, the French monarch stopped supporting the Cerda brothers' claim to the throne and also stopped his support for Juan Núñez I, all of whom were refuging in France.

In August 1292, Isabel Alfonso de Molina, the daughter in law of Juan Núñez I with his son, Juan Núñez II de Lara, and the daughter of Sancho IV, died. His familial obligations to Sancho IV officially cut off, Juan Núñez I's son, Juan Núñez II de Lara wasted no time and joined his father in rebellion against the king together with the king's brother, John of Castile. During the following conflict, Juan Núñez II and John of Castile were defeated. The king's brother fled to the Kingdom of Portugal and Juan Núñez II was obliged to seek reconciliation with Sancho IV. Shortly after, Juan Núñez I returned to the Kingdom of Castile and offered his services to Sancho IV to fight against his former ally, John of Castile who together with Juan Alfonso de Meneses, lord of Alburquerque, had invaded the kingdom. While Sancho IV made his way to the front to meet with James II of Aragon, Juan Núñez I began fighting John of Castile who defeated him and made him prisoner in a battle that took place in the municipality of Zamorano de Peleas. Shortly after this defeat, Juan Núñez II de Lara who had accompanied the king to meet with James II of Aragon, abandoned the royal caravan and left for the Kingdom of Portugal to solicit the release of his father.

For his part, Juan Núñez I who had been held prisoner by John of Castile, persuaded John that he would aid him in his recuperation of the Lordship of Biscay, which his wife, María Díaz I de Haro and Diego López V de Haro were fighting for control over. The Lord of Lara further proposed to John of Castile that the King of Portugal should rubricate any agreement between them. Further, after he was set free by the infante John, Juan Núñez I solicited the protection of King Denis of Portugal, who helped him return to the Kingdom of Castile.

After returning to Castile, Sancho IV absolved him any oath paid to John of Castile and the Lord of Lara traveled to his lands in Castile. Shortly after, Sancho IV of Castile sent Juan Núñez I to Andalucía to defend the frontier against the armies of Muhammed II al-Faqih who had allied himself with the King of Morocco.

== Death and Sepulcher ==
Juan Núñez I de Lara died in Córdoba in April 1294. His body was transferred to the city of Burgos where he was buried at the Convento de San Pablo de Burgos, a convent belonging to the Dominican Order. His remains disappeared together with his sepulcher when the convent was sacked and destroyed by French forces during the Peninsular War. Later, the ruins of the convent which were still standing, were demolished by the army in 1870 to build a barracks.

== Marriage and Descendants ==
Juan's first marriage occurred sometime before the year 1260 with Teresa Álvarez de Azagra. She was the daughter of Álvaro Pérez de Azagra, Vassal of Santa María and lord of Albarracín, and his wife, Inés, the illegitimate daughter of King Theobald I of Navarre. One son was born to the couple:

- Álvaro Núñez de Lara (c. 1261 – 1287).

His second marriage was with Teresa de Haro, daughter of Diego López III de Haro, Lord of Biscay, and his wife, Constanza de Bearne. Four children were born from this marriage:

- Juan Núñez II de Lara (c. 1276 – 1315).
- Nuño González de Lara (c. 1284 – 1296).
- Juana Núñez de Lara (1285–1351).
- Teresa Núñez de Lara y Haro (c. 1280 - c. 1314).

== Historical Controversy ==
Luis de Salazar y Castro, a 17th-century writer focusing on historical genealogy, was mistaken in his chronicling of the House of Lara in naming four separate people named Juan Núñez de Lara. He mistakenly created two "Juan Núñez I"s, one who died in 1294 and another who died in 1276. In actuality the two are one and the same. Juan Núñez I died in 1294 but was exiled to France in 1276, an event which Castro misinterpreted as a death. In his writings, Salazar y Castro attributes to the second fictitious "Juan Núñez", a marriage with Teresa Álvarez de Azagra from which matrimony are born Juan Núñez II de Lara A.K.A. el Mozo and Juana Núñez de Lara. This marriage and its offspring were products of the Juan Núñez I of which this article writes about and historically it has only been proven that three Juan Núñez de Laras ever existed, heading the House of Lara from 1275 to 1350. This position is backed by a majority of historians.

== See also ==
- House of Lara
- House of Haro
- Sancho IV of Castile
- Señorío de Albarracín
- Siege of Albarracín (1284)

Preceded by Nuño González de Lara "el Bueno"	Head of the House of Lara; 1275–1294	Succeeded by Juan Núñez II de Lara
Preceded by Fernán Pérez I Ponce de León	Adelantado Mayor de la Frontera de Andalucía; 1292	Succeeded by Juan de Castilla
