= Álvaro Núñez de Lara =

Álvaro Núñez de Lara may refer to the following members of the House of Lara:

- Álvaro Núñez de Lara (died 1218), son of Nuño Pérez de Lara and Teresa Fernández de Traba, regent under King Henry I of Castile
- Álvaro Núñez de Lara (died 1287), son of Juan Núñez I de Lara and Teresa Álvarez de Azagra
