= Vide =

Vide may refer to:

- A Latin phrase, see vide (Latin)
- Vide (Seia), Portuguese parish
- Jacobus Vide (fl. 1405–1433), Franco-Flemish composer
- Joe Vide (born 1984), American soccer player
