= Albarracín =

- Municipality
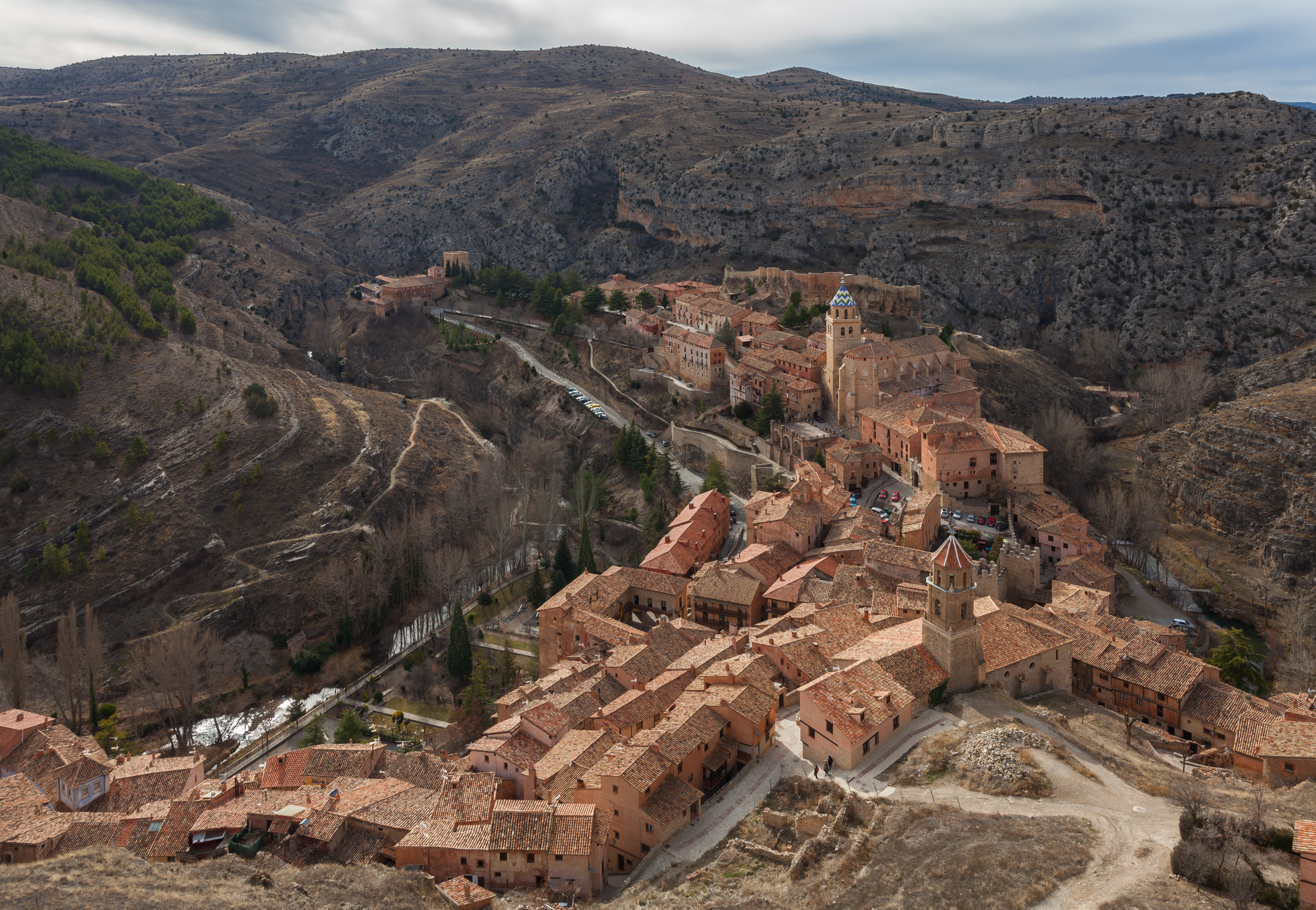
- Albarracín, in a meander of the Guadalaviar River, viewed from Torre del Andador.

- Flag Coat of arms

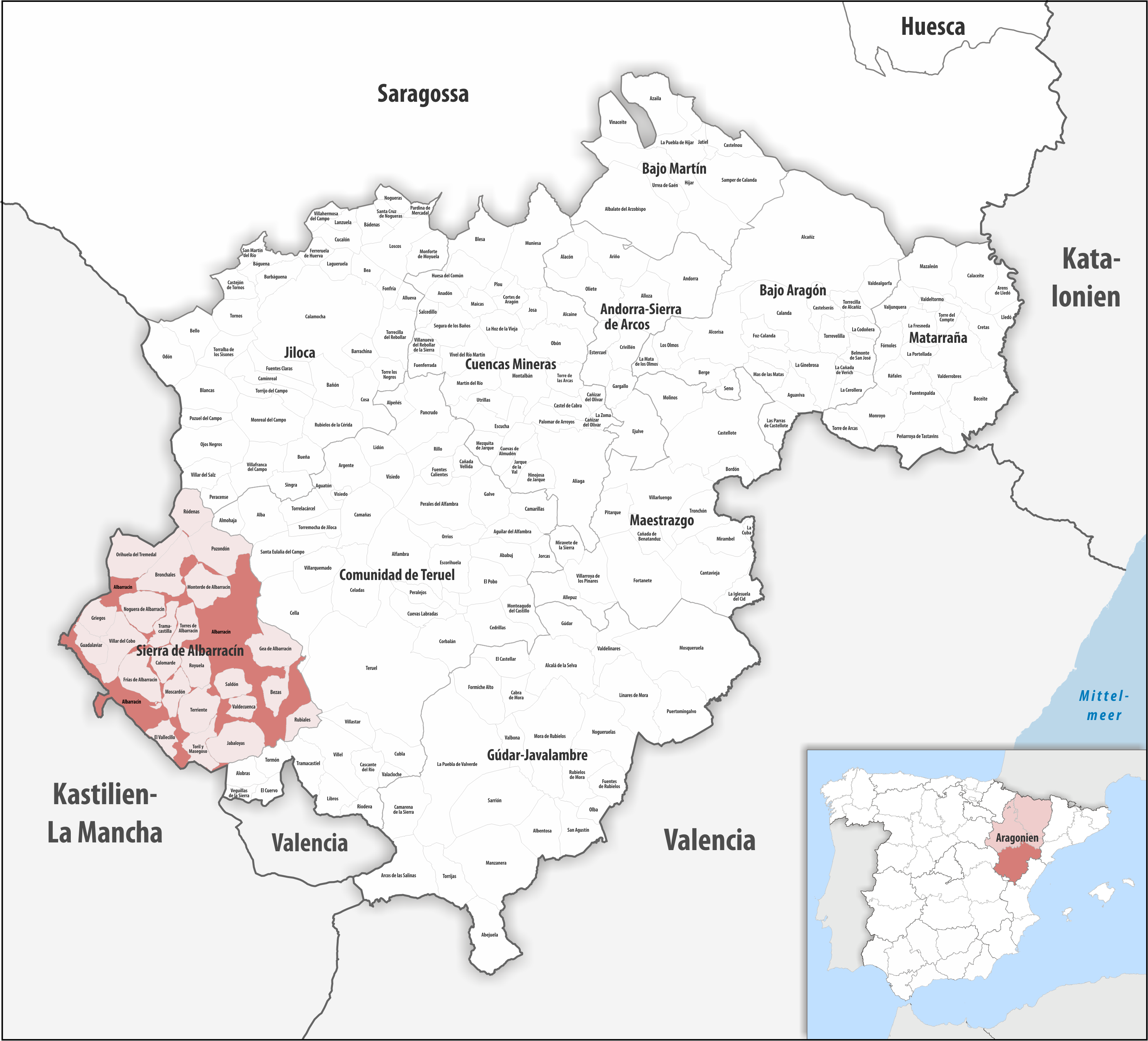

- Location in Spain
- Coordinates: 40°24′30″N 1°26′22″W
- Country: Spain
- Autonomous community: Aragón
- Province: Teruel
- Comarca: Sierra de Albarracín
- Judicial district: Teruel

Government
  - Alcalde: Daniel Úbeda Martí (2023) (PAR)

Area
  - Total: 452.72 km^{2} (174.80 sq mi)
- Elevation: 1,182 m (3,878 ft)

Population (2025-01-01)
  - Total: 998
  - Density: 2.20/km^{2} (5.71/sq mi)
- Demonyms: Albarracinense, -a Albarriciense, -a Lobetano, -a
- Time zone: UTC+1 (CET)
  - Summer (DST): UTC+2 (CEST)
- Postal code: 44100
- Dialing code: 978

Spanish Cultural Heritage
- Type: Non-movable
- Criteria: Historic ensemble
- Designated: 22 June 1961
- Reference no.: RI-53-0000030

Albarracín (Spanish pronunciation: [alβaraˈθin]) is a Spanish town, in the province of Teruel, part of the autonomous community of Aragon. According to the 2007 census (INE), the municipality had a population of 1075 inhabitants. Albarracín is the capital of the mountainous Sierra de Albarracín Comarca.

Albarracín is surrounded by stony hills and the town was declared a Monumento Nacional in 1961. The many red sandstone boulders and cliffs surrounding Albarracín make it a popular rock climbing location, particularly for boulderers.

== History ==
The town is named for the Hawwara Berber dynasty of the Banu Razin which was their capital from the early eleventh century until it was taken by the Almoravids in 1104.

From 1167 to 1300, Albarracín was an independent lordship known as the Sinyoría d'Albarrazín which was established after the partition of the Taifa of Albarracín under the control of Pedro Ruiz de Azagra. It was eventually conquered by Peter III of Aragon in 1284, and the ruling family, the House of Azagra was deposed. The last person to actually hold the title of Señor de Albarracín was Juan Núñez I de Lara, although his son, Juan Núñez II de Lara continued on as the pretender to the title until 1300 when the city and its lands were officially incorporated into the Kingdom of Aragon.

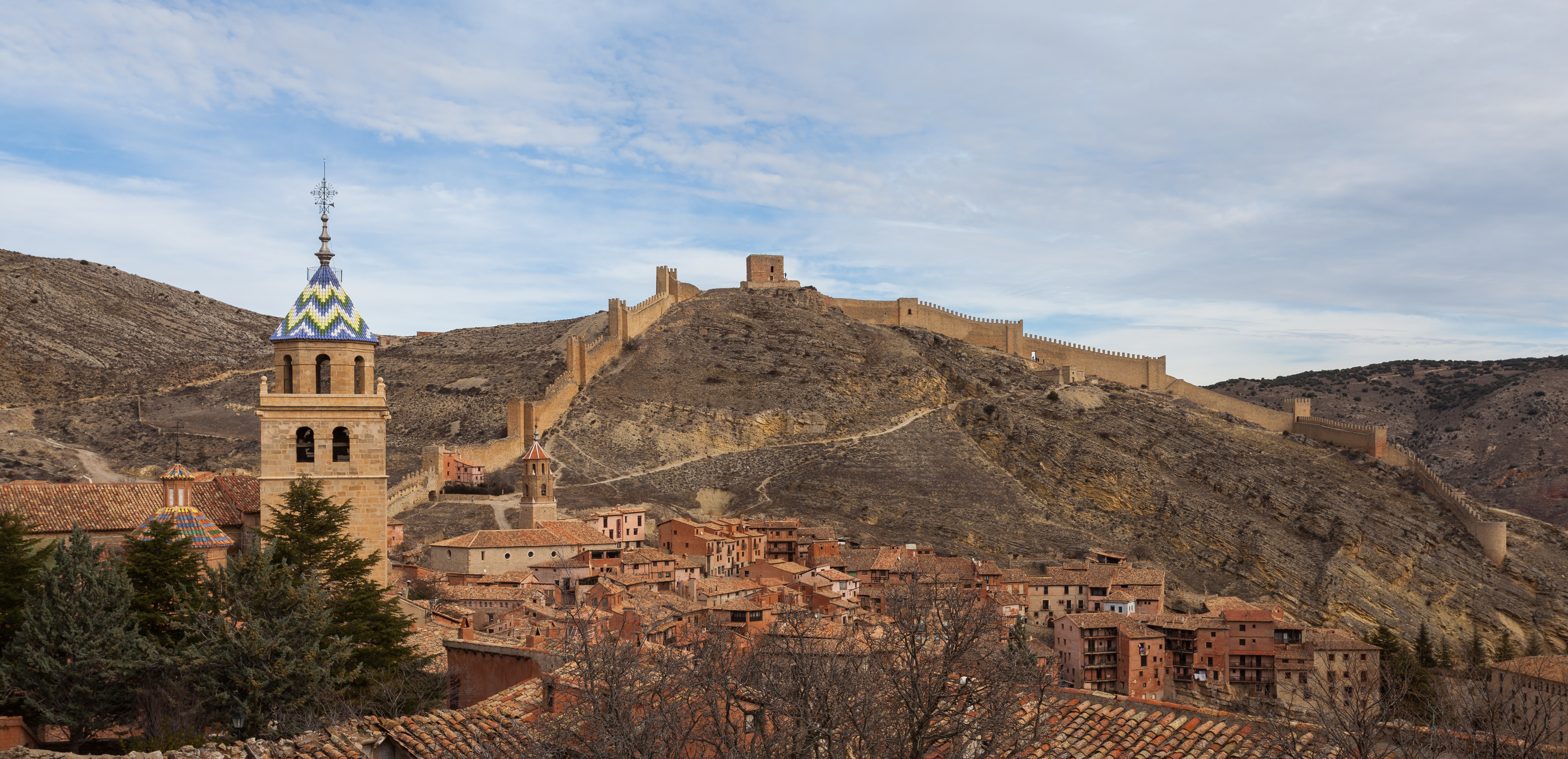
Albarracín, tower of the Albarracín Cathedral and Northern walls (with Torre del Andador on top)

In the Middle Ages, a Jewish community was present in Albarracín, with the earliest written records indicating that Jews were living in Albarracín since before the 12th century. The community suffered from incidents of antisemitism until their expulsion in 1492, during the expulsion of the Jews.

=== 20th and 21st Centuries ===
During the Spanish Civil War, battles erupted in the town between Republican and Nationalist forces, with control of the area shifting multiple times between the two factions. In July 1937, a Republican offensive targeted the town, marking the largest military confrontation there during the war. In a swift attack on July 8, Republican troops seized control of the town except for the town hall and cathedral, where military personnel and civilians who had taken refuge remained besieged. The Nationalists responded by sending reinforcements and successfully retook the town on July 13, expelling Republican forces.

The town has been a National Monument since 1961 and was awarded the Gold Medal for Merit in the Fine Arts in 1996. It is also nominated by UNESCO for World Heritage status due to the beauty and historical significance of its heritage.

Albarracín has been a member of The Most Beautiful Villages of Spain association since its founding.

== Toponymy ==
The town is situated near the ancient Roman city of Lobetum. During the Visigothic period, it was named Santa María de Oriente. The Arabs referred to the area as Alcartam, likely derived from the earlier toponym Ercávida. It later came to be called Aben Razin, after a Berber family, from which its current name is thought to originate. The toponym stems from Ibn (Ben) Razin, the Taifa kings of Albarracín who ruled from the Andalusian civil war until the reign of Ibn Mardanīs, the Wolf King of Murcia. Thus, the name signifies "the place of the sons of Razin," though its official name until the 19th century was Ciudad de Santa María de Albarracín. Another theory suggests that "Albarracín" derives from the Celtic alb (meaning "mountain") and ragin ("vineyard" or "grape"), or from the anthroponym Razin.

== Geography ==
The town is located in a meander of the Guadalaviar River. The Sierra de Albarracín mountain range rises to the South and West of the town.

== Demographic growth ==
Albarracín demographic trend
	1857	1887	1900	1910	1920	1930	1940	1950	1960	1970	1981	1991	2001	2006
Population	1,883	1,953	1,897	1,689	1,688	1,576	1,582	1,467	1,376	1,187	1,068	1,164	1,050	1,076

== See also ==
- Taifa of Albarracin
- Sinyoría d'Albarrazín
- Diocese of Teruel and Albarracín.
- Diocese of Albarracín (1577–1852).
- List of municipalities in Teruel

== Gallery ==
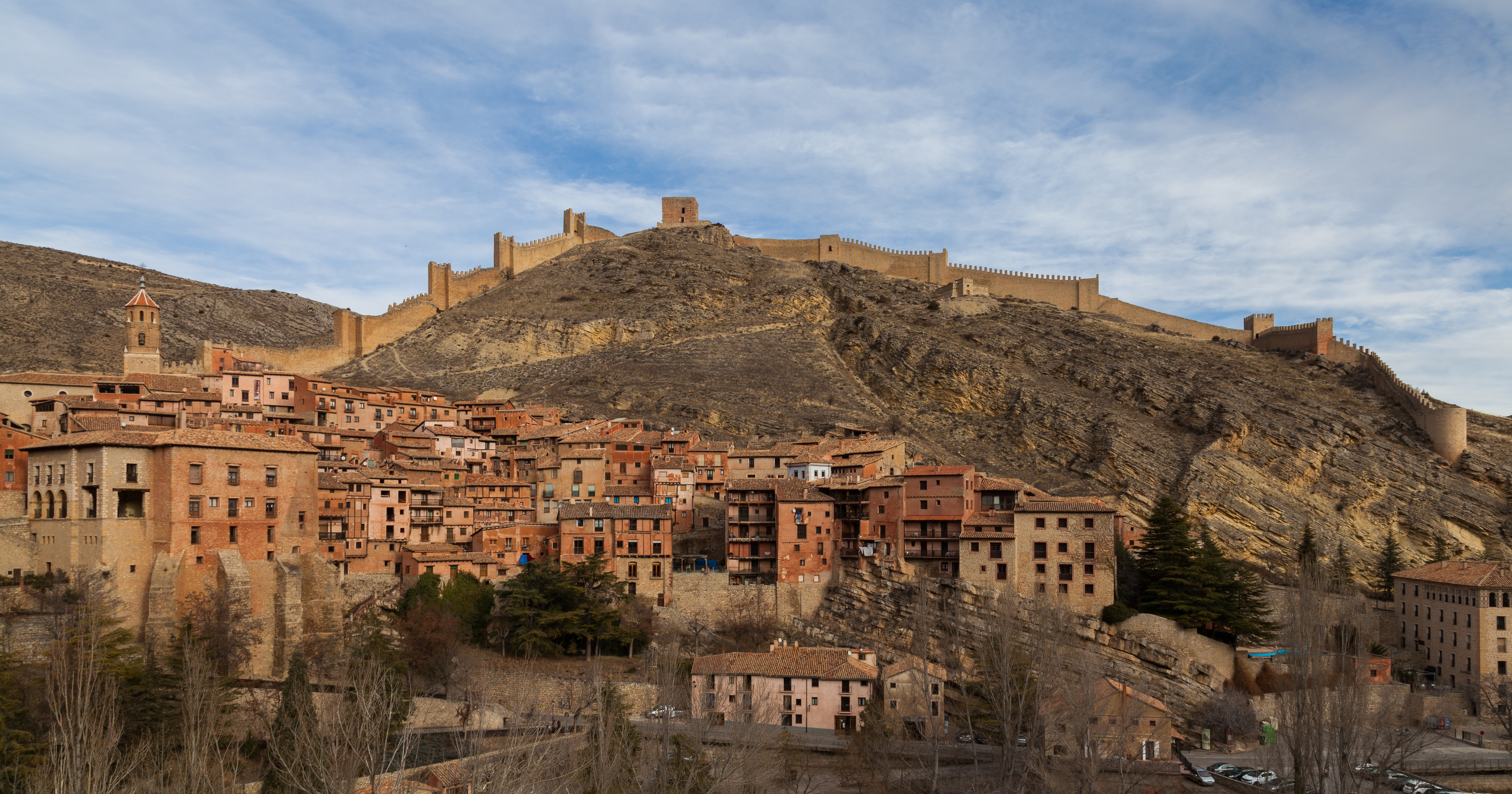
City walls.

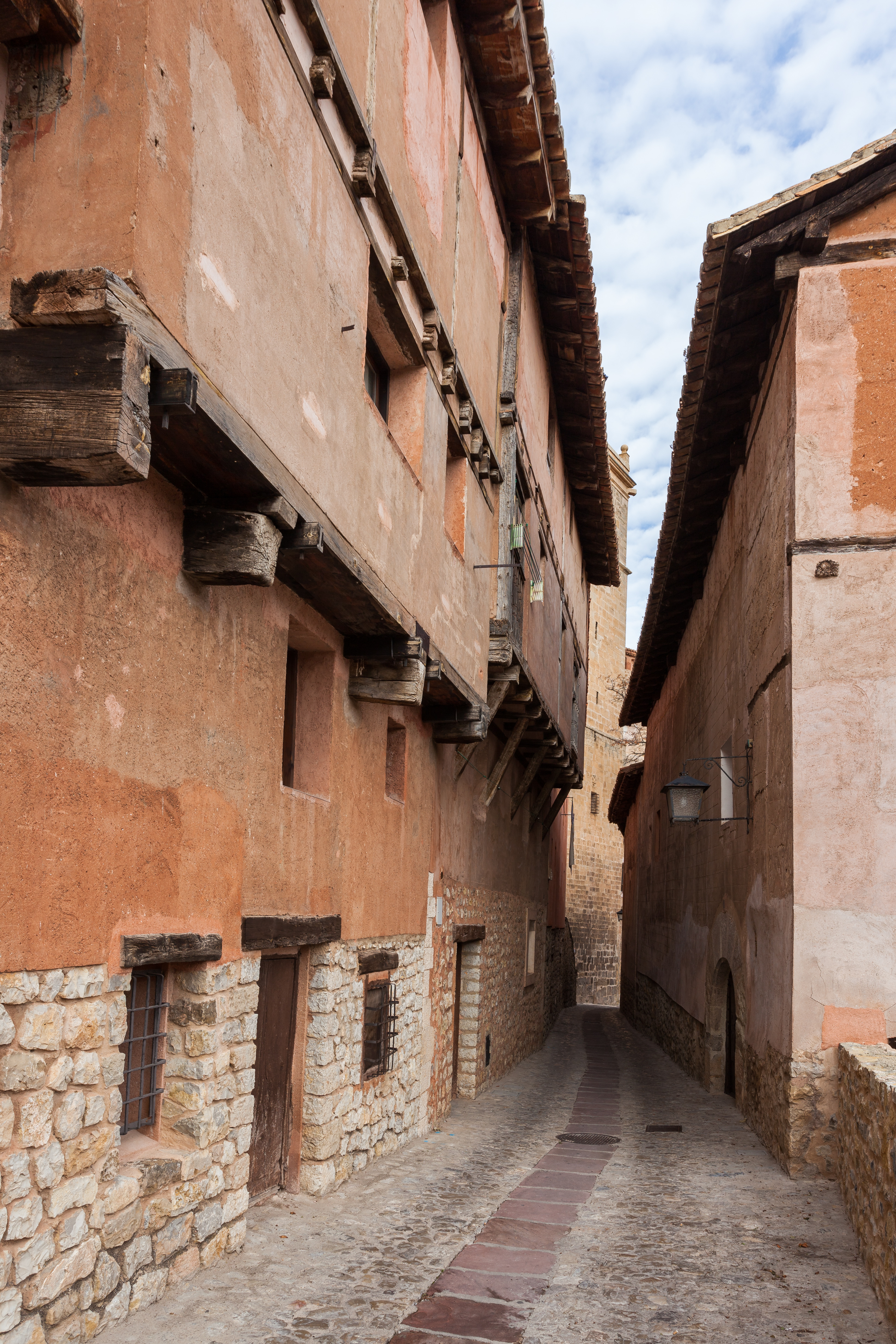
Typical narrow street in the village.

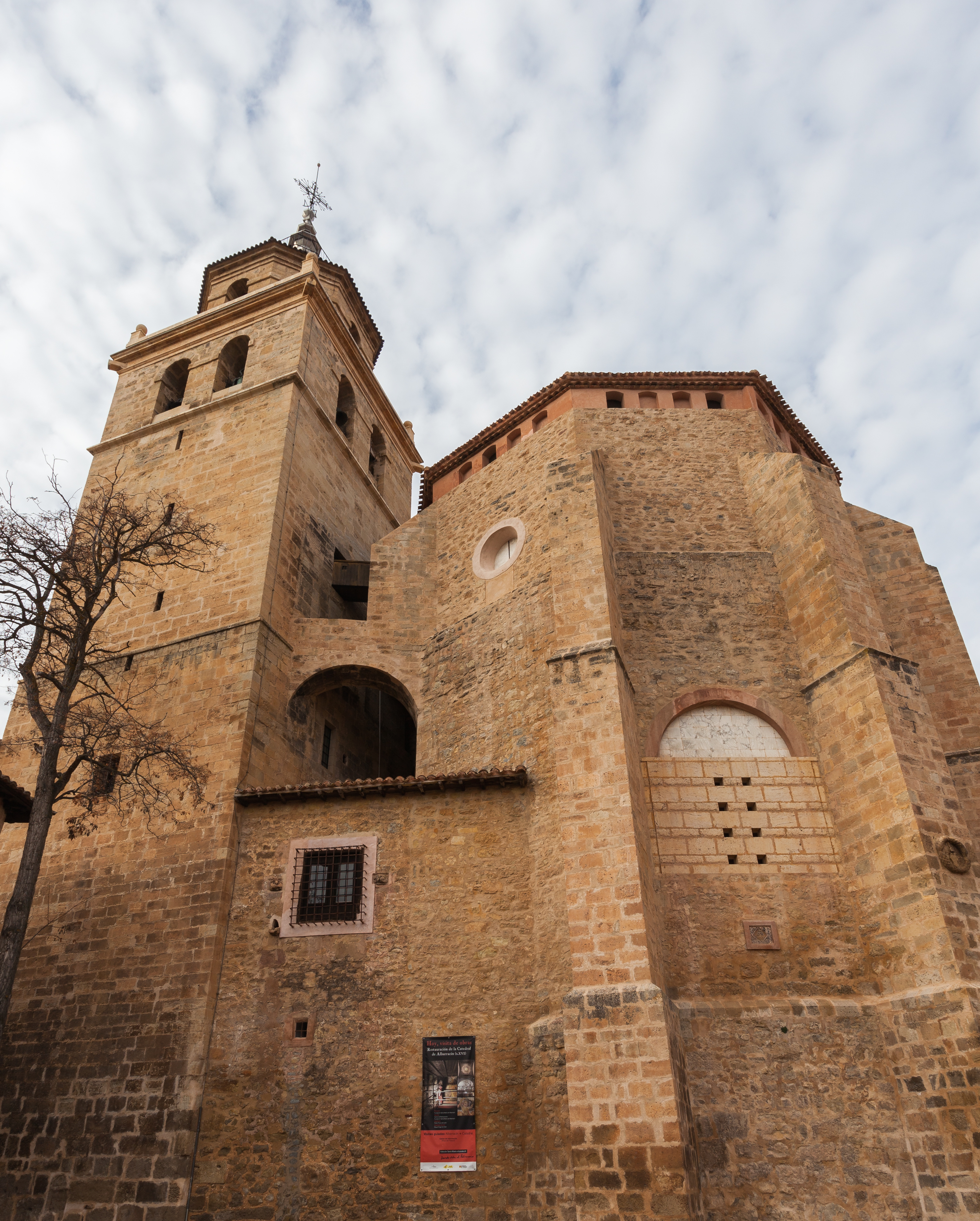
Cathedral.

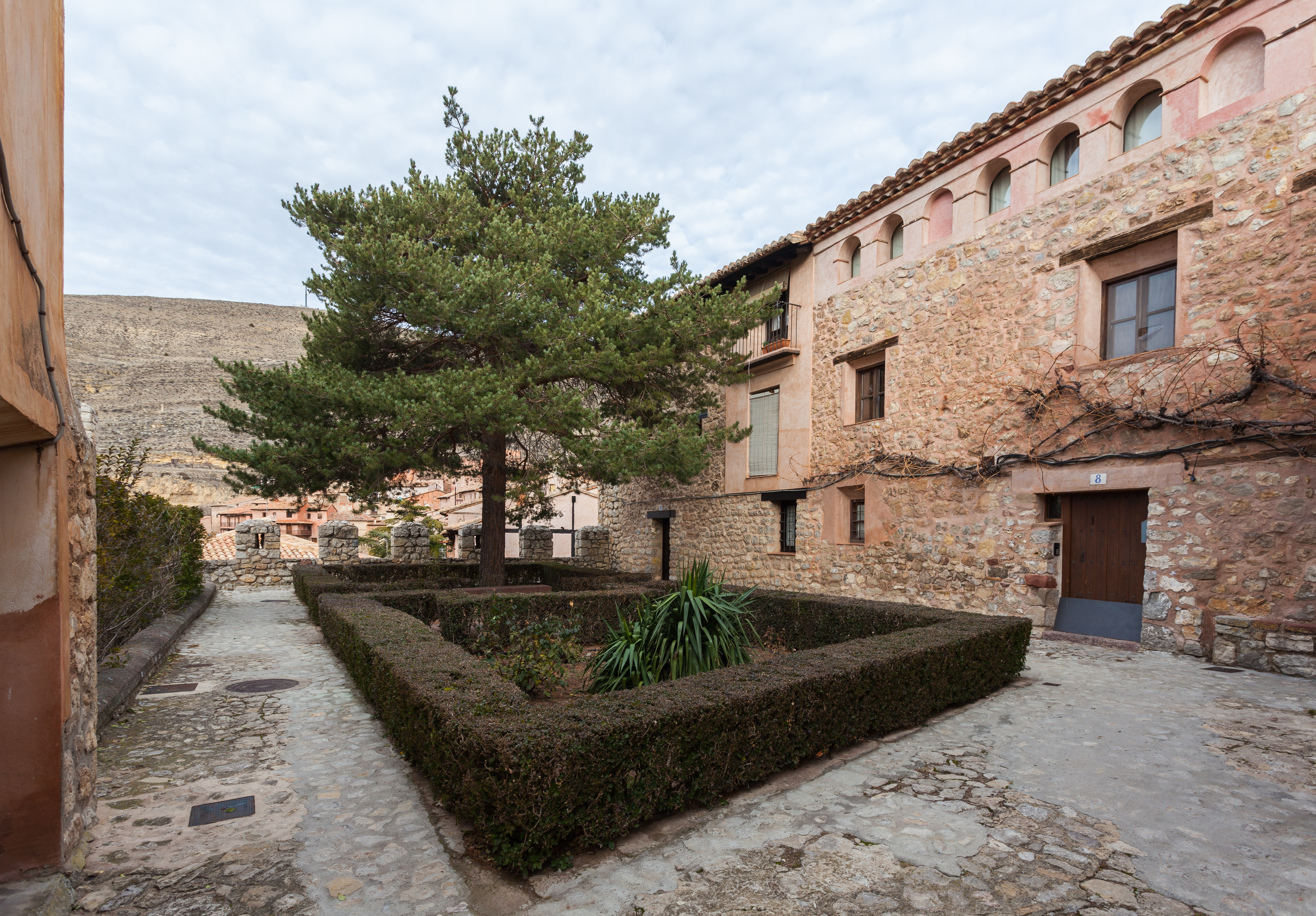
Square in Albarracín.

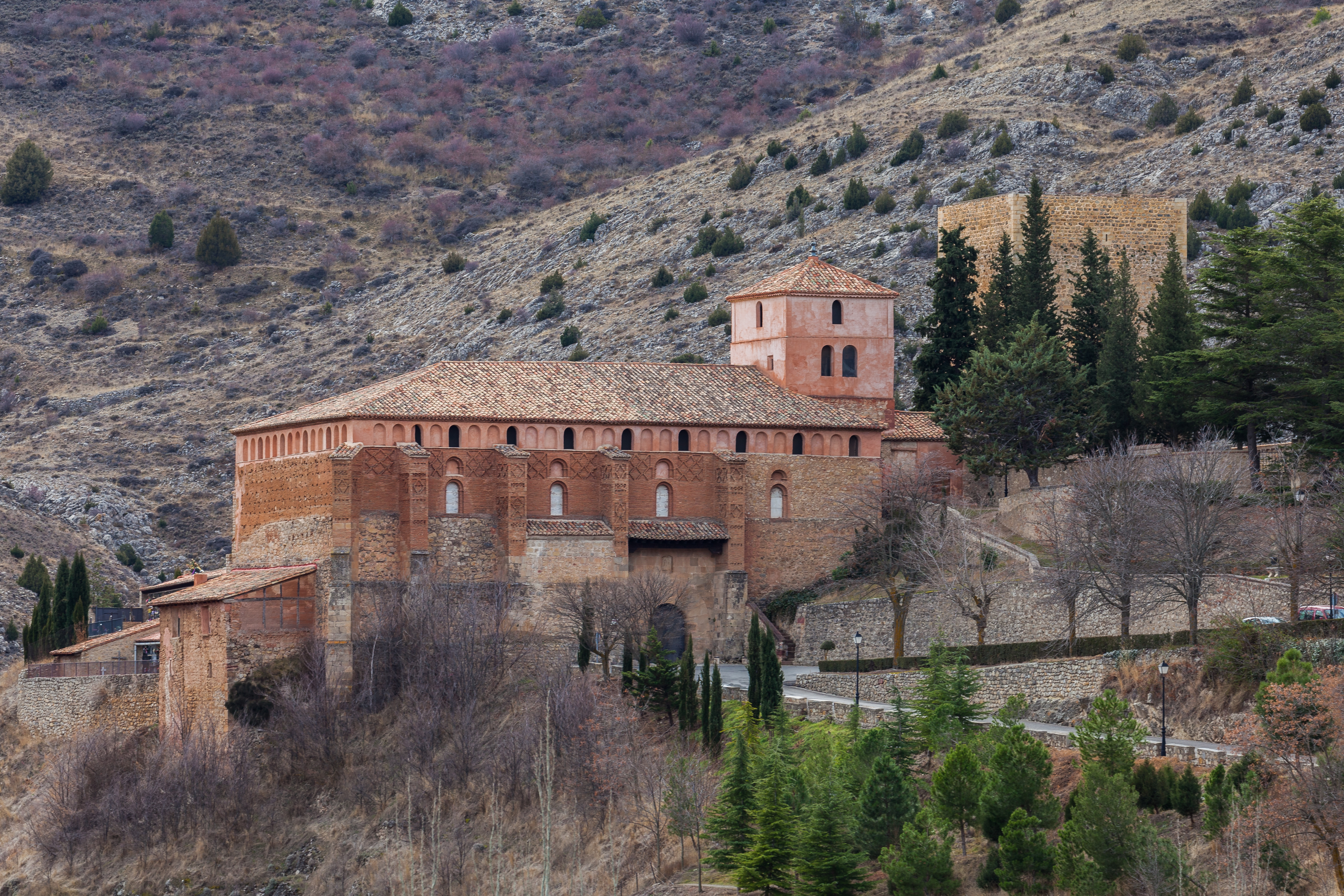
Convento of Discalced Carmelites.

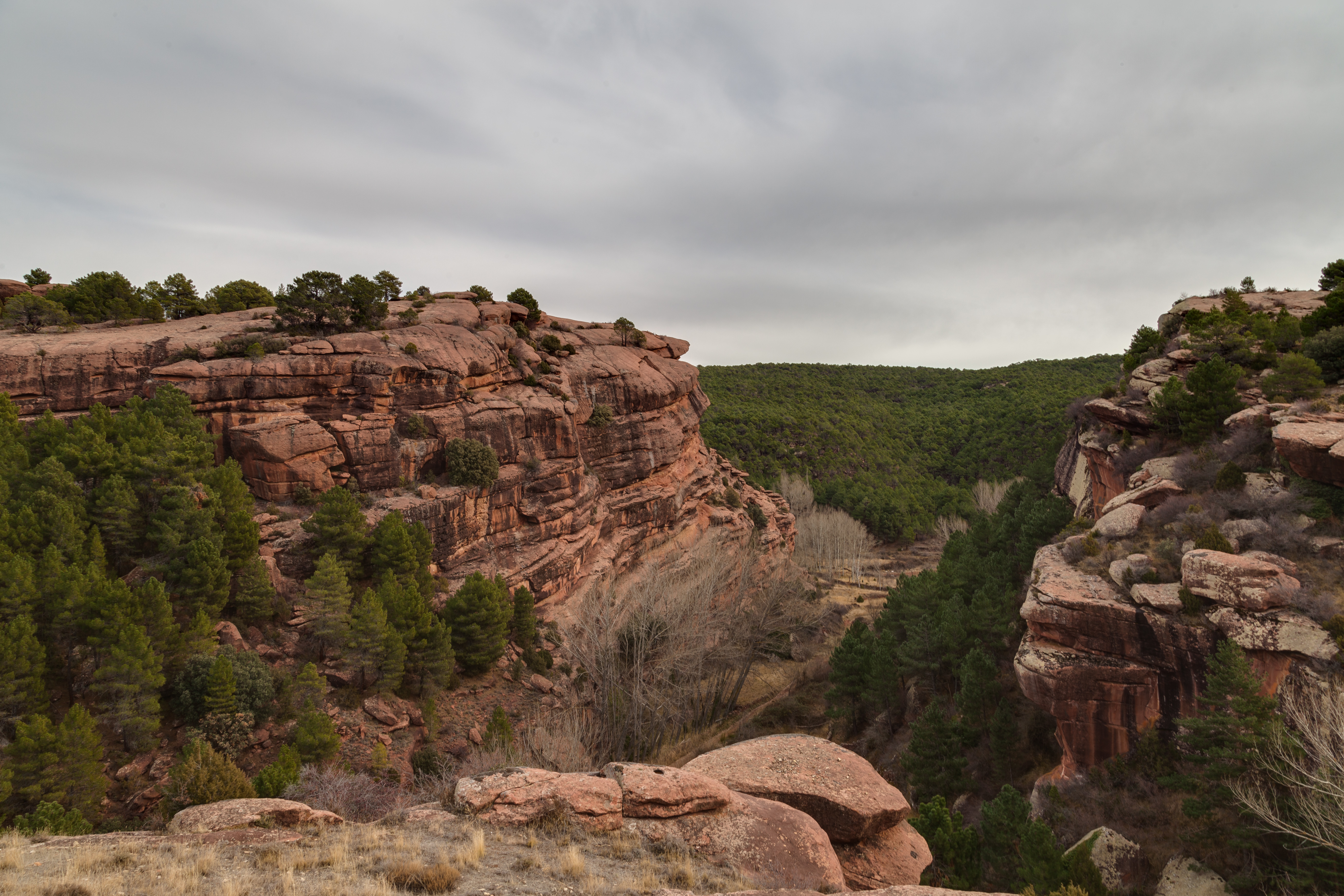
Pinares de Rodeno Forest near Albarracín.
