= Taifa of Albarracín =

Iberian kingdom

Coordinates: 40.4000°N 1.4500°W

- 1012–1104
- Taifa Kingdom of Albarracín, c. 1037.
- Capital: Albarracín
- Common languages: Arabic, Berber, Mozarabic, Hebrew
- Religion: Islam, Roman Catholicism, Judaism
- Government: Monarchy
- Historical era: Middle Ages
  - Downfall of Caliphate of Córdoba: 1012
  - Conquered by the Almoravid dynasty: 1104
- Currency: Dirham and Dinar
Preceded by	Succeeded by
Caliphate of Córdoba	Almoravids; Sinyoría d'Albarrazín

The Taifa of Albarracín (Arabic: طائفة بني رزين) was a medieval Berber taifa kingdom. The polity existed from 1012 to 1104, and was centered at the city of Albarracín. It was led by the Berber dynasty of the Banu Razin tribe, which arrived in the peninsula after the conquest of Spain by Tariq ibn Ziyad.

== Downfall ==
In 1167, under the pressure from the ongoing wars between the Almoravids and the new invasions by the Almohad Caliphate. The Moorish Emir Muhammad ibn Mardanis ceded the Taifa of Albarracín to a vassal of Sancho VI of Navarre, a noble from Estella-Lizarra named Pedro Ruiz de Azagra. The title was granted to d'Azagra due to his support of the Navarrese Crown against Alfonso VIII of Castile and Alfonso I "the Battler" of Aragón.

In 1172, Pero Ruíz d'Azagra managed to consolidate his power over the Señorío making that territory independent of the other Christian kingdoms in the region. In 1190, with the signing of the Borja Accords, between Alfonso II of Aragon and Sancho VI of Navarre, the two monarchs agreed to a defensive pact against Alfonso VIII of Castile which gave official legitimacy to the Sinyoría d'Albarrazín with respect to the two kingdoms.

== List of Emirs ==
=== Banu Razin ===
- Hudayl Djalaf 'Izz ad-Dawla: 1012–1045
- Abu Marwan 'Abd al-Malik: 1045–1103
- Yahya Husam ad-Dawla: 1103–1104

== See also ==
- List of Sunni Muslim dynasties
