= Nuño González de Lara (died 1291) =

Nuño González II de Lara (died 1291) was a Castilian nobleman and military leader of the House of Lara. He was the son of Nuño González I and Teresa Alfonso, illegitimate daughter of King Alfonso IX of León. His brother was Juan Núñez I de Lara.

In June 1268, Nuño visited the tent of Ibn al-Ahmar, emir of Granada, while the latter was in Seville. Ibn al-Ahmar was trying to pry King Alfonso X away from his alliance with the Banu Ashqilula, who were in revolt against the emir. Nuño complained of the injustices and ignominies his family had suffered under Alfonso X, and Ibn al-Ahmar, glad to have gained a Castilian ally, offered to help the Laras obtain justice in exchange for their military assistance against the Banu Ashqilula. He gave Nuño some jewels and told him to inform his father and brother of their agreement. The emir warned him that no action would be immediately forthcoming and to wait for his indication.

In 1272, the Marinid emir of Morocco, Abu Yusuf, invaded Castile. He sent messages to several rebellious nobles, Nuño's father among them, and even requested that the younger Nuño be sent to him in Morocco, where he promised to make him "king" of the Christians, that is, commander of the Christian militia.

== Bibliography ==
- Doubleday, Simon R. (2001). The Lara Family: Crown and Nobility in Medieval Spain. Cambridge, MA: Harvard University Press.
- O'Callaghan, Joseph F. (2011). The Gibraltar Crusade: Castile and the Battle for the Strait. Philadelphia: University of Pennsylvania Press.
