= Nuño González de Lara (died 1275) =

13th-century Castilian nobleman and military leader

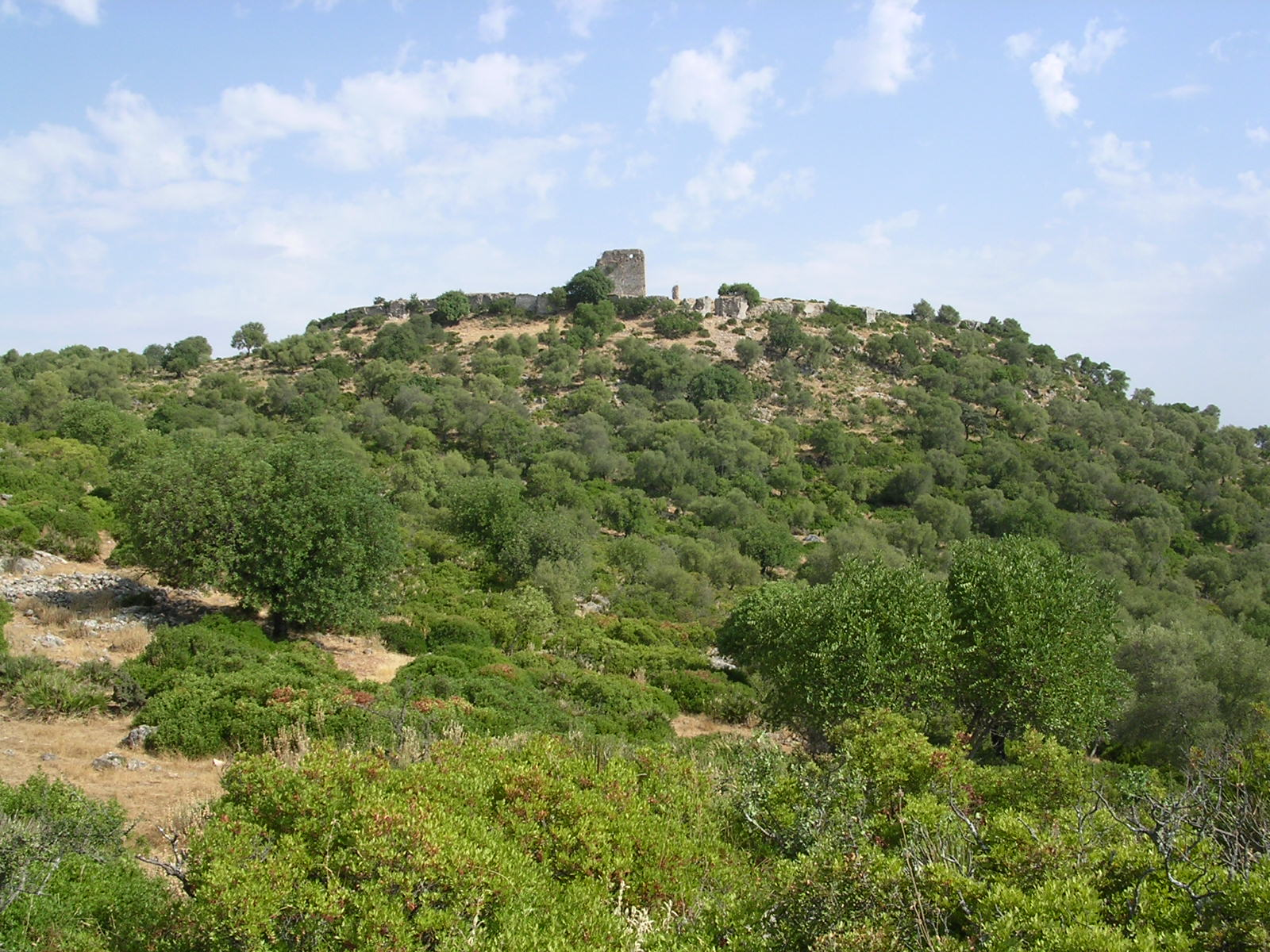
Ruins of the fortress of Matrera, which Nuño captured from rebels in 1263

Nuño González I de Lara (died 8 September 1275), nicknamed el Bueno ("the Good"), was a Castilian nobleman, royal counsellor and military leader. He was the head of the House of Lara and a close personal friend of Alfonso X. The king's policies often stymied his efforts to increase the power and wealth of his house, and in 1272 he led many prominent noblemen into open rebellion. Restored to favour the next year, he died defending the castle of Écija from a Moroccan invasion.

== Early life and family ==
Nuño was the younger son of Gonzalo Núñez II de Lara and María Díaz, daughter of Count Diego López II of the House of Haro. His older brother was Diego González, who died around 1239. Nuño was raised on the Lara estates near Villaldemiro and Celada. He became the closest friend of the future Alfonso X during the prince's childhood (1223–31), when King Ferdinand III sent him to be raised away from the royal court. Nuño did not receive a large inheritance, and had little or no political influence within the kingdom prior to Diego's death. In 1240, Ferdinand III gave Prince Alfonso a house and an income. Nuño was a frequent visitor to the prince's court, along with other childhood friends, like the children of Alfonso's erstwhile guardian, García Fernández de Villamayor.

Nuño rose to prominence as a military commander under King Ferdinand in the 1240s. After Alfonso became king in 1252, Nuño became a regular attendee of the royal court. He was a frequent signatory of royal charters between 1252 and 1256. As an indication of his closeness to the king, he usually signed first after the prelates and members of the royal family, in the highest position possible for a lay non-royal lord. He married Teresa Alfonso, illegitimate daughter of King Alfonso IX of León, and they had two sons: Juan Núñez I and Nuño González II.

== Tenancies and properties ==
In 1255, Nuño led the royal army that defeated Alfonso's rebellious brother Henry near Lebrija, forcing him into exile. Three times he put down Mudéjar rebellions: at Jerez de la Frontera in 1255, at Écija in 1262–63 and at Matrera in 1263. He was granted the relatively safe tenancies of Bureba, La Rioja and Castilla la Vieja in northern Castile, and also the more active tenancies of the fortresses of Écija, Jerez and Seville on the frontier, in areas where Christians Spaniards were only beginning to settle in large numbers.

Given the large number of estates that came into the crown's possession in the mid-thirteenth century, Alfonso X was not particularly generous with Nuño. The nobleman received only one large estate, Corixad Albat, which formed the kernel of the municipality of Herrera. He also received some land at Aznalcázar, some houses in Seville in 1258 and some windmills in Alcalá de Guadaira. This was the extent of royal grants of land he received. He and his wife possessed some windmills at Alcalá acquired by other means and sold them to the Order of Santiago in exchange for a house in San Miguel de Bobadilla in December 1259. During the period when he was tenant of Écija, he bought some bodegas there as well. In all, Nuño's properties seem to have supported a retinue of about 300 knights.

In 1260, Nuño arranged his son Juan's marriage to Teresa Álvarez de Azagra, heiress of the lordship of Albarracín. This was a large, autonomous lordship lying between the Castile, Aragon and Valencia.

== Jerez (1261–64) ==
In the spring or summer of 1261, Alfonso X conquered Jerez. He appointed Nuño as the first Christian alcaide (castellan) of the alcázar (citadel) of Jerez de la Frontera. Nuño appointed the knight García Gómez Carrillo as his commander on the spot. By 1264 the Muslim townspeople had constructed a wall between the town and the citadel. That year, with support from the Marinids of Morocco, they rebelled and attacked the citadel, where Nuño was in command with only a few knights. He immediately appealed to the king at Seville and demanded that he come in person to relieve him. When no help was forthcoming, Nuño abandoned his post, leaving only a small garrison behind. A small relief force from Seville arrived too late. The citadel fell and the garrison was massacred on 8 August.

Nuño was reprimanded for his failure to defend the citadel. Alfonso, in Cantiga 345, refers to Nuño's flight as something that "by law and custom ought not to be". The law in question is found in the Siete Partidas (2, 18), which lists the obligations of an alcaide. Despite the dishonour he had brought upon himself, Nuño was compensated for the loss of revenue from Jerez.

== Slide into rebellion (1267–73) ==
In 1266, the Banu Ashqilula, the most powerful family in the Kingdom of Granada after the ruling Nasrids, and in control of the port of Málaga, approached Alfonso X to ask for an alliance against King Ibn al-Ahmar of Granada. A written agreement was signed wherein Alfonso promised to lead an army in person against Granada if Ibn al-Ahmar attacked the Banu Ashqilula. He also sent Nuño with an army of 1,000 knights to Banu Ashqilula. Nuño perhaps got as far as Málaga, but there is no record of his army doing any fighting. In 1267, the Treaty of Alcalá de Benzaide restored peace between Castile and Granada.

As early as 1267, cracks began to appear in Nuño's relationship with the crown. On 16 February 1267, in the Treaty of Badajoz, Alfonso quitclaimed his usufruct over the Algarve, relinquishing all his claims on it to King Denis of Portugal. In return Portugal relinquished all the Algarve east of the Guadiana to Castile. The original agreement dated to 1253, when Alfonso's daughter Beatrice married Afonso III of Portugal. As part of that agreement, Portugal had renewed payment of tribute—the annual service of fifty knights—to Castile. Nuño, in a meeting of the cortes with King Denis present, had strongly advised Alfonso against relinquishing the tribute. This caused a very public disagreement between Nuño and the king. Ultimately, the king had his way.

In June 1268, as his one-year truce with the Banu Ashqilula was winding down, Ibn al-Ahmar travelled to Seville to confer with Alfonso X. He failed in his attempt to pull Alfonso and the Banu Ashqilula apart, but he did gain a disaffected Castilian nobleman as an ally. Nuño's son and namesake, Nuño II, visited the king of Granada in his tent and complained of the injustices and ignominies his family had suffered under Alfonso X. Ibn al-Ahmar was willing to help the Laras obtain justice in exchange for their military assistance against the Banu Ashqilula. He gave the younger Nuño a gift of jewels and told him to inform his father and brother, Juan Núñez, of their agreement.

In late 1269, Nuño sought to enter the service of King James I of Aragon, who was in Burgos for the wedding of Alfonso X's son, Fernando de la Cerda. He offered James the service of one or two hundred knights, but was only dissuaded by James himself, who was on good terms with Alfonso. Shortly after this, Nuño left for the service of King Henry I of Navarre, with whom the disaffected nobles had been in contact since 1268. He may have been led to abandon Castile by the approval of an extraordinary tax (six servicios) by the cortes held in Burgos in November. By 1272, Nuño he had entered open rebellion in collusion with Castile's enemies, along with a group of high-ranking nobles.

In June 1272, the Marinids invaded Castile from Morocco. Alfonso X ordered a general mobilisation, summoning his noblemen to appear on the frontier under the command of his brother Manuel and son Fernando. The refusal of a great many to appear was the start of the nobles' rebellion. The leaders of the revolt, including Nuño and the king's brother Philip, had been in contact with the Marinid emir, Abu Yusuf, and his son Abd al-Wahid. Eleven letters sent by the Marinid ruler and his son to the rebel leaders were intercepted by the king's men. Before Abu Yusuf the rebels accused Alfonso X of debasing the coinage, violating their customary privileges, causing inflation and favouring merchants. Abu Yusuf encouraged Nuño to send his son Nuño to him in Morocco, where he promised to make the younger Nuño "king" of the Christians, that is, commander of the Christian militia he had raised.

Before the end of 1272, Nuño and several other rebel leaders had paid homage and swore fealty to Ibn al-Ahmar of Granada. Their stated aim was to restore the Treaty of Alcalá de Benzaide and the Portuguese tribute. Despite the clear evidence of treason, the nobles participated in the cortes that convened in Burgos in November. Alfonso granted some concessions, but not enough to satisfy the rebels. Nuño and the other ringleaders determined to go into exile in Granada, but not without plundering the kingdom as they went. Nuño's sons joined him in exile. Upon their arrival in Granada, Ibn al-Ahmar sent the Castilians to plunder the land around Guadix that belonged to the Banu Ashqilula. When Ibn al-Ahmar died on 12 January 1273, there was a dispute over the succession, but the Castilian exiles' support for his son, Abu Abd Allah, secured him the throne.

== Defending Écija (1273–75) ==
In 1273, the new king of Granada and the rebels were quick to open negotiations with Alfonso. In July, Alfonso and the rebels reached an agreement at Seville. The number of servicios was reduced to four and the Fuero real (which gave privileges to the towns) was abolished. In December a truce was agreed with the king of Granada. In March 1274, Nuño, now back in the king of Castile's service, attended the royal court in Burgos. Alfonso granted Nuño the tenancy of Écija, which the 14th-century Crónica de Alfonso X inflated into his being made adelantado mayor de la frontera, the commander-in-chief in charge of the defence of the southern frontier. In fact, the king's illegitimate son Alfonso Fernández el Niño, based in Seville, was given command of the frontier. On account of the truce, however, the frontier was quiet and Nuño and his son Juan even contemplated answering the call of the Second Council of Lyon (18 May 1274) for a new crusade to the Holy Land. A Marinid invasion in May 1275 prevented him from doing so.

After initial campaigns towards Seville and Jaén, Abu Yusuf personally led the main Marinid army against Écija. Although some had advised him to avoid pitched battle, Nuño chose to follow the advice of others, who counselled that a pitched battle was the only way to save his honour. The Moroccan historian Ibn Abi Zar, who calls Nuño "the cursed one", records that he led a massive army with breastplates, chain mail, banners and trumpets. Nuño died in the battle of Écija, probably on Sunday, 8 September 1275, as recorded by Ibn Abi Zar. The only Christian source to date the battle, the Anales Toledanos III, puts it on Saturday, 7 September. According to Ibn Abi Zar, the Marinid emir would have preferred to take Nuño alive. He ordered all the dead Christians beheaded on the field of battle. He could not take Écija, defended by 300 knights, and therefore withdrew. He entered Algeciras in triumph on 18 September, with Nuño's head prominently displayed on a pole. Afterwards, he sent Nuño's head to the king of Granada. Given that Abu Abd Allah owed his throne largely to the intervention of Nuño, whom he knew personally, this was calculated to offend. Out of friendship with Nuño and hatred of the Marinids, Abu Abd Allah had the head embalmed in musk and camphor and sent secretly to Córdoba for burial with the body. His reunited head and body were brought from Córdoba to the convent of San Pablo in Palencia, where they were buried. Nuño's wife, Teresa, was also buried there.

== Sources ==
- Arco y Garay, Ricardo (1954). Sepulcros de la Casa Real de Castilla. Madrid: Instituto Jerónimo Zurita.
- Doubleday, Simon R. (2001). The Lara Family: Crown and Nobility in Medieval Spain. Cambridge, MA: Harvard University Press.
- Escalona, Julio (2002). "Los nobles contra su rey: Argumentos y motivacionesde la insubordinación nobiliaria de 1272–1273". Cahiers de linguistique et de civilisation hispaniques médiévales. 25 (1): 131–62. doi:10.3406/cehm.2002.1234. hdl:10261/43907.
- O'Callaghan, Joseph F. (2011). The Gibraltar Crusade: Castile and the Battle for the Strait. Philadelphia: University of Pennsylvania Press.
- Salvador Martínez, H. (2010). Alfonso X, the Learned: A Biography. Leiden: Brill.
- Sánchez de Mora, Antonio (2003). La nobleza castellana en la plena Edad Media: el linaje de Lara (2 vols.). Doctoral thesis. Universidad de Sevilla.
- Sanchez de Mora, Antonio (2004). "Nuño González de Lara: "El mas poderoso omne que sennor ouiese et mas honrado de Espanna"". Historia, Instituciones, Documentos. 31: 631–44. hdl:11441/22361.
