= House of Lara =

Spanish noble family of Castilian origin

Primitive coat of arms of the House of Lara

The House of Lara (Spanish: Casa de Lara) is a noble family from the medieval Kingdom of Castile. Two of its branches, one of the Dukes of Nájera and one of the Marquises of Aguilar de Campoo were considered Grandees of Spain. The Lara family gained numerous territories in Castile, León, Andalucía, and Galicia and members of the family moved throughout the former Spanish colonies, establishing branches as far away as the Philippines and Argentina.

The House of Lara were most prominent in the history of Castile and León from the 11th to the 14th century. Álvaro Núñez de Lara served as regent for Henry I of Castile. They were dispossessed of much of their land by Peter the Cruel, but most was returned by Henry II.

== History ==
The family arose in 11th century Castile through a marriage that united the paternal lands around Lara de los Infantes belonging to Gonzalo Núñez with the inheritance of his wife, Goto Núñez, representing the holdings of the noble Álvarez and Alfonso families. By the 13th century, the Lara family origin had been linked to the protagonists in the epic Cantar de los Siete Infantes de Lara (Song of the Seven Lara Princes), a 10th-century tale of revenge set around the lands subsequently held by the Lara family, but there is no evidence that the tale reflected historical events and the names in the legend cannot be matched with the family's known ancestry.

From the 12th through 15th centuries, members of the Lara family found themselves at different times either supporting of or opposing their monarch. In 1113, Pedro González de Lara supported Queen Urraca of Castile in her struggles against her former husband, Alfonso I of Aragon. Pedro and his brother, Rodrigo, also confronted her son Alfonso VII in 1130. Rodrigo later helped Alfonso counter the rise of the Almoravids. Manrique Pérez de Lara, Álvar Pérez and Nuño Pérez de Lara disputed the regency of Alfonso VIII, and Fernando Núñez de Lara was Alfonso's alférez. Álvaro Núñez de Lara became regent of Henry I. Nuño González de Lara served Ferdinand III and Alfonso X, but in 1270 led an alliance of nobles against the same king. Juan Núñez I de Lara el Gordo, Señor de Albarracín, opposed the enthronement of Sancho IV, and had to temporarily flee to France. Juan Núñez II de Lara headed various rebellions against Alfonso XI. Ultimately, the family suffered greatly after the victory of King Peter against his usurping half-brother, Henry II.

== The Manrique de Lara ==
Coat of arms of Manrique de Lara

The only branch of the family to survive the Middle Ages were the Manrique de Lara, who supported the Catholic Monarchs in their war against the supporters of the contender Joanna la Beltraneja, Queen consort of Portugal and former Princess of Asturias.

In 1520, Emperor Charles V raised this collateral line of the House of Lara to the position of Grandee, as Dukes of Nájera and Marquises of Aguilar de Campoo. Members of the family were to serve the crown as viceroys, captain generals, ambassadors and cardinals. María Luisa Manrique de Lara y Gonzaga, Vicereine of New Spain and patron of Juana Inés de la Cruz, matrilineally descends from this branch of the family.

The first Count of Paredes de Nava became Master of the Order of Santiago. The authors Gómez Manrique and Jorge Manrique belong to this branch of the Lara.

The original coat of arms is supposed to represent two cauldrons, which represent the ability of the family to sustain many followers.

== Family tree ==
Lara family tree

Gonzalo perhaps son of García Fernández of Castile	Gutierre; Alfonso
Salvador González	Munio; González	Nuño; Álvarez	María; Gutiérrez
HOUSE OF LARA	JIMÉNEZ; DYNASTY (CASTILE–LEÓN)
Gonzalo; Salvadórez	Álvar; Salvadórez	Armando Núñez de Lara	Goto; Núñez	Constance of Burgundy	Alfonso VI; King of León and Castile	Isabel (= Zaida of Seville?)
COUNTS OF; BUREBA
Iñigo Jiménez de los Cameros	María González de Lara	Goto González de Lara	Teresa González de Lara	Stephanie Armengol of Urgell	Rodrigo González de Lara	Sancha of León/Castile
VISCOUNTS OF; NARBONNE	HOUSE OF; IVREA (CASTILE–LEÓN)
Aimeric II; Viscount of Narbonne	García; Ordóñez	Eva	Pedro González de Lara	Urraca; Queen of León and Castile	Raymond of Burgundy	Teresa; Countess of Portugal	Pedro Rodriguez de Lara (no known issue)
Ermengol VI of Urgell	Elvira Rodriguez de Lara	Sancha Rodriguez de Lara (no known issue)
Alfonso VII; King of León and Castile	Fernán Pérez "Furtado" (issue disputed)
Hermesenda of Narbonne	Manrique Pérez de Lara	Álvar Pérez de Lara (no known issue)	García Pérez de Traba	Elvira Pérez de Lara	Beltrán de Risnel
Milia Pérez de Lara	Gómez González de Manzanedo	Ferdinand II; King of León	Teresa; Fernández de Traba	Nuño Pérez de Lara
Pedro Manrique de Lara; Viscount of Narbonne	Aimeric Manrique de Lara; Duke of Narbonne (no known issue)	Diego López IIf de Haro	María Manrique de Lara
Gonzalo Pérez I Manrique de Lara	Aimeric IIII; Viscount ofI; Narbonne	Ermengol VIII of Urgell	Elvira Núñez I de Lara	Álvaro Núñez I de Lara
María Díaz I de Haro	Gonzalo Núñez de Lara	Fernando Núñez de Lara	Sancho, Count of Provence	Sancha Núñez I de Lara
VISCOUNTS OF NARBONNE
Alfonso IX; King of León	Fernando Álvarez de Lara	Gonzalo Álvarez de Lara	Nuño Álvarez de Lara	Rodrigo Álvarez de Lara
HOUSE OF; BURGUNDY (PORTUGAL)
Mafalda González; Manrique de Lara	Alfonso of Molina	Teresa González de Lara	Diego González de Lara (no known issue)	Nuño Fernández de Lara	Fernán Rodriguez de Lara	Sancha Rodriguez de Lara	Afonso II; King of Portugal
Teresa Alfonso	Nuño González de Lara 'the Good'	Rodrigo Fernández de Castro	Leonor González de Lara	María Alfonso	Álvar Fernández de Lara	Fernando Fernández de Lara (no known issue)	Sancha Fernández de Lara	Fernando; Lord of Serpa
Ferdinand III; King of León and Castile	Teresa Fernández de Lara	Ponç IV of Empúries
Álvaro Núñez de Lara (no known issue)	Nuño González de Lara (no known issue)	Teresa Alvárez de Lara	Diego López de Salcedo
Teresa Álvarez de Azagra	Juan Núñez de Lara 'the Fat'	Teresa Díaz II de Haro	Alfonso X, King of Castile
John of Castile	Ferdinand de la Cerda
Sancho IV; King of Castile
Álvaro Núñez de Lara (no known issue)	Juan Núñez de Lara 'the Younger' (no known issue)	Nuño González de Lara (no known issue)	Teresa Núñez de Lara	Alfonso of Castile	Ferdinand de la Cerda	Juana Núñez de Lara	Henry of Castile
Ferdinand IV; King of Castile
Juan de Castilla y Haro
HOUSE OF; BARCELONA (Aragon)
Alfonso XI; King of Castile	María Díaz de Haro heiress of Biscay	Juan Núñez de Lara	Alfonso IV; King of Aragon
Tello Alfonso of Castile	Juana de Lara; Lady of Lara (no known issue)	Lope Díaz de Haro (no known issue)	Nuno Díaz de Haro; Lord of Lara (no known issue)	Isabel de Lara; Lady of Lara (no known issue)	Juan of Aragon

style="border-spacing: 2px; border: 1px solid darkgray;"

Members of the House of Lara in the male line
Marriage or extramarital relationship
Descent
Extra-marital Descent

== Bibliography ==
- Doubleday, Simon R. (2004). Los Lara. Nobleza y monarquía en la España Medieval (in Spanish). Madrid: Turner Publicaciones, S.L. y C.S.I.C. ISBN 84-7506-650-X.
- Estepa Díez, Carlos (2007). "Castilla de Condado a Reino". Alfonso VI y su época I. Los precedentes del reinado (966-1065) (in Spanish). E. Fernández González and J. Pérez Gil (Coord.). León: Universidad de León. Secretariado de Publicaciones. pp. 37–67. ISBN 978-84-9773-339-7.
- Estepa Díez, Carlos (2006). "Frontera, nobleza y señoríos en Castilla: el señorío de Molina (siglos XII-XIII)". Studia histórica. Historia medieval. No. 24. Salamanca: Ediciones Universidad de Salamanca. pp. 15–86. ISSN 0213-2060.
- Martínez Díez, Gonzalo (1997). El Monasterio de Fresdelval, el Castillo de Sotopalacios y la Merindad y Valle de Ubierna. Burgos: Caja de Burgos, Área de Cultura. ISBN 84-87152-39-2.
- Menéndez Pidal de Navascués, Faustino (1984). "Los sellos de los señores de Molina". Anuario de Estudios Medievales. No. 14. pp. 101–120. ISSN 0066-5061.
- Salazar y Castro, Luis de (1696). Historia Genealógica de la Casa de Lara (in Spanish). Vol. I. Madrid: Mateo Llanos y Guzmán.
- Salazar y Castro, Luis de (1697a). Historia Genealógica de la Casa de Lara (in Spanish). Vol. II. Madrid: Mateo Llanos y Guzmán.
- Salazar y Castro, Luis de (1697b). Historia Genealógica de la Casa de Lara (in Spanish). Vol. III. Madrid: Mateo Llanos y Guzmán.
- Salazar y Castro, Luis de (1694). Pruebas de la historia de la casa de Lara (in Spanish). Madrid: Mateo Llanos y Guzmán. OCLC 48730039.
- Sánchez de Mora, Antonio (1998). "Aproximación al estudio de la nobleza castellana: Los llamados Salvadores-Manzanedo y sus relaciones con el linaje de Lara (ss.XI-XIII)". Medievalismo: Boletín de la Sociedad Española de Estudios Medievales (in Spanish). No. 8. pp. 35–64. ISSN 1131-8155.
