= Álvaro Núñez (footballer, born 1973) =

Uruguayan footballer

Personal information
- Full name: Álvaro Adrián Núñez Moreira
- Date of birth: 11 May 1973 (age 53)
- Place of birth: Rivera, Uruguay
- Height: 1.85 m (6 ft 1 in)
- Position: Goalkeeper

Senior career*
Years	Team	Apps	(Gls)
1993	Fénix		
1994–1995	Cerro		
1996–1999	Rentistas	54	(0)
1999–2008	Numancia	136	(0)
2008–2011	Guadalajara	65	(0)
Total		255	(0)

International career
1999	Uruguay	1	(0)
- * Club domestic league appearances and goals

Álvaro Adrián Núñez Moreira (born 11 May 1973) is a Uruguayan retired footballer who played as a goalkeeper.

He also has a Spanish passport, having spent over a decade playing in the country mainly with Numancia (eight years, 83 La Liga games).

== Club career ==
Núñez was born in Rivera. After playing in his country with Centro Atlético Fénix, C.A. Cerro and C.A. Rentistas, he moved to Spain in 1999, signing with CD Numancia. An undisputed starter in his first two seasons (both in La Liga, playing a combined 72 games) he started struggling for a starting XI berth onwards, and was majorly a backup in the rest of his Soria career, which was almost entirely spent in the second division.

After nine matches in 2007–08, as Numancia returned to the top flight after three years, Núñez left the club but stayed in the country, joining lowly CD Guadalajara. He retired in June 2011, at the age of 38.

== International career ==
Núñez won one cap for Uruguay, and was a backup at the 1999 Copa América.

== Honours ==
=== Club ===
==== Numancia ====
- Segunda División: 2007–08

=== International ===
==== Uruguay ====
- Copa América: Runner-up 1999
