= Battle of Écija (1275) =

Battle in 1275 in Spain

- Part of the Reconquista
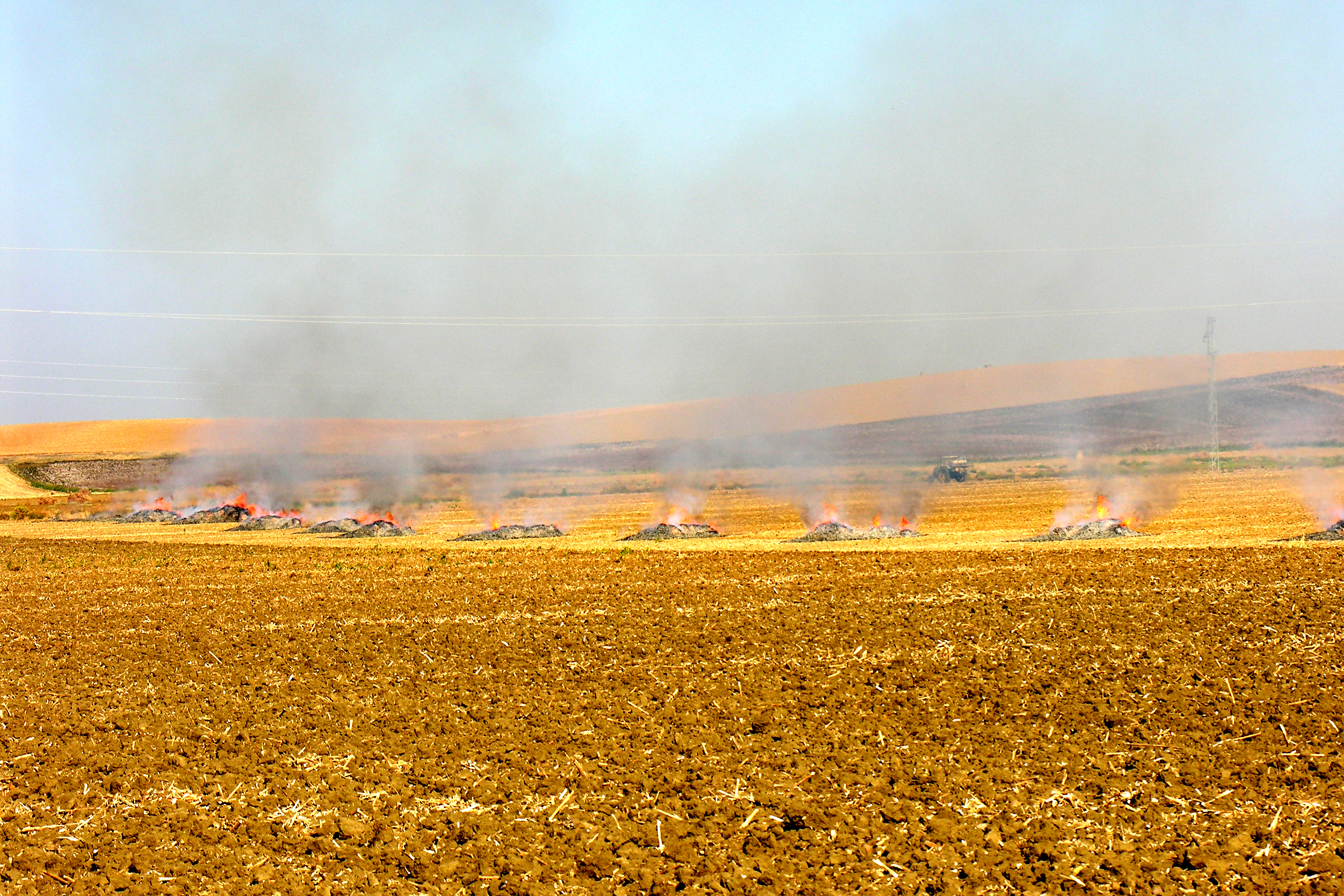
- Farmland near Écija near the spot where Nuño González de Lara was killed and decapitated.
Date	September 8, 1275
Location	Écija, Emirate of Granada (present-day Spain) 37°32′N 5°05′W
Result	Marinid victory

Belligerents
Kingdom of Castile	Marinid Sultanate; Emirate of Granada

Commanders and leaders
Nuño González de Lara "el Bueno" †	Abu Yusuf Yaqub ibn Abd Al-Haqq

Casualties and losses
	Unknown
- Location within Province of Seville Battle of Écija (1275) (Spain)

The Battle of Écija (Arabic: معركة الدونونية) was a battle of the Spanish Reconquista that took place on 8 September 1275. The battle pitted the Muslim troops of the Marinids and its allies against those of the Kingdom of Castile and resulted in a Marinid victory.

== Background ==
The Nasrid Emirate of Granada was engulfed in a civil war and was regularly devastated by Castilian forces who saw an opportunity for easy plunder due to the distraction of the Muslim forces. Muhammad II asked for help from his Moroccan allies to ease the difficulty of fighting two wars at once. The Sultan, the Marinid Abu Yusuf Yaqub ibn Abd Al-Haqq, landed on the Iberian Peninsula in 1275 with an army and began a campaign with the strategic objective to occupy the city of Tarifa. The Castilian King, Alfonso X of Castile was abroad at the time and the country was ruled by his son, infante Ferdinand acting as regent. He immediately raised some troops and moved south but unexpectedly died of natural causes in Villa Real on 25 July 1275. Ferdinand's death at a crucial time of invasion not only opened the question of succession but also left the defence of the realm in disarray.

Abu Yusuf persuaded the king of Granada and the Banu Ashqilula to put aside their differences and join war against "the polytheists", upon which the Marinids then ravaged Guadalquivir valley while the Granadan forces pillaged the kingdom of Jaen. News of the Marinid invasion led the Mudéjars of Murcia and Valencia to try to shake of Christian rule.

== Battle ==
On September 8, while marching north, the Muslim forces encountered a Castilian army under the command of Nuño González de Lara "el Bueno", adelantado mayor de Andalucia and castellan of Écija. Though some had advised him to avoid a pitched battle, he had decided to halt the Marinid approach. The Marinid forces routed the Castilian army and Nuño González de Lara was killed in the action or shortly thereafter.

== Aftermath ==
According to Ibn Abi Zar, 18,000 Christian soldiers but only 32 Muslims were slain, but this is considered a grotesque exaggeration. Abu Yusuf was, however, not able to take the Écija as 300 Christian knights were able to enter the town and compelled him to withdraw. The Marinid Sultan ordered that Nuño González' head be cut off, sending it as a trophy to the Sultan of Granada, Muhammad II. The latter, who had either been on friendly terms with Nuño González or at least respected, sent the head to be interred with his body in Cordoba.

In October, a second army led by Archbishop Sancho of Toledo met a similar defeat in the battle of Martos. The kingdom in the end was saved by the infante Sancho of Castile who rallied the Castilian forces. A defeat of the Moorish fleet by a Castilian force at Tarifa threatened to cut communication with Morocco, which led Abu Yusuf to hasten his return to Morocco and in late December or early January 1276 the Castile, Granada and the Marinids signed a truce for two years.

== Sources ==
- O'Callaghan, Joseph F. (17 March 2011). The Gibraltar Crusade: Castile and the Battle for the Strait. University of Pennsylvania Press. ISBN 978-0-8122-0463-6.

3. ^ Ibn Abi Zar’ ( 1320 ). Rawd Al Qirtaas ~ Pg 300. Darul Mansur 1972 Edition.
