= Celada =

Celada is a surname. Notable people with the surname include:

- Andrian Celada (born 1987), Filipino basketball player
- Carlo Celada, Italian gymnast

== See also ==
- La Celada, a village in Córdoba, Spain
- Celadas, a municipality in Teruel, Aragon, Spain
- Celada, Gurabo, Puerto Rico, a barrio in the municipality of Gurabo in Puerto Rico
