= Vide e Cabeça =

- Civil parish
- Location in Portugal
- Coordinates: 40.296°N 7.784°W
- Country: Portugal
- Region: Centro
- Intermunic. comm.: Beiras e Serra da Estrela
- District: Guarda
- Municipality: Seia

Area
  - Total: 56.47 km^{2} (21.80 sq mi)

Population (2011)
  - Total: 761
  - Density: 13/km^{2} (35/sq mi)
- Time zone: UTC+00:00 (WET)
  - Summer (DST): UTC+01:00 (WEST)

Vide e Cabeça is a civil parish in the municipality of Seia, Portugal. It was formed in 2013 by the merger of the former parishes Vide and Cabeça. The population in 2011 was 761, in an area of 56.47 km^{2}.
