= Lordship of Albarracín =

Coordinates: 40°24′30″N 1°26′22″W

Lordship of Albarracín Sinyoría d'Albarrazín (in Aragonese) Senyoria d'Albarrasí (in Catalan) Señorío de Albarracín (in Spanish)
- 1167–1300
- Capital: Albarracín
- Common languages: Navarro-Aragonès, Mozarabic, Arabic
- Religion: Roman Catholic; Islam
- Government: Independent Lordship
- Lord
  - 1167: Pero Ruiz d'Azagra (first)
  - c. 1220: Pedro Fernández de Azagra
- Historical era: Middle Ages
  - Established: 1167
  - Disestablished: 1300
Preceded by
Taifa of Albarracín; Almoravid dynasty
- Today part of: Albarracín, Spain

The Lordship of Albarracín was an independent Christian lordship in the Kingdom of Aragón located in and around the city of Albarracín. Its location was a buffer wedged between the Kingdom of Aragón and the Kingdom of Castile. The Señorío was created after the partition of the Taifa of Albarracín belonging to the Berber line of Banu Razín.

== History ==
=== Establishment ===
In 1167, under the pressure from the ongoing wars between the Almoravid Dynasty and the new invasions of the Almohad Caliphate, the Moorish King Muhammad ibn Mardanis (nicknamed the Wolf King), ceded the Taifa of Albarracín to a vassal of Sancho VI of Navarre, a noble from Estella-Lizarra named Pedro Ruiz de Azagra. The title was granted to d'Azagra due to his support of the Navarrese Crown against Alfonso VIII of Castile and Alfonso I of Aragón (Alfonso the Battler).

In 1172, Pero Ruíz d'Azagra managed to consolidate his power over the Señorío making that territory independent of the other Christian Kingdoms in the region. In 1190, with the signing of the Borja Accords, between Alfonso II of Aragon and Sancho VI of Navarre, the two monarchs agreed to a defensive pact against Alfonso VIII of Castile which gave official legitimacy to the Sinyoría d'Albarrazín with respect to the two kingdoms.

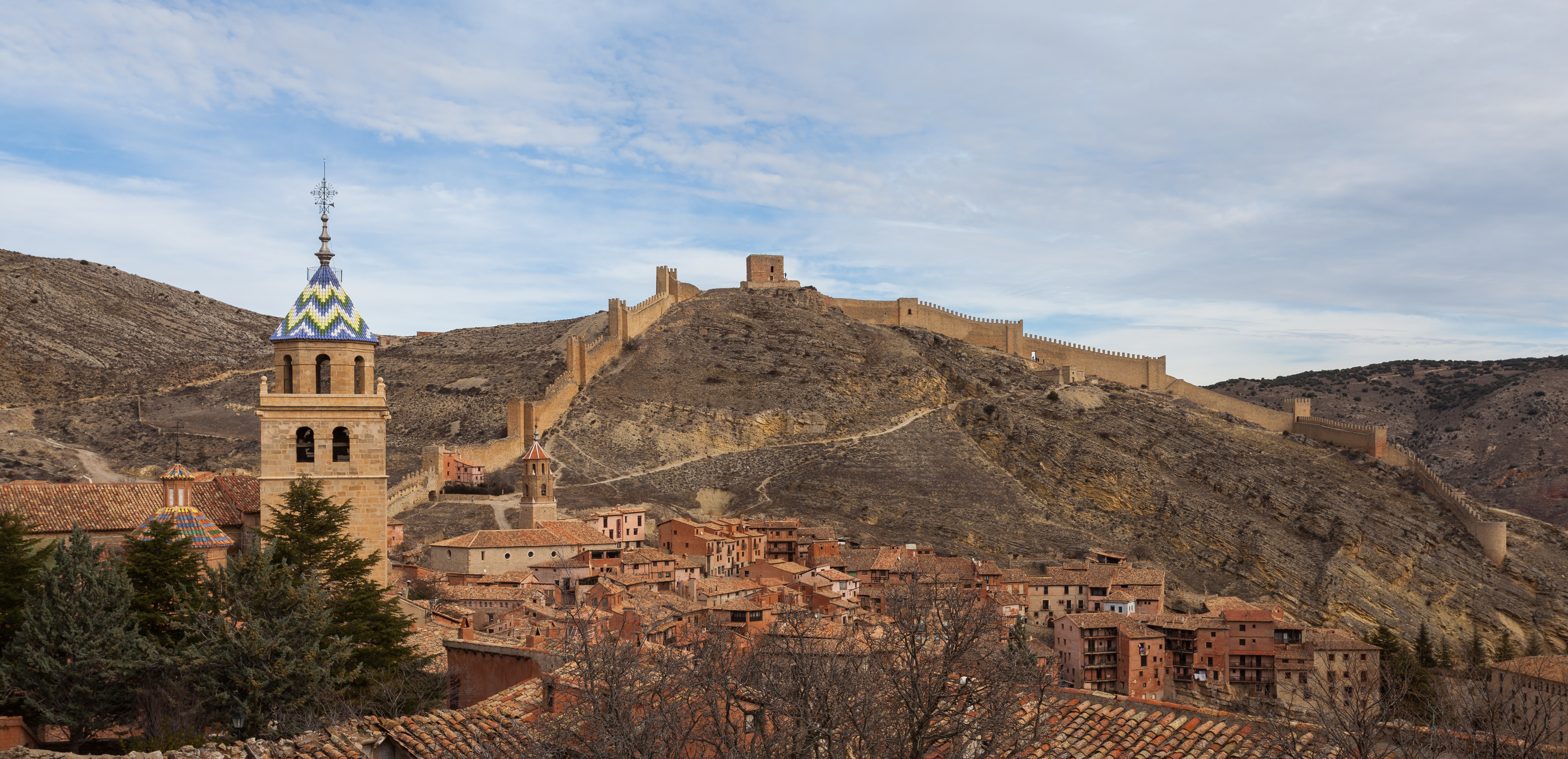
Albarracín, the tower of the Albarracín Cathedral and Northern walls (with Torre del Andador on the top)

=== Troubles with the Kingdom of Aragón ===
In 1220, Albarracín became one of the scenes of the First Noble Revolt Against James I of Aragón. This revolt was fostered by Rodrigo de Lizana with the help of Pedro Fernández de Azagra, the contemporary Señor of Albarracín. James I of Aragón decided to besiege the city that same year but lifted the siege after he failed to gain significant support from his nobility.

=== Conquest of the Taifa of Valencia ===
The House of Azagra remained out of favor with the Crown of Aragón until the Reconquista of Valencia, during which they collaborated with the Aragonese Crown. In 1233, they participated in the conquest of Valencia. One of the major battles the Señorío contributed its forces to was the Siege of Burriana which resulted in a victory for Aragon over the Zayyan ibn Mardanish and the Taifa of Valencia.

=== Downfall and integration into the Kingdom of Aragón ===
The House of Azagra remained dominant in the region for six generations thanks to the support received from the Kingdom of Aragon. In 1281, with the signing of the Treaty of d'Ágreda by Peter III of Aragon and Alfonso X of Castile came to an agreement and Aragon was free to pursue territorial expansion in the region of Albarrazín and elsewhere. In 1284, the Sinyoría d'Albarrazín was conquered by the Kingdom of Aragon after a lengthy siege lasting from April to September of that year. Attempts to recover the lands by the contemporary lord, Juan Núñez I de Lara, who decided to pursue an alliance with the Kingdom of France, were defeated. Peter III of Aragon, upon capturing the city, gave it as a gift to his illegitimate child with Inés Zapata, Ferdinand of Aragon.

In 1300, James II of Aragon incorporated the lands and city of Albarracín into his dominion as a titled city.

=== The Lords of Albarrasí ===
Señor de Albarracín	Period	AKA
--
Pero Ruíz d'Azagra (Aragonese)	1167 - 1186	Pero Ruíz d'Açagra (in Catalan); Pedro Ruíz de Azagra (in Spanish)
Fernando Ruíz d'Azagra (Aragonese)	1186 - 1196	Ferrando Ruiz d'Açagra (in Catalan); Fernando Ruíz de Azagra (in Spanish)
Pero Ferrández d'Azagra (Aragonese)	1196 - 1246	Pero Ferrández d'Açagra (in Catalan); Pedro Fernández de Azagra (in Spanish)
Alvar Pérez d'Azagra (Aragonese)	1246 - 1260	Alvar Pérez d'Açagra (in Catalan); Alvaro Pérez de Azagra (in Spanish)
Joan I Nunyez de Lara (Aragonese)	1260 - 1294	Joan I Nunyez de Lara (in Catalan); Juan Núñez I de Lara (in Spanish)
Joan II Nunyez de Lara (Aragonese)	1294 - 1300	Joan II Nunyez de Lara (in Catalan); Juan Núñez II de Lara (in Spanish)
