= Juan Núñez II de Lara =

Spanish noble (1276-1315)

Primitive coat of arms of the House of Lara.

Juan Núñez II de Lara (c. 1276 – 1315), nicknamed el Mozo or el de la Barba (the bearded one), was a Spanish noble, and head of the House of Lara in the service of the Kingdom of Castile.

Amongst other titles, he was the Mayordomo Mayor del Rey four times and was the Adelantado Mayor de la Frontera de Andalucía. He was also the nominal title holder over the Sinyoría d'Albarrazín though it was incorporated into the crown of the Kingdom of Aragon in 1300.

== Family origins ==
Juan's parents were Juan Núñez I de Lara (d. 1294), head of the House of Lara, and Teresa de Haro, daughter of Diego López III de Haro, the seventh Lord of Biscay and of Constanza de Bearne. Teresa was the sister of Lope Díaz III de Haro and of Diego López V de Haro, both Lords of Biscay.

== Biography ==
In the chronicles of the king, Sancho IV of Castile, one anecdote is dedicated to this Juan Nunez where the monarch entrusts Juan with the care of his son, infante Ferdinand.

Don Juan Nuñez, bien sabedes commo llegastes hasta mi mozo sin barbas, é fice vos mucha merced, lo uno en casamiento que vos dí muy bueno, é lo otro en cuantía, e ruego vos que pues yo so tan mal andante commo vos vedes, que si yo muriere, que nunca vos desamparedes al infante don Fernando, mi fijo, fasta que el hay a barbas é otrosí, que sirvades a la reina en toda su vida ça mucho vos lo meresció á vos é á vuestro linaje.

According to Carlos Estepa Díez, this text reveals that between infancy and coming of age, it can be deduced that Juan Nunez II was brought for the first time before King Sancho IV (c. 1288), when he would have been around 12 to 14 years of age.

In 1290, after a confrontation that his father had with the king, the queen, María de Molina proposed as a solution, the marriage of Juan Nunuez I's son with Isabel Alfonso de Molina, daughter of Blanca Alfonso de Molina, half sister of the queen and wife of Alfonso Fernández de Castilla el Niño, the illegitimate son of King Alfonso X of Castile.

Throughout his life, Juan Nunez fought against and allied himself with both Diego López V de Haro and John of Castile in a strategic power struggle for land and influence over king Ferdinand IV. This lifelong fight culminated in the loss of most of Juan Nunez' lands and territories at the hands of the king when he surrendered to royal forces after a protracted siege of his town at Tordehumos.

Lara managed to eventually regain his status and some of his titles after his participation and distinction in Ferdinand IV's invasion of Granada. While the expedition eventually ended in failure, Lara had several exploits, including the taking of the town of Gibraltar from Moorish forces. He also participated in the disastrous Siege of Algeciras of 1309 and retreated with the army in 1310. Lara was one of the few followers of the king who did not desert his service during the war.

According to the chronicles of the King Alfonso XI of Castile, Juan Nunez II de Lara died in 1315 during the Courts of Burgos.

E fizo su testamento, e por que no avie fijo heredero nin fija que heredase después de su muerte, mandó para su alma a Lara que era suya e quanto en el mundo avia. E los fijos dalgo de Castilla acordaron que la casa honrrada de Lara que no era bien que quedase sin señor, porque antiguamente fue un solar de los tres de Castilla; e con otorgamiento del rrey y de los sus tutores y de todos los otros en general, dieron señor heredero a la casa de Lara, e este fue don Joan Nuñez, sobrino desde don Joan Nuñez de la Barba que fino, hijo de Joana su hermana e de don Fernando que llamavan de la Çerda (...)

== Marriage and legacy ==
In 1290 Juan married for the first time with Isabel Alfonso de Molina, who died in 1292. She was the daughter of Alfonso Fernández de Castilla el Niño, the illegitimate son of King Alfonso X of Castile, and of Blanca Alfonso de Molina, Señora of Molina and Mesa. This marriage produced no offspring.

In 1295, he married María Díaz de Haro, daughter of the infante John of Castile and his wife, María I Díaz de Haro. The couple had no children.

In 1300, he married a third time with María Díaz III de Haro, daughter of Diego López V de Haro, Lord of Biscay, and his wife, the infanta Violante de Castilla y Aragón. Without succession.

Without descendants from any of his three marriages, coupled with his brother, Álvaro Núñez de Lara dying in 1287, when he died he ceded all his titles to his sister, Juana Núñez de Lara. She was married with the infante Ferdinand de la Cerda, grandson of Alfonso X of Castile

Preceded by Juan Núñez I de Lara	Head of House Lara; 1294–1315	Succeeded by Juana Núñez de Lara
Preceded by Juan Osórez	Adelantado mayor de la frontera de Andalucía; 1307–1309	Succeeded by Sancho Sánchez de Velasco
Preceded by Juan Osórez	Mayordomo Mayor of the King; June 1302–July 1302	Succeeded by Henry of Castile
Preceded by Pedro Ponce de León y Meneses	Mayordomo Mayor of the King; April 1307–August 1307	Succeeded by Diego López V de Haro
Preceded by Diego López V de Haro	Mayordomo Mayor of the King; 1308–?	Succeeded by Pedro de Castilla y Molina
Preceded by Don Juan Manuel	Mayordomo Mayor of the King; August 1315–September 1315	Succeeded by Alfonso de Valencia

== Bibliography ==
- Estepa Díez, Carlos (2006). "Doña Juana Núñez y el señorío de los Lara, Revue interdisciplinaire d'études hispaniques médiévales". E-Spania. Revue Interdisciplinaire d'Études Hispaniques Médiévales et Modernes (1). París: SEMH-Sorbonne. doi:10.4000/e-spania.315. hdl:10261/15148. S2CID 162303549.
- Masnata y de Quesada, David E. (1985). La Casa Real de la Cerda, Estudios Genealógicos y Heráldicos. Madrid: Asociación Española de Estudios Genealógicos y Heráldicos. pp. 169–229. ISBN 84-398-3591-4.
- de Salazar y Acha, Jaime (2000). La casa del Rey de Castilla y León en la Edad Media (1ª ed.). Madrid: Centro de Estudios Políticos y Constitucionales. ISBN 84-259-1128-1.
