= Luis de Salazar y Castro =

Spanish genealogist

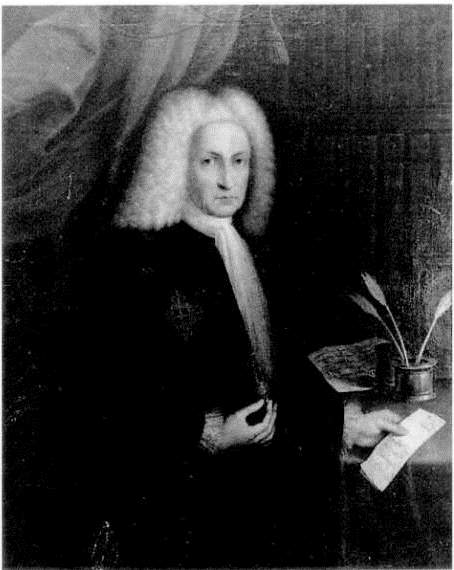
Luis Bartolomé de Salazar y Castro

Luis Bartolomé de Salazar y Castro (born 24 August 1658 in Valladolid, died 9 February 1734 in Madrid) was a Spanish genealogist. Called by some the "prince of genealogists," he is one of the most cited Spanish chroniclers. The collection of documents he gathered throughout his life, preserved in the Royal Academy of History of Spain, is one of the basic sources for the research of Iberian lineages.
