= Treaty of Ágreda (1304) =

1304 treaty between Castile and Aragon

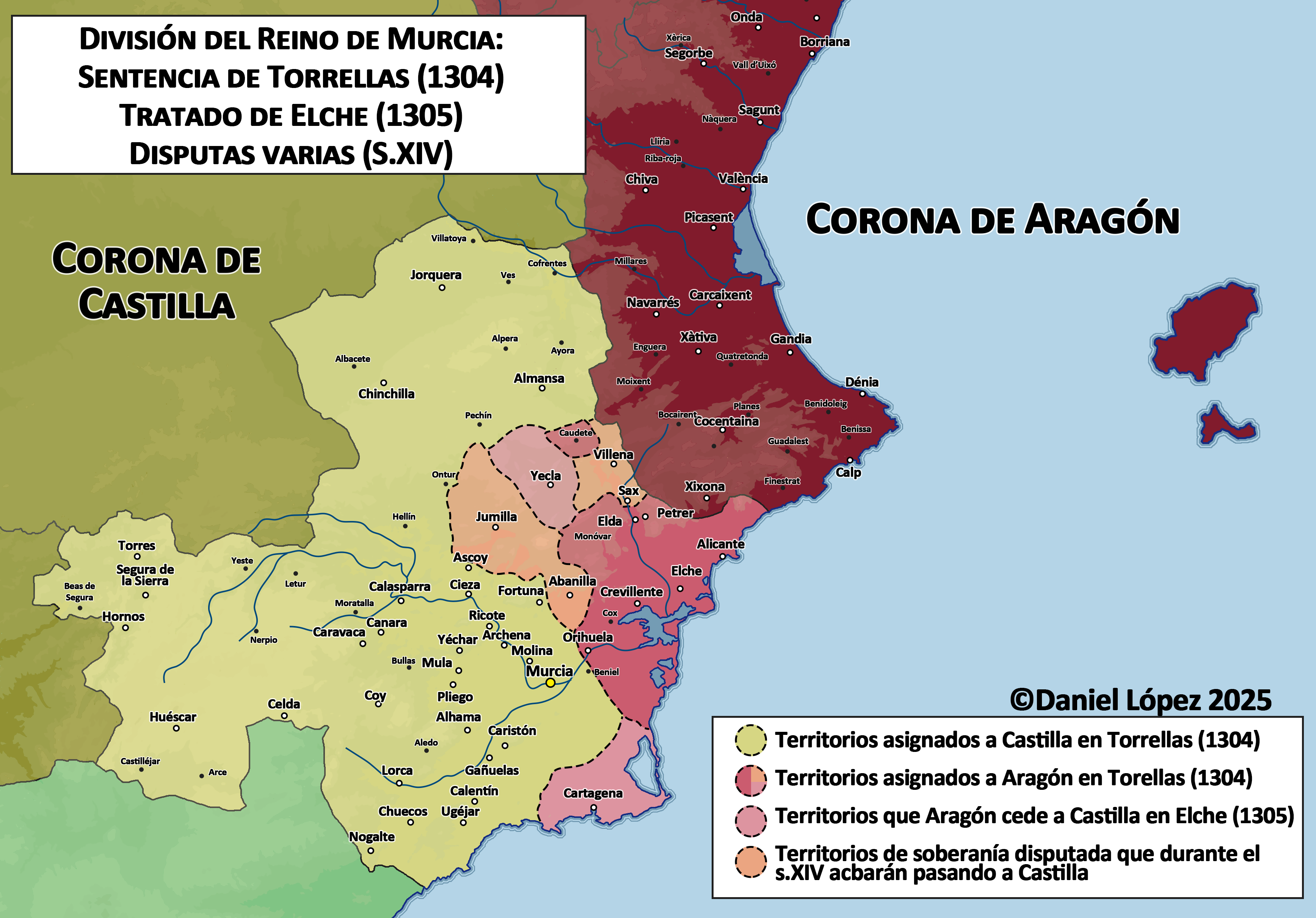
Map showing the lands exchanged in the treaties of Ágreda and Elche

The treaty of Ágreda, sometimes erroneously called the treaty of Torrellas, was signed on 9 August 1304 between the Crown of Castile and the Crown of Aragon resolved the disputed succession to Castile following the death of King Alfonso X in 1284 and demarcated the disputed border in the Kingdom of Murcia.

Negotiations took place near the border of the two kingdoms, at Ágreda on the Castilian side and Tarazona on the Aragonese. King Ferdinand IV of Castile and King James II of Aragon were present with their courts. The negotiations were mediated by King Denis of Portugal, who issued an arbitral decision at Torrellas, near Tarazona in Aragonese territory, on 8 August.

== Background ==
In his last will and testament, Alfonso X had given the king of France the right to defend the rights of inheritance of Alfonso's grandsons, the sons of his late heir, Fernando de la Cerda. In 1288, however, Alfonso's second son, Sancho IV, negotiated the Treaty of Lyon with King Philip IV of France whereby the latter dropped his support for Sancho's nephews. The elder of the nephews, Alfonso de la Cerda, then sought the support of King Alfonso III of Aragon, who had him crowned in opposition to Sancho IV. The young king in exile then ceded Murcia to James, who conquered it between 1296 and 1301. He also invaded lands of the Lordship of Villena. The resolution of the war over Murcia was dependent on a resolution of the disputed Castilian succession.

The infante John of Valencia de Campos, the younger brother of Sancho IV and uncle of Alfonso de la Cerda, could claim a share of the kingdom through his father's will. In 1295, he was recognzied as King of León by King Denis of Portugal. The result was an alliance between Portugal, John of Valencia de Campos, Aragon and Alfonso de la Cerda against Ferdinand IV. In 1300, however, John made peace with Ferdinand and became his close ally.

== Negotiations ==
The treaty, originally drawn up in the Castilian language, was eventually copied into the Livro Quinto, a cartulary of King Denis's chancery, where it is accompanied by six subsidiary documents. These documents trace the progress of the negotiations that culminated in the treaty. On 20 February 1304, Ferdinand IV appointed his uncle, John of Valencia de Campos, as his representative. John met with James II and Alfonso de la Cerda, who claimed the throne of Castile, on 20 April for preliminary negotiations. There were six separate agreements negotiated before the finally treaty as part of the process:

1. On 20 April, Alfonso and John (on behalf of Ferdinand IV) agreed to accept the arbitration of James II and Denis over the right to the throne of Castile.
2. On 20 April, James II submitted his claims to Murcia to the arbitration of King Denis, John of Valencia and Bishop Jimeno de Ahe, handing them the castles of Ariza, Berdejo, Somed, Borja and Malón as surety.
3. On 21 April, in a separate agreement, James II promised the arbitrators that he would not attack the castles he handed over.
4. On 3 May, Ferdinand IV submitted his claims to Murcia to the arbitration of King Denis, John of Valencia and Bishop Jimeno de Ahe, handing them the castles of Alfaro, Cervera, Autón, San Esteban and Atienza as surety.
5. On 7 May, Ferdinand IV agreed to accept the arbitral decision of King Denis.
6. On 10 June, Ferdinand informed Denis that he and James had reached an agreement regarding the Murcian border.

On 1 August 1304, Ferdinand IV appointed his chancellors, Ferrench Gómez and Diego García, to act as his proxies at Ágreda for the Murcian dispute. He empowered the infante John to act as his proxy in the case of Alfonso de la Cerda. He himself did not cross the border.

== Arbitral decisions and treaty signing ==
As a result of these agreements, two arbitral tribunals handed down decisions in two separate suits on 8 August. King Denis, John of Valencia and Bishop Jimeno demarcated the border between the two crowns in Murcia, while King Denis and King James decided the fate of Alfonso de la Cerda. A record of the latter sentence still exists, but no record of the former sentence has been preserved.

Following the sentences handed down in Torrellas (Torrijos) in Aragon, the final peace treaty between the sovereigns was signed at Ágreda in Castile. James II, Ferdinand IV, Denis and John of Valencia de Campos were the signatories. In the words of the treaty:

...in order to secure loyalty between us, King of Castile and King of Aragon, and better secure what has been established, agreed and signed by us, we decide, for our good and advancement, to include in this agreement the said King of Portugal and Prince Don Juan, so as to be closer to each other, as well as our successors, in loyalty and peace, thus remaining friends of our friends and foes of our foes.

In the treaty, Aragon was awarded many cities north of the Segura, and James retained a portion of Villena. However, the treaty did not establish a definitive border, something only finalized the following year by the Treaty of Elche. According to the Crónica of Ramon Muntaner:

And the king of Aragón restored the kingdom of Murcia to King Don Fernando, except for the part he had conquered, that his grandfather, King James I, had given as a dowry for his daughter to Don Manuel, the brother of King Alfonso [X] of Castile. And since that lady died without children, the land had to be returned to the king of Aragón and because of King James's great friendship with his son-in-law, King Alfonso, and with Infante Don Manuel, who was also his son-in-law, he allowed Don Manuel to keep the land. And now the king of Aragón wants it back and by rights and with reason; and thus in this peace treaty, he will recover it, that is, Alicante, Elche, Aspe, Petrer, the Valley of Elda and Novelda, and la Mola, Crevillente, Abanilla, Callosa, Orihuela, and Guardamar.

== Bibliography ==
- Kagay, Donald J. (2008). "The Dynastic Dimension of International Conflict in Fourteenth-Century Iberia". Mediterranean Studies. 17: 80. doi:10.2307/41167393. ISSN 1074-164X. JSTOR 41167393.
- Kagay, Donald J.; Villalon, L.J. Andrew (2021). Conflict in Fourteenth-Century Iberia: Aragon vs. Castile and the War of the Two Pedros. Leiden: Brill. ISBN 978-90-04-42505-7.
- Kinkade, Richard P. (2019). Dawn of a Dynasty: The Life and Times of Infante Manuel of Castile. Toronto: University of Toronto Press. ISBN 9781487530501 – via De Gruyter.
- Sá-Nogueira, Bernardo de (2012). "Why Was It Nearly Forgotten? The 1304 Ágreda Treaty between Fernando IV of Castile and Jaume II of Aragon". e-Journal of Portuguese History. 10 (2): 1–22. doi:10.26300/19dp-c875.
