= Juan Alfonso de la Cerda =

Spanish noble (1295–1347)

- lord of Gibraleón
- Arms of the House de la Cerda
- Born: 1295; France
- Died: 7 August 1347 (aged 52)
- Noble family: House of la Cerda
- Spouse: Maria Alfonso of Portugal
- Father: Alfonso de la Cerda
- Mother: Matilde of Brienne

Juan Alfonso de la Cerda (1295 – August 7, 1347) was Lord of Gibraleón, Huelva, Real de Manzanares and Deza.

He was the son of Alfonso de la Cerda, grandson of Ferdinand de la Cerda. His mother was Matile of Brienne, daughter of John I of Brienne, Count of Eu. He married Maria Alfonso de Portugal (illegitimate daughter of King Denis of Portugal).

He served under Alfonso XI of Castile in the battle of Gibraltar in 1333. He also took part in the Siege of Algeciras (1342-1344), which culminated in the city's surrender in 1344.
