= Alfonso de la Cerda =

Castilian prince (1270–1333)

- Baron of Lunel; Lord of Alba, Bejar, Gibraleón
- Arms of Alfonso
- Born: 1270; Valladolid
- Died: 1333 (aged 63); Ávila
- Noble family: House of la Cerda
- Spouse: Matilde of Brienne
- Issue: Fernando Alfonso; Alfonso; Henry; Luis; Margarita; Juan Alfonso; María; Inés
- Father: Ferdinand de la Cerda
- Mother: Blanche of France

Alfonso de la Cerda, (Valladolid 1270 - Ávila 1333), called "the Disinherited", was the elder son of Ferdinand de la Cerda and his wife Blanche of France, and was a grandson of Alfonso X of Castile. Alfonso and his brother Fernando were candidates for the Castilian-Leonese crown during the reigns of Sancho IV of Castile, Ferdinand IV of Castile and Alfonso XI of Castile. In 1331, Alfonso renounced his rights and swore allegiance to Alfonso XI of Castile.

== Biography ==
When Ferdinand de la Cerda died in 1275, Alfonso's grandmother, Violant of Aragon, took him and his newborn brother Fernando to Aragon. They were kept there 13 years in the fortress of Xàtiva.

Alfonso's grandfather, King Alfonso X of Castile, established a division of his realm. Sancho was to inherit Castile and Alfonso was to inherit León, according to historian Joaquín Cuevas Aller. After Alfonso X's death in 1284, the Leonese throne was usurped by Sancho, who would reign as Sancho IV. In September 1288, King Alfonso III of Aragon released Alfonso de la Cerda and proclaimed him king of Castile and Leon. Despite this support from the King of Aragon, Alfonso was unable to regain the throne. In 1304, as part of the Treaty of Torrellas, James II of Aragon and Ferdinand IV of Castile Alfonso agreed to resign all claims on the throne of León. In return, he was appointed Lord of Alba, Bejar and Gibraleón, and other manors, possessions and revenues, distributed throughout the Castilian-Leonese territory, in order that Alfonso de la Cerda could not form a large independent dominion.

Later, Charles IV of France gave Alfonso de la Cerda the title of Baron de Lunel, a municipality located in the region of Languedoc-Roussillon, France.

== Death ==
On the death of Alfonso de la Cerda, his body was buried in the Monastery of Santa María la Real de Las Huelgas de Burgos.

== Marriage and offspring ==
In 1290, Alfonso married Matilde of Brienne, daughter of John I of Brienne. They had seven children:

- Alfonso de la Cerda (France, 1289 - Gentilly, France, 15 April 1327), named of Spain, Archdeacon of Paris to 1322, Baron de Lunel, 1324, Lord of Tafalla and Caparroso July 1325. Married Isabelle d'Antoing, Viscountess Ghent, the daughter of Hugh IV, Lord of Antoing, and Mary, Viscountess Ghent. He was the father of
  - Charles de la Cerda, Count of Angoulême and Constable of France.
- Henry de La Cerda (France, 1290 - after 1326), Archdeacon of Paris after his brother Alfonso.
- Luis de la Cerda (France, 1291 - La Motte du Rhône, 5 July 1348), Count of Clermont and Talmont, Admiral of France, chief prince of the Canary Islands 15 November 1344. In 1306, he married Leonor de Guzmán, daughter of Alonso Perez de Guzmán and María Alfonso Coronel. Remarried in 1346 to Guiot d'Uzes, daughter of Robert I, Vicomte d'Uzes and Guiot de Posquières.
- Margarita de la Cerda (1293 - after 1328), Lady of Lemos and Sarria. Married to the Infante Philip of Castile y Molina, son of King Sancho IV of Castile and Leon and Queen María de Molina. She was buried alongside her husband Prince Philip at the Monastery of Santa Clara Allariz in Galicia.
- Juan Alfonso de la Cerda (France, 1295 - 7 August 1347), Lord of Gibraleón, Huelva, Real de Manzanares and Deza. Married Maria Alfonso of Portugal (illegitimate daughter of King Denis of Portugal).
- María de la Cerda (Spain, 1305 - before 1355), Lady of Villafranca de Valcárcel. Married Alfonso Melendez de Guzmán. She was buried in the monastery of San Francisco de Villafranca, near Valcárcel.
- Inés de la Cerda (Spain, 1307 - 24 October 1339), Lady of Bembibre. Married Fernán Rodríguez de Villalobos, Lord of Villalobos. She was buried in the monastery of San Francisco de Villafranca, near Valcárcel.

He also had a natural child by an unknown mother:

- Fernando Alfonso de la Cerda (b. 1286 - 1340c.), married to Elvira de Ayala.
