= Treaty of Elche =

1305 treaty between Castile and Aragon

The Treaty of Elche was an agreement between the Crowns of Castile and Aragon signed on 19 May 1305. The treaty revised the borders put down by the Treaty of Torrellas in the previous year. The borders under dispute were those created by the conquests of James II of Aragon in Murcia between 1296 and 1300. Murcia was (before 1296) a dependency of Castile. The chief exchange effected by the new treaty of Elche was the important port city of Cartagena, which returned to Castile.

== See also ==
- List of treaties
