= Ampudia =

- municipality
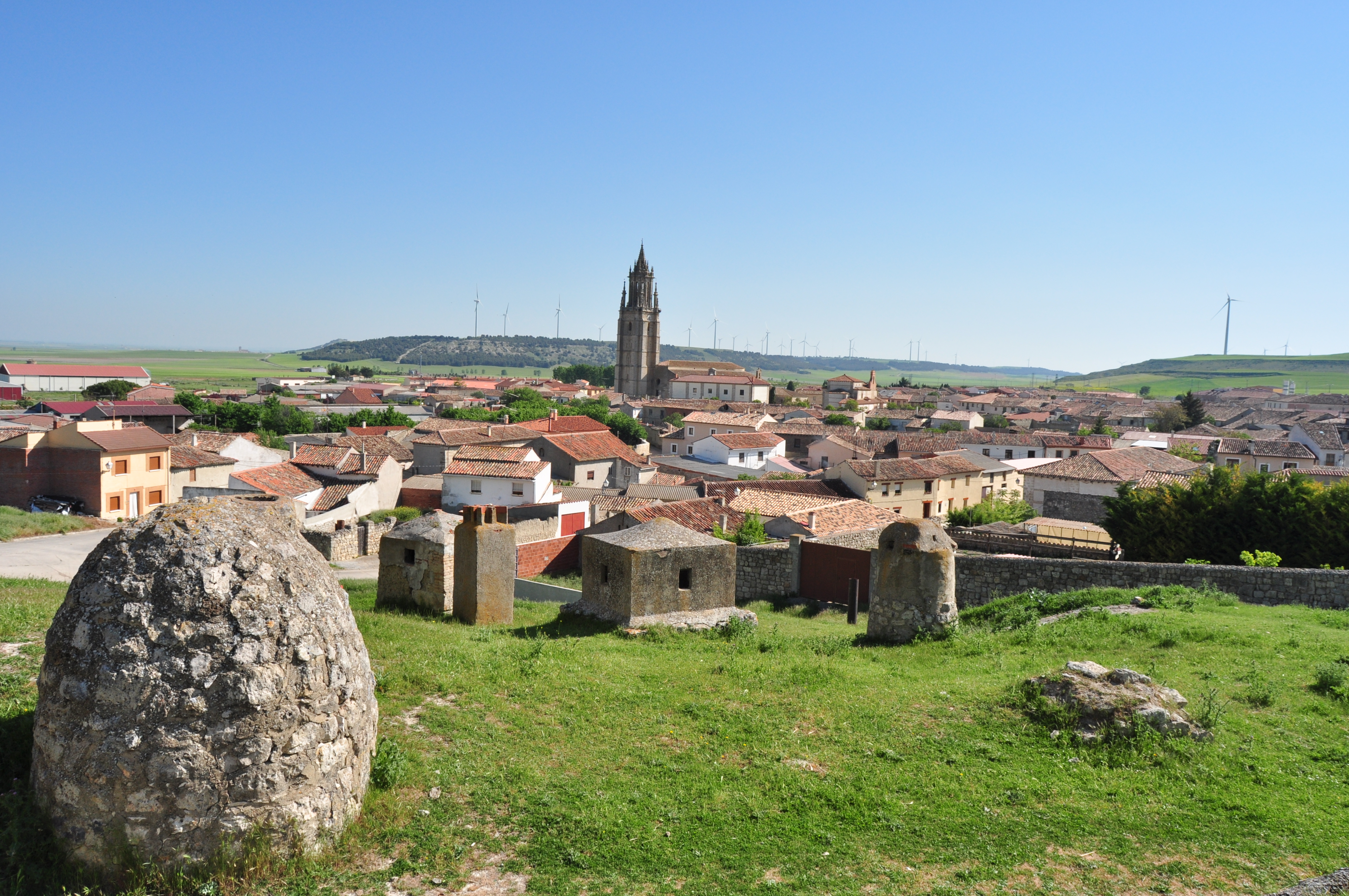

- Coat of arms
- Interactive map of Ampudia
- Coordinates: 41°55′N 4°47′W
- Country: Spain
- Autonomous community: Castile and León
- Province: Palencia
- Municipality: Ampudia

Area
  - Total: 133 km^{2} (51 sq mi)

Population (2004)
  - Total: 677
  - Density: 5.09/km^{2} (13.2/sq mi)
- Time zone: UTC+1 (CET)
  - Summer (DST): UTC+2 (CEST)
- Website: Official website

Ampudia is a municipality located in the province of Palencia, Castile and León, Spain. According to the 2004 census (INE), the municipality has a population of 677 inhabitants.

== Castle of Ampudia ==
Ampudia is the location of a fifteenth-Century castle, now privately owned and open for tours. The castle was one site of the filming of the 1961 American film El Cid.

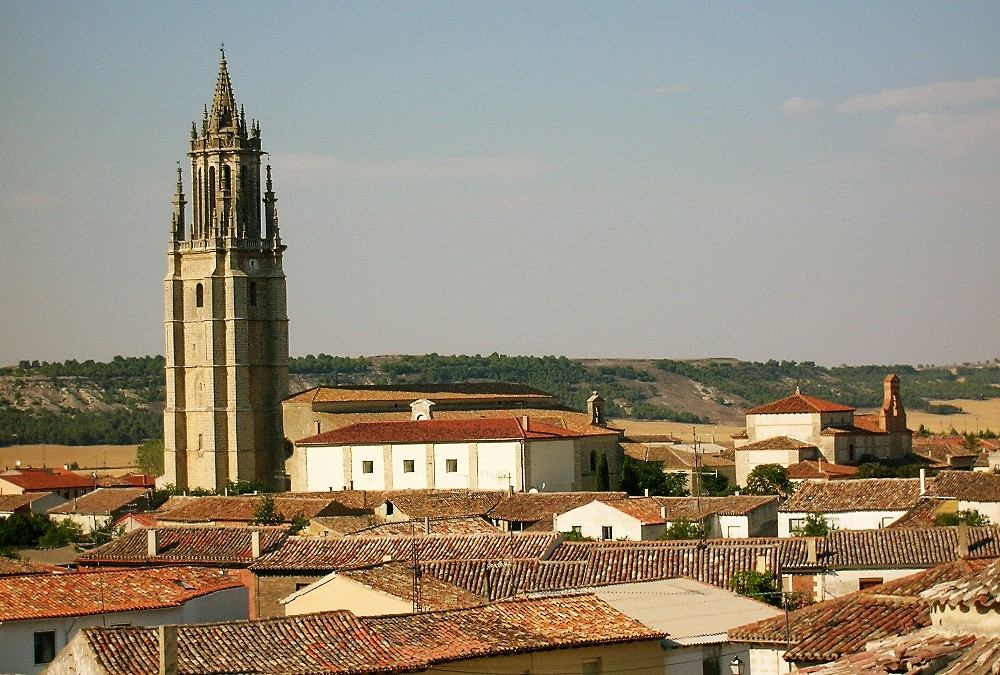
View of the town, with the tower of the colegiata

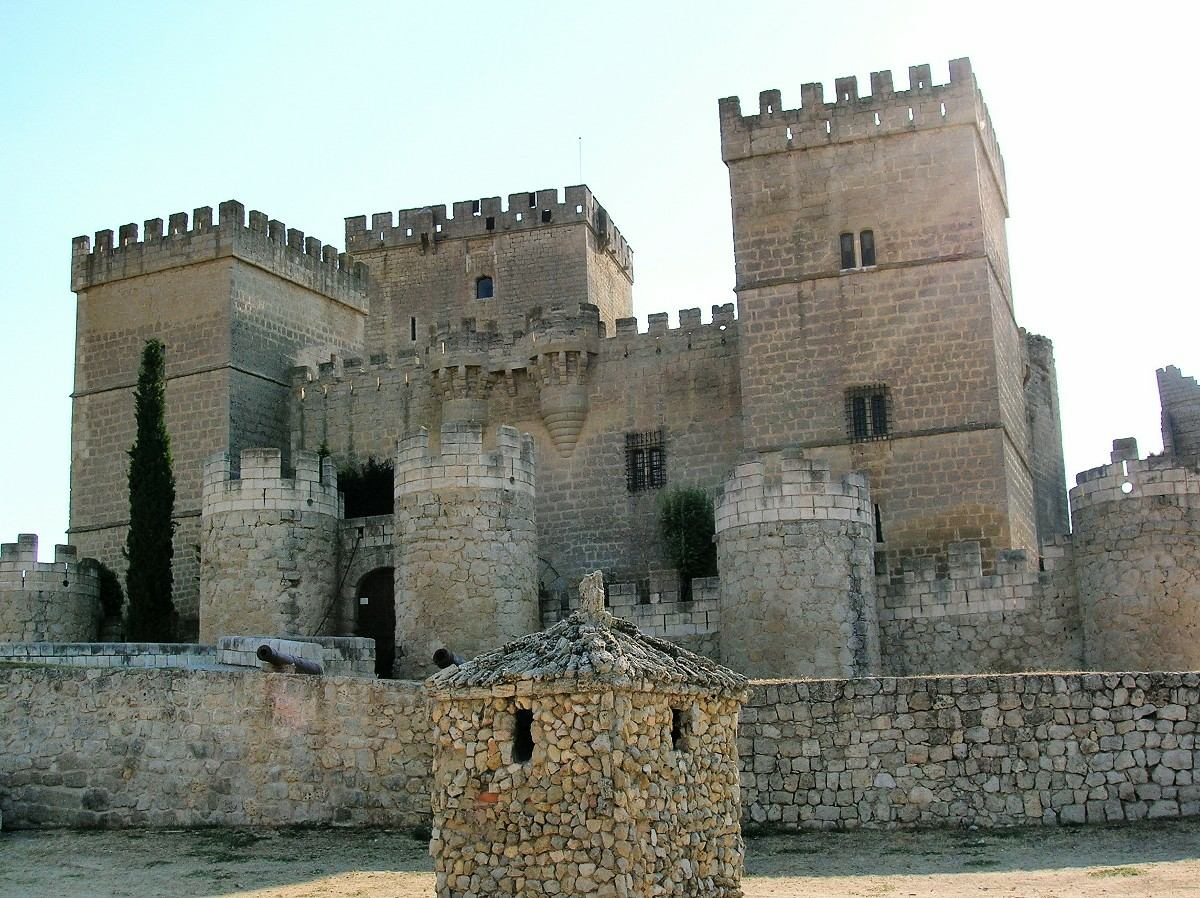
The medieval 'Castle of Ampudia'
