= Deza, Soria =

Deza
- Municipality
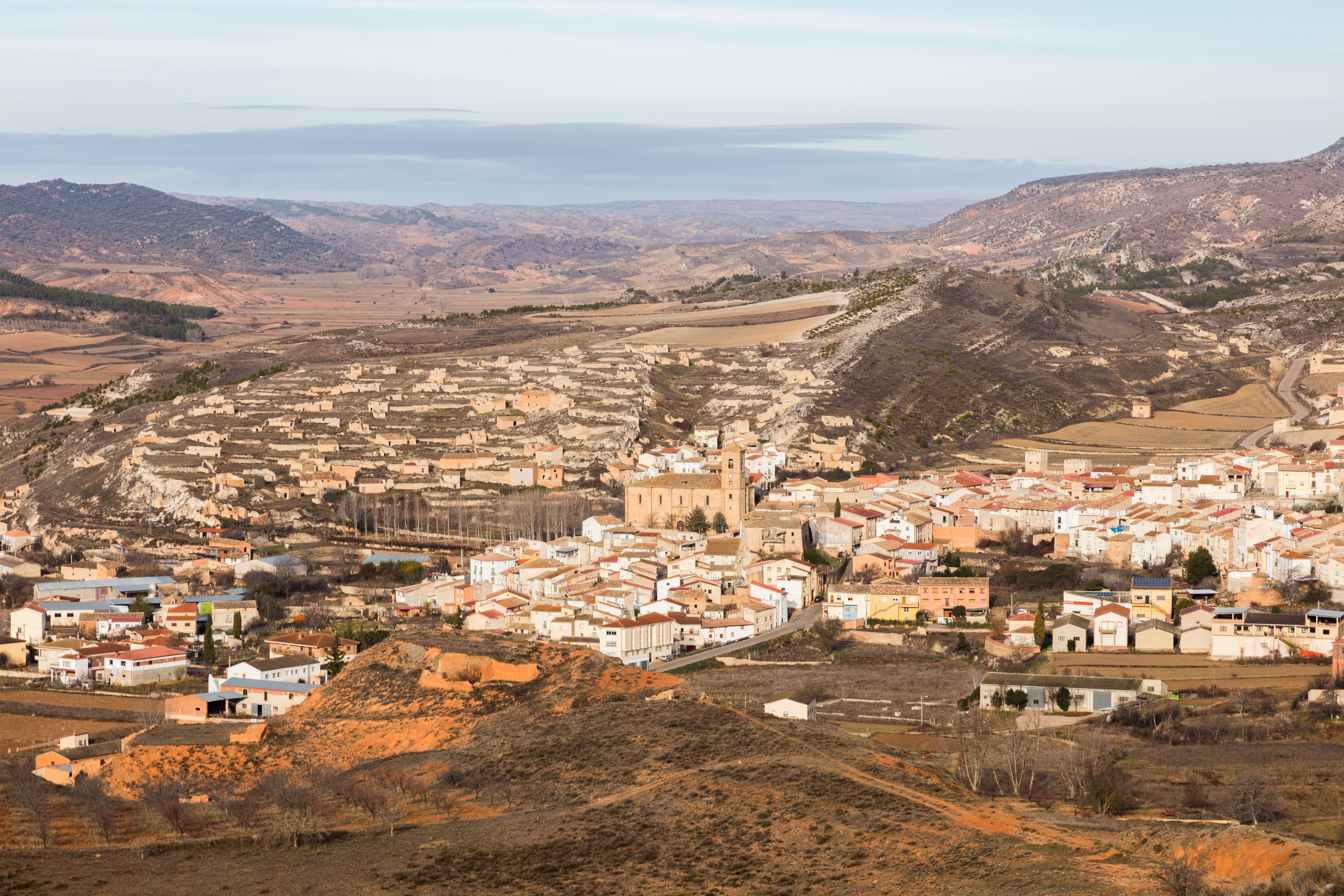
- General view of Deza, Soria, Spain

- Coat of arms

- Municipality of Deza

- Location in Spain. Deza (Spain)
- Country: Spain
- Autonomous community: Castile and León
- Province: Soria
- Municipality: Deza

Area
  - Total: 118.15 km^{2} (45.62 sq mi)
- Elevation: 884 m (2,900 ft)

Population (2025-01-01)
  - Total: 162
  - Density: 1.37/km^{2} (3.55/sq mi)
- Time zone: UTC+1 (CET)
  - Summer (DST): UTC+2 (CEST)
- Website: Official website

Deza is a municipality located in the province of Soria, in the autonomous community of Castile and León, Spain.
