= Francisco Cerdá y Rico =

Spanish erudite, humanist, jurist, and writer

Francisco Cerdá y Rico (8 June 1739 – 5 January 1800) was a Spanish erudite, humanist, jurist and writer.
