= Philip of Castile, Lord of Cabrera and Ribera =

Philip of Castile
- Lord of Cabrera and Ribera
- Arms of Castile & León
- Born: 28 May 1292; Seville, Crown of Castile
- Died: April 1327 (aged 35); Madrid
- Noble family: Castilian House of Ivrea
- Spouse: Margarita de la Cerda
- Father: Sancho IV of Castile
- Mother: María de Molina

Philip of Castile (Seville, 28 May 1292 – Madrid, April 1327), was an infante of Castile, son of Sancho IV of Castile and María de Molina.

He was Lord of Cabrera and Ribera and regent of his nephew Alfonso XI of Castile.

He married his cousin Margarita de la Cerda, daughter of Alfonso de la Cerda.
