= Sancho IV of Castile =

King of Castile and León from 1284 to 1295

Sancho IV
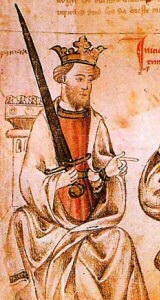
- 13th-century miniature of Sancho, currently at Biblioteca Nacional de España

King of Castile and León
- Reign: 4 April 1284 – 25 April 1295
- Predecessor: Alfonso X
- Successor: Ferdinand IV
- Born: 12 May 1258; Valladolid, Crown of Castile
- Died: 25 April 1295 (aged 36); Toledo, Crown of Castile
- Burial: Cathedral of Toledo
- Spouse: María de Molina (m. 1282)
- Issue among others...: Isabella, Queen of Aragon; Ferdinand IV, King of Castile; Alfonso; Peter, Lord of Cameros; Philip, Lord of Cabrera; Beatrice, Queen of Portugal
- House: Castilian House of Ivrea
- Father: Alfonso X of Castile
- Mother: Violant of Aragon

Sancho IV of Castile (12 May 1258 – 25 April 1295) called the Brave (el Bravo), was the king of Castile, León and Galicia (now parts of Spain) from 1284 to his death. Following his brother Ferdinand's death, he gained the support of nobles who declared him king instead of Ferdinand's son Alfonso. Faced with revolts throughout his reign, before he died he made his wife regent for his son, who became Ferdinand IV.

== Biography ==
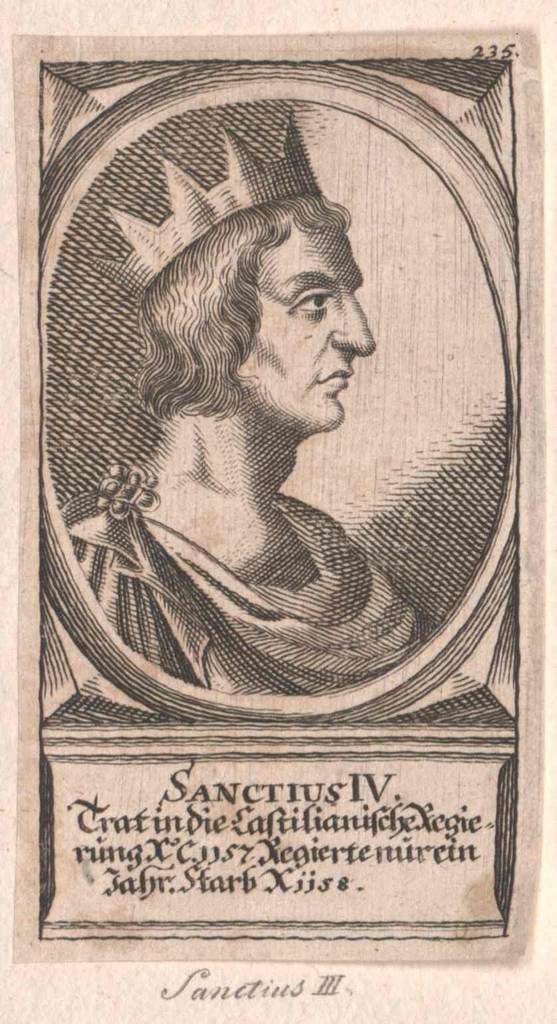
Engraving, c. 1600-1700

Sancho was the second son of Alfonso X and Yolanda, daughter of James I of Aragon. His elder brother, Ferdinand de la Cerda, died in November 1275. In 1282 Sancho assembled a coalition of nobles to declare for him against Ferdinand's son Alfonso, then took control of the kingdom when Alfonso X died in 1284. This was all against the wishes of their father, but Sancho was crowned in Toledo nevertheless.

Sancho's ascension was in part due to his rejection of his father's elitist politics. Sancho was recognised and supported by the majority of the nobility and the cities, but a sizable minority opposed him throughout his reign and worked for the heirs of Ferdinand de la Cerda. One of the leaders of the opposition was his brother John of Castile, who united to his cause the lord of Biscay, Lope Díaz III de Haro. Sancho responded by executing the Lord of Biscay and incarcerating his brother. According to the chroniclers, he cemented his hold on power by executing 4,000 other followers of Infante Alfonso, son of Ferdinand de la Cerda, in Badajoz. He executed 400 more in Talavera and more in Ávila and Toledo.

Upon dispensing with this opposition, Sancho pardoned his brother, who was released. John bided his time before fomenting revolt again: the conflict over Tarifa. He called in the aid of the Marinids in Morocco and besieged Guzmán the Good in his castle (1291). At this siege the innocent son of Guzmán died in what has been considered a famous act of heroism. Tarifa was faithfully defended until Sancho could rescue it and the Marinids retreated to the Maghreb. The intention of both John and the Sultan of Marinids, to invade, was foiled.

When James II succeeded to the Crown of Aragon, he endeavoured to bind the two crowns more closely and for Christian forces to unite to reconquer the Iberian peninsula from Islam. Indeed, both of James' predecessors had tried to do likewise. Sancho was also the friend and tutor of Juan Manuel of Castile.

Just before succumbing to a fatal illness (possibly tuberculosis) he appointed his wife, María de Molina, to act as regent for his nine-year-old son, Ferdinand IV. He died on 25 April 1295 in Toledo.

== Family ==
Sancho married María de Molina in 1282, but at first their marriage did not have the necessary papal dispensation for two reasons: First, they were first cousins once removed, and second, Sancho had been betrothed as an infant to a rich Catalan heiress named Guillerma Moncada.

Sancho and Maria had the following children:

- Isabella (1283–1328), Married first James II of Aragon and secondly John III, Duke of Brittany
- Ferdinand IV (1285–1312). Married Constance of Portugal.
- Alfonso de Castilla (1286–1291)
- Henry (1288–1299)
- Peter (1290–1319) married Maria daughter of James II of Aragon
- Philip (1292–1327). Married his cousin Margarita de la Cerda, daughter of Alfonso de la Cerda.
- Beatrice (1293–1359). Married Afonso IV of Portugal.

Sancho had three illegitimate children:

By María Alfonso Téllez de Menezes (d. Toro), wife of Juan García, Lord of Ucero:

- Violante Sánchez (died bef. 1327), who held the dowry of Ucero as its lady, married in 1293 Fernando Rodríguez de Castro, Lord of Lemos.
- Teresa Sánchez, who married Juan Alfonso Téllez de Meneses (died 5 May 1304), a Castilian nobleman, 4th Lord of Alburquerque, who became the 1st Count of Barcelos and was the Mordomo Mor (high steward) of King Denis I of Portugal, and had female issue. After the death of her first husband, she married Ruy Gil de Villalobos, with whom she had one daughter.

By another woman whose name is unknown, he had:

- Alfonso Sánchez, who married, as his second wife, María Díaz de Salcedo, but died without issue.

== Sources ==
- Coldiron, A. E. B. (2015). Printers Without Borders: Translation and Textuality in the Renaissance. Cambridge University Press.
- d'Avray, David (2015). Papacy, Monarchy and Marriage 860–1600. Cambridge University Press.
- Linehan, Peter (1995). "Castile, Portugal and Navarre". In Abulafia, David (ed.). The New Cambridge Medieval History: Volume 5, c. 1198–c. 1300. Cambridge University Press.
- Morvan, Frederic (2009). La Chevalerie bretonne et la formation de l'armee ducale, 1260–1341 (in French). Presses Universitaires de Rennes.
- Ruiz, Teofilo F. (2011). Spain's Centuries of Crisis, 1300 - 1474. Wiley.
- XXV años de la Escuela de Genealogía, Heráldica y Nobiliaria, Ed. Escuela de Genealogía, Heráldica y Nobiliaria, Hidalguia, 1985.

Sancho IV of Castile Castilian House of Ivrea Cadet branch of the House of Ivrea Born: 12 May 1258 Died: 25 April 1295
Regnal titles
| Preceded by Alfonso X | King of Castile and León; 1284–1295 | Succeeded by Ferdinand IV |
