= Grijota =

Coordinates: 42°03′N 4°35′W

- municipality
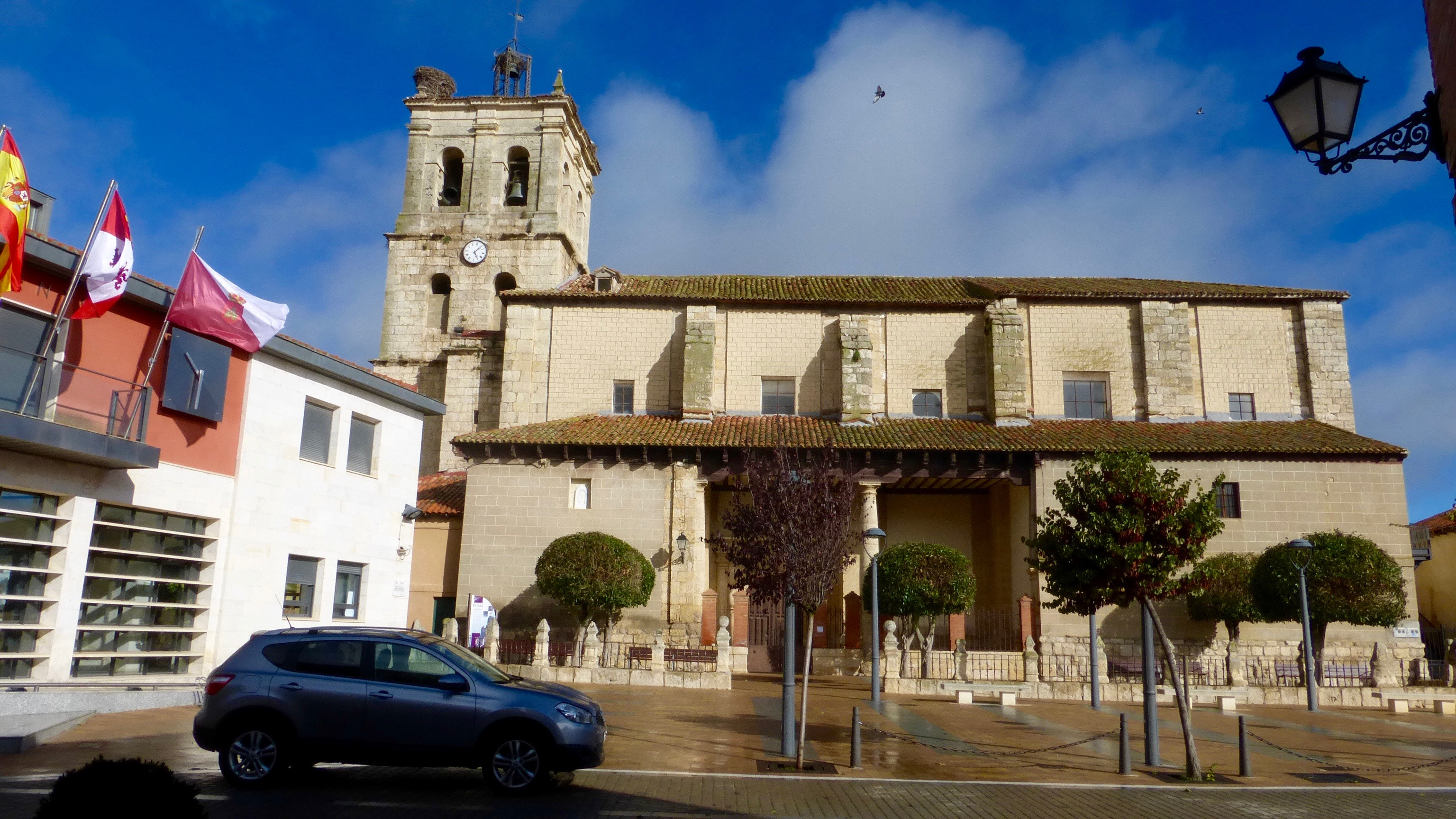

- Flag Coat of arms
- Interactive map of Grijota
- Country: Spain
- Autonomous community: Castile and León
- Province: Palencia
- Municipality: Grijota

Area
  - Total: 28 km^{2} (11 sq mi)
  - Water: 0 km^{2} (0 sq mi)
- Elevation: 734 m (2,408 ft)

Population (2025-01-01)
  - Total: 2,839
  - Density: 100/km^{2} (260/sq mi)
- Time zone: UTC+1 (CET)
  - Summer (DST): UTC+2 (CEST)
- Website: Official website

Grijota is a municipality located in the province of Palencia, Castile and León, Spain. According to the 2019 census (INE), the municipality has a population of 2,319 inhabitants.

It is 7 km away from the capital of the province, Palencia, and 57 km from the city of Valladolid, capital of the region of Castile and León. The municipality has a village and then groups of houses, some of the containing 100 or more neighbours. Thus, despite being located in an area affected by depopulation, it is in constant urban growth since the late 1990s. The first of them started to be built in 1999 and they have been building new ones since. Thanks to them Grijota is the ninth most populated municipality of the Province of Palencia.
