= Lope Díaz de Haro (died 1322) =

Spanish noble

Arms of the House of Haro.

Lope Díaz de Haro (died October, 1322) was a Spanish noble of the House of Haro, the traditional Lords of Biscay. He was the firstborn son of Diego Lopez V de Haro, Lord of Biscay. Whilst he did not inherit his father's title of Lordship over Biscay, he is best known for being the lord of Orduña-Urduña and of Balmaseda. He further served as Alférez to King Ferdinand IV of Castile.

== Family origins ==
Lope Díaz IV de Haro was the son of Diego López V de Haro and his wife, the infanta Violant of Castile. His paternal grandfather was Diego López III de Haro and his wife, Constanza de Bearn. His maternal parents were King Alfonso X of Castile, King of Castile and Leon, and his wife, Violant of Aragon, daughter of King James I of Aragon.

== Biography ==
As the firstborn son of Diego López V de Haro, Lope Diaz IV was raised believing that he would inherit the Lordship of Biscay. After a lengthy series of disputes over the succession to Biscay which often turned violent, the title passed to María Díaz II de Haro, granddaughter of María Díaz I de Haro, Lope Diaz' cousin.

With the death of Lope Díaz III de Haro who was assassinated by order of King Sancho IV of Castile in 1288, the title over Biscay passed to María Díaz I de Haro being the eldest child. After the ushering in of a new infant king Ferdinand IV of Castile after Sancho IV's death, the kingdom was thrown into chaos and Diego López V, Lope Diaz IV's father, was able to forcibly take control of Biscay away from his niece whose husband, the infante John of Castile was imprisoned at the time for crimes committed against Sancho IV in collusion with Diego Lopez III de Haro. This led to a lifelong fight between the two parties and a struggle to gain favor with the royal court, both sides having been at times considered at war with the crown.

In 1307, Diego Lopez V signed an accord which granted title over Biscay to his niece, María I Díaz de Haro only upon his death and that the stolen title would remain his until such a time. The agreement also stipulated that the title of lordship over Orduña-Urduña and of Balmaseda, previously associated with Biscay, would remain in Diego Lopez V's immediate bloodline, being transferred to Lope Diaz IV upon his death. Further, in an effort to compensate and mediate this deal, the King, Ferdinand IV of Castile gave Lope Diaz IV title over Belmonte de Miranda and of Villalba de Losa, both of which had previously belonged to the crown.

With regards to the accord reached over possession of Biscay, Juan Núñez II de Lara felt under compensated by the king and by his mother reason for which he withdrew from the royal courts in protest without completing his mandate. As a result, Diego Lopez V de Haro further received the title of Mayordomo mayor del Rey. This provoked further unrest as the infante John of Castile, husband of Maria I also withdrew from court in protest.

By 1309, the many disputes had been resolved and all parties involved participated in a campaign against the Kingdom of Granada. This campaign, while successful in some respects such as the capture of Gibraltar, culminated in the disastrous and demoralizing Siege of Algeciras of 1309. It was here that a majority of Ferdinand IV's army would desert him, including the infante John of Castile. In 1310, Diego Lopez V died in camp of wounds received during the siege leaving his possessions with the exception of Biscay to Lope Diaz IV.

In 1311, Lope Diaz IV participated in a rebellion against King Ferdinand IV of Castile together with the infante John of Castile and Juan Núñez II de Lara, head of the House of Lara. Their rebellion favored the overthrow of Ferdinand IV and the installation of his brother, the infante Pedro de Castilla y Molina instead. Eventually, the rebellion faltered after a lack of support from the queen consort, María de Molina.

== Death ==
Lope Díaz IV de Haro died in October 1322 without leaving behind any descendants. Upon his death, all his titles passed to his brother, Fernando Díaz de Haro.

Preceded by Diego López V de Haro	Señor de Orduña y Valmaseda; 1310–1322	Succeeded by Fernando Díaz de Haro
Preceded by Diego López V de Haro	Alférez del Rey; 1310–1311	Succeeded by Juan Alfonso de Haro
