= Fernando Díaz de Haro =

Spanish noble

Arms of the House of Haro.

Fernando Díaz de Haro was a Spanish noble of the House of Haro. He was the second born son of Diego López V de Haro, the Lord of Biscay, and his wife, the infanta Violante de Castilla y Aragón, daughter of Alfonso X of Castile. Fernando became lord of Orduña and Balmaseda in 1322, after the death of his brother, Lope Díaz IV de Haro who died without leaving any descendants.

== Family Origins ==
Fernando Diaz was the son of Diego López V de Haro, who rose to power after forcibly taking the title over Lordship of Biscay. His mother was Violant of Castile. His paternal grandparents were Diego Lopez III de Haro, and his wife, Constanza de Bearn. His maternal grandparents were King Alfonso X of Castile and his wife, Violant of Aragon, daughter of King James I of Aragon.

== Biography ==
The exact date of Fernando's birth is unknown but it is known that he married in 1315 with Maria of Portugal, Lady of Meneses and Orduña, daughter of the infante Alfonso de Portugal and his wife, Violante Manuel, sister of Juan Manuel, Prince of Villena.

At the death of his brother in 1322, Fernando Diaz inherited title over Orduña and Balmaseda. It appears that he passed these titles on to his son, but that they eventually wound up in the hands of the monarchy, and this once powerful ancient bloodline of the House of Haro falls from prominence.

His date of death is unknown.

== Marriage and Descendants ==
Fernando Diaz married Maria of Portugal, Lady of Meneses and Orduña in 1315. She was the widow of Tello Alfonso de Meneses and daughter of Alfonso de Portugal, granddaughter of Alfonso III of Portugal and his wife, Violante Manuel, tracing her ancestry back to Ferdinand III of Castile the saint. This marriage bore two sons:

- Diego López VI de Haro, who inherited his father's titles over Orduña and Balmaseda, possibly the last Haro to hold them. Married Juana de Castro, the daughter of Pedro Fernández de Castro, lord of Sarria and Condado de Lemos, and his wife, Isabel Ponce de León.
- Pedro López de Haro, who died early.

== See also ==
- House of Haro
