= María Díaz II de Haro =

Spanish noble

Arms of the House of Haro.

María Díaz II de Haro (c. 1318 or 1320 - 16 September 1348) was a Spanish noble of the House of Haro. She was the daughter of Juan de Castilla y Haro and his wife, Isabel of Portugal and was Lady of Biscay from 1334 until her death in 1348.

== Family Origins ==
Daughter of Juan de Castilla y Haro and of Isabel of Portugal, she was the paternal granddaughter of infante John of Castile and of María I Díaz de Haro, Lady of Biscay. Her maternal grandparents were infante Afonso of Portugal and his wife, Violante Manuel.

== Biography ==
In 1326, her father was assassinated in Toro by order of King Alfonso XI of Castile who also subsequently confiscated all her father's property. María Díaz II was taken to France where she lived in the city of Bayonne. While at Bayonne, Juan Núñez III de Lara, head of the House of Lara and noble Magnate of the Kingdom of Castile and Leon solicited her hand in marriage. The two were married that same year.

During the first part of the reign of Alfonso XI, her husband Juan Núñez III reclaimed from the king in her name, all properties that had previously belonged to her father. In the process, Juan Núñez III fought against the king on various occasions until his final definitive reconciliation with the king after his being besieged and defeated at Lerma. After the peace between her husband and the king, all parties were able to coexist peacefully with the Castilian-Leonese monarch. Alfonso XI ratified the possession of the Lordship of Biscay as belonging to María Díaz II and promised to not use the title himself in any way, something that he had previously done since 1332.

== Death and Sepulcher ==
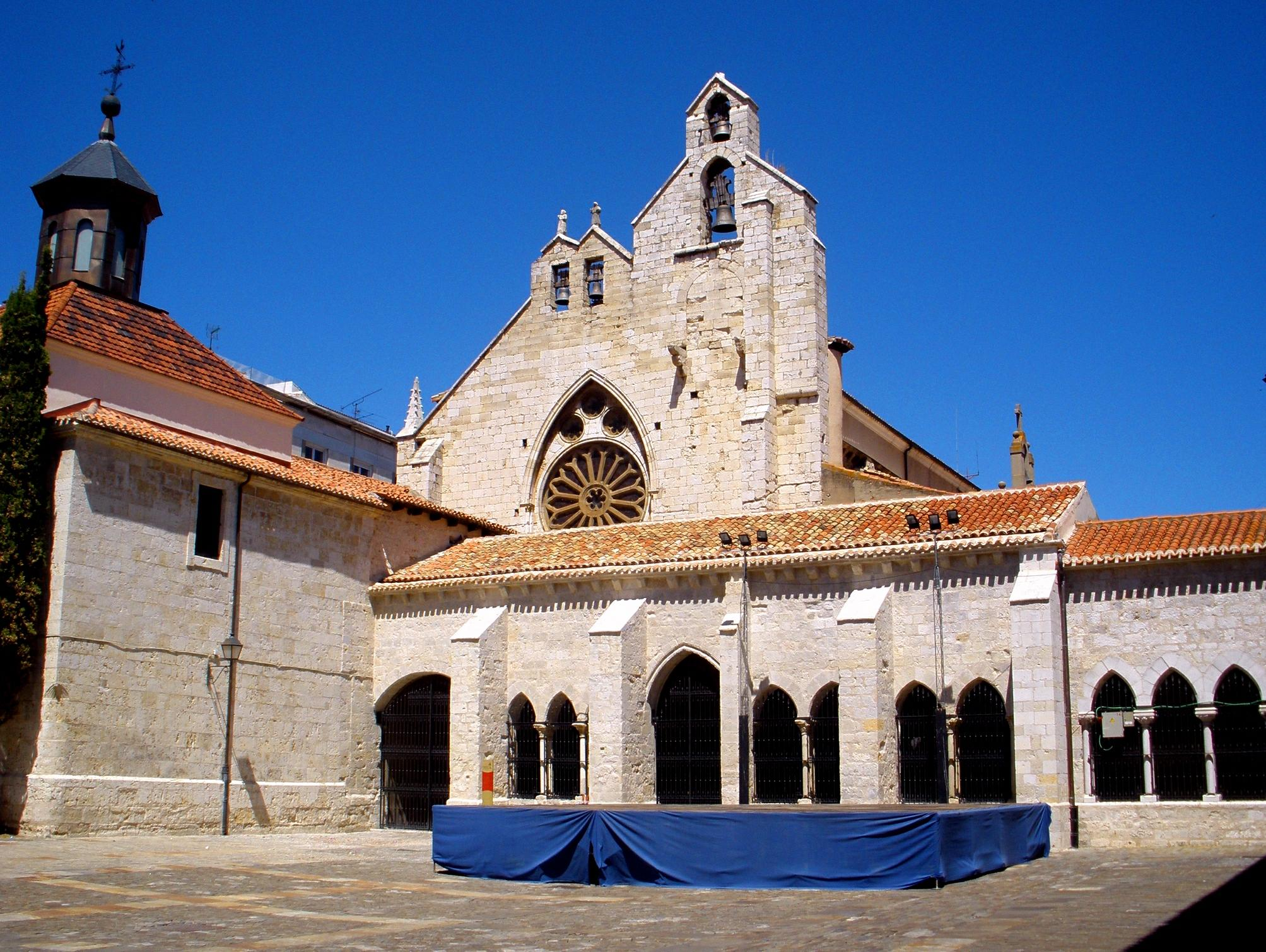
Iglesia de San Francisco, Palencia that formed part of the former convent of San Francisco where María Díaz de Haro was buried beside her son, the infante Tello de Castilla.

María Díaz II died on 16 September 1348 shortly after giving birth to her son, Nuño Díaz de Haro who went on to briefly inherit the Lordship of Biscay after the death of his father in 1350 at Burgos.

She was buried at the Convento de San Francisco in Palencia. Today, the only remains on the site are those of the church. Upon his death, Tello of Castile, the husband of María Díaz II's daughter Juana de Lara was also buried at the convent. The sacristy of the church still contains the grave of Tello de Castilla who wrote in his will the desire to be buried in a silver coffin. Unfortunately the sepulcher belonging to María Díaz II de Haro has been lost to time, probably having been destroyed during the Peninsular War when the convent of San Francisco de Palencia was converted into a barracks billeting French troops. It could have also been lost when the Convent of San Francisco was sold in 1835.

== Marriage and Descendants ==
In 1331, she married Juan Núñez III de Lara, the head of the House of Lara and the grandson of Alfonso X of Castile. The couple had the following children:

- Juana de Lara, Lady of Lara and of Biscay. Wife of Tello de Castilla, she was assassinated in Seville at the age of 26 by order of King Peter of Castile.
- Lope Díaz de Haro, died in childhood.
- Isabel de Lara, Lady of Lara and of Biscay, she succeeded her sister in the possession of the Lordship of Biscay. In 1354, she married infante Juan de Aragón y Castilla, son of King Alfonso IV of Aragon. Her husband was assassinated by his cousin, Peter of Castile, in 1358, and she was poisoned three years later, in 1361.
- Nuño Díaz de Haro, Lord of Lara and of Biscay. He was named Lord of Biscay in 1350 at the age of 2. Nuño Díaz died in infancy in 1352, at the age of 4.

== See also ==
- House of Haro
- María Díaz I de Haro
- Juan de Castilla y Haro
- House of Lara
- Lord of Biscay

Preceded by Juan de Castilla y Haro; María Díaz I de Haro	Lady of Biscay; 1326–1348	Succeeded by Nuño Díaz de Haro
