= Violant of Castile =

Daughter of Alfonso X of Castile, and Violant of Aragon

Violant of Castile (Spanish: Violante de Castilla y Aragón; 1265 – 1287/1308) was infanta of Castile and Lady of Biscay on her marriage to Diego López V de Haro. She was the daughter of Alfonso X of Castile, and Violant of Aragon.

== Life ==
She was the daughter of Alfonso X of Castile, and Violant of Aragon. On her father's side, she was the granddaughter of Ferdinand III of Castile, and his first wife, Elisabeth of Swabia. On her mother's side, she was the granddaughter of James I of Aragon, and his second wife, Violant of Hungary.

Infanta Violant of Castile was born in 1265. In 1272 it was agreed, and a year later confirmed that she would marry King Henry I of Navarre's son and heir apparent, Theobald, which would establish an alliance between Castile and Navarre. The marriage proposal failed with the death of the young Theobald after he fell from a battlement at the castle of Estella in 1273. Later, in 1282, she married Diego López V de Haro, Lord of Biscay.

Her date of death is unknown, but it must have occurred sometime between 12 March 1287 and 30 January 1308. After her death, she was buried at the now-destroyed Monasterio de San Francisco de Burgos. In the same monastery was buried later her husband.

== Marriage and issue ==
In her marriage to Diego López V de Haro, Lord of Biscay, they had four children:

- Lope Díaz IV de Haro (1285–1322). Señor of Orduña and Valmaseda and Alférez of the king, Ferdinand IV of Castile. Died without descendants.
- Fernando Díaz de Haro. Señor of Orduña and Valmaseda after the death of his brother. Married in 1315 with Maria of Portugal, Lady of Meneses and Orduña, daughter of the infante Alfonso de Portugal and his wife, Violante Manuel, sister of Juan Manuel, Prince of Villena.
- Pedro López de Haro, who died in infancy.
- María Díaz de Haro. Señora of Tordehumos. Married Juan Núñez II de Lara, señor of Lara and Albarracín.

== Bibliography ==
- González-Doria, Fernando (2000). Diccionario heráldico y nobiliario de los Reinos de España. San Fernando de Henares (Madrid): Ediciones Trigo S. L. ISBN 84-89787-17-4.
- González Jiménez, Manuel (October 2004). Alfonso X el Sabio. Barcelona: Editorial Ariel S. A. ISBN 84-344-6758-5.
- Ibañez de Segovia Peralta y Mendoza, Gaspar (1777). Memorias historicas del Rei D. Alonso el Sabio i observaciones a su chronica. Madrid: en casa de D. Joachin Ibarra.
- De Loaysa, Jofré; García Martínez, Antonio (1982). Crónicas de los Reyes de Castilla Fernando III, Alfonso X, Sancho IV y Fernando IV (1248-1305) (in Latin and Spanish). Murcia: Academia Alfonso X el Sabio. ISBN 84-00-05017-7.
- Mariana, Juan de (1855). Historia General de España (Reedición ed.). Madrid: Imprenta y librería de Gaspar y Roig. "JUAN DE MARIANA."
- Novia de Salcedo, Pedro (1851). Defensa histórica, legislativa y económica del señorío de Vizcaya y provincias de Alava y Guipúzcoa. Volumen II. Bilbao: Librería de Delmas e Hijo.
- Salvador Martínez, H (2003). Alfonso X el Sabio. Madrid: Ediciones Polifemo. ISBN 978-84-86547-66-0.
- Menéndez Pidal de Navascués, Faustino (1982). Heráldica medieval española. Vol. I: La Casa Real de Castilla y León. Hidalguía: Instituto Luis de Salazar y Castro. ISBN 84-00-05150-5.
- Menezo Otero, Juan José (2005). Reinos y Jefes de Estado desde el 712. Madrid: Historia Hispana. ISBN 84-604-9610-4.
- Pérez Algar, Félix (1997). Alfonso X el Sabio: Biografía. Madrid: Studium Generalis. ISBN 84-605-6339-1.
- Rodríguez García, Francisco (2002). Crónica del Señorío de Vizcaya. Editorial Maxtor Librería. ISBN 84-9761-029-6.
- Valdeón Baruque, Julio (2003). Alfonso X: la forja de la España moderna. Ediciones Temas de Hoy, S.A. ISBN 84-8460-277-X.
- Valdeón Baruque, Julio (1986). Alfonso X el Sabio. Castilla y León: Junta de Castilla y León, Consejería de Educación y Cultura. ISBN 84-505-3366-X.
- Ybarra y López-Dóriga, Fernando de (1997). Un largo siglo de amores y desamores en el Alcázar de Sevilla (1248-1368). Sevilla: Real Academia Sevillana de Buenas Letras. ISBN 84-8093-016-0.
- Zurita, Jerónimo (2005). Anales de Aragón. Institución Fernando el Católico. ISBN 84-7820-823-2.
