= Diego López V de Haro =

Castilian noble of the House of Haro (c.1250–1310)

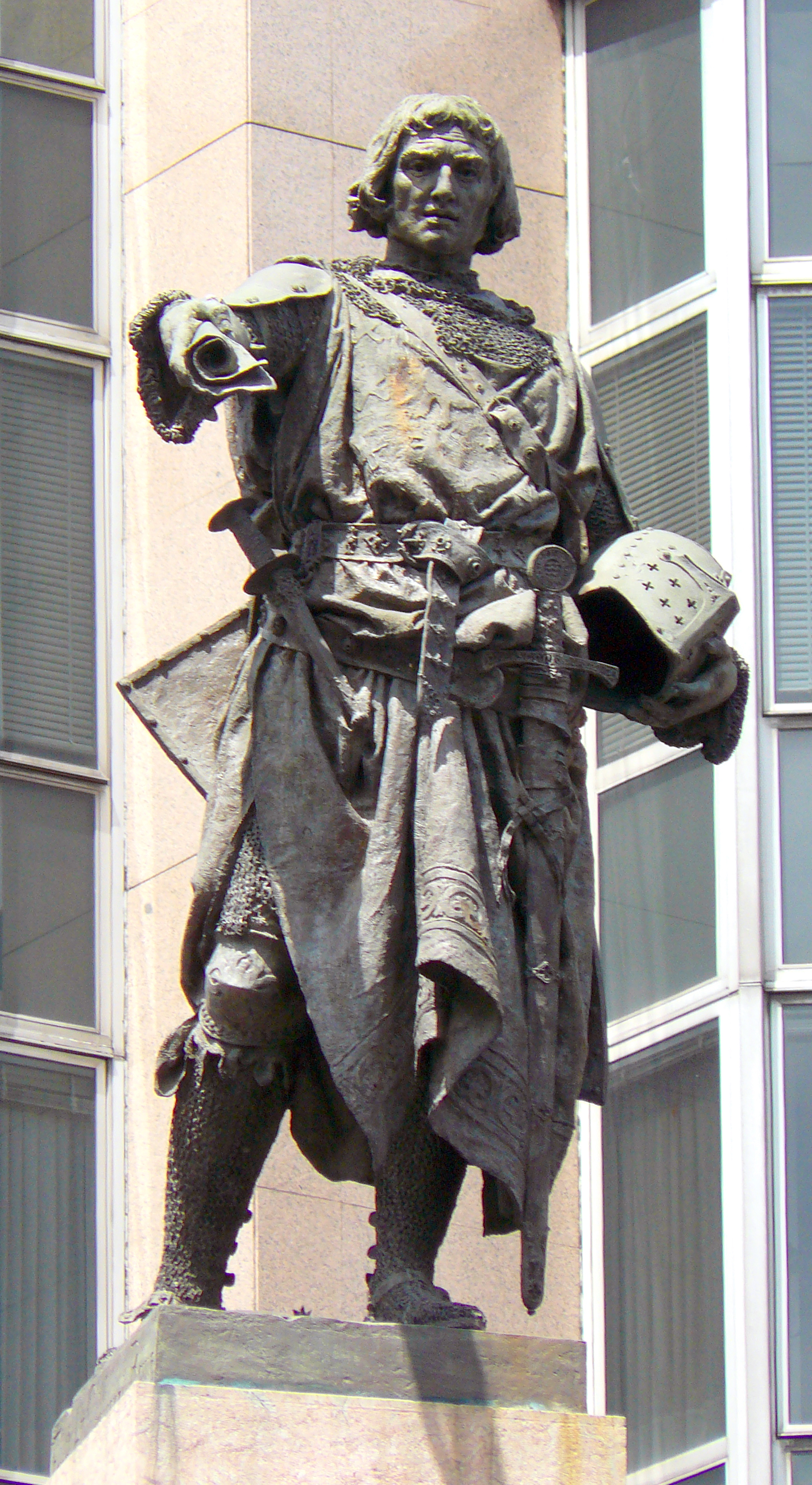
- Statue of Diego Lopez V by Mariano Benlliure.

Lord of Biscay
- Coat of arms
- Reign: 1295–1310
- Predecessor: Henry of Castile
- Successor: María Díaz I de Haro
- Born: c. 1250
- Died: January 1310; Algeciras, Castile
- Buried: Monasterio de San Francisco, Burgos
- Noble family: Haro
- Spouse: Violant of Castile
- Issue among others...: Lope Díaz IV de Haro; Fernando Díaz de Haro
- Father: Diego López III de Haro
- Mother: Constanza de Bearne

Diego López V de Haro, nicknamed el Intruso (c. 1250 – 1310), was a Castilian noble of the House of Haro and held the title of the Lord of Biscay which he took from the pretender to the title, John of Castile.

He further served in the capacity of Mayordomo mayor del rey and the Alférez del rey of Ferdinand IV of Castile. He was a major benefactor of the city of Bilbao, where he expanded the local fishing village and granted it the power to maintain its customs market free of any Portazgo (royal tribute) answerable only to the authority of the Lord of Biscay.

== Family origins ==
Diego López was the son of Diego López III de Haro and his wife, Constanza de Bearne. He eventually inherited the title of Lord of Biscay from his father after his sister and the usurper to the title, John of Castile. His paternal grandparents were Lope Díaz II de Haro, Lord of Biscay, and his wife, Urraca Alfonso de León, the illegitimate daughter of Alfonso IX of León. His maternal grandparents were Guillermo II de Bearne, the Viscount of Bearne, and his wife, Garsenda of Provence.

Amongst his siblings were Lope Díaz III de Haro, Lord of Biscay, Teresa de Haro, wife of Juan Núñez I de Lara, head of the House of Lara, and of Sancha Díaz de Haro. He was the great grandson of the king, Alfonso IX of León.

== Biography ==
=== During the youth of Fernando IV de Castilla (1295–1301) ===
Diego López' exact date of birth is unknown, but it most likely occurred sometime around the year 1250. In 1282, he married the infanta Violant of Castile, daughter of King Alfonso X of Castile.

On 25 April 1295, after the death of King Sancho IV of Castile (who the Haro family had fought to overthrow), Diego López took advantage of the instability in the court of the young King Ferdinand IV of Castile and took power over the Lordship of Biscay which rightfully belonged to his niece, María Díaz I de Haro.

The incessant fighting against the Castilian crown, led primarily by the following infantes; John of Castile, an enemy of the Haro family who claimed the throne as the heir to his brother, Sancho IV of Castile, Infante Henry of Castile, son of Ferdinand III of Castile and uncle of the young king Ferdinand IV, who claimed guardianship over the king. This was exacerbated by the claims of the infantes of Cerda, Ferdinand de la Cerda and Alfonso de la Cerda, who were supported by France, Aragón, and their grandmother, Queen Violant of Aragon, widow of Alfonso X of Castile. Still further, problems also arose with the Kingdom of Aragon, Portugal, and France, who all tried to take advantage of the instability that plagued the contemporary Kingdom of Castile. Finally, internal Castilian players such as Diego López V de Haro, Nuño González de Lara, and Juan Núñez II de Lara, amongst others, sowed confusion and anarchy throughout the kingdom.

During the summer of 1295, after the Cortes of Valladolid of the same year, Diego López was confirmed in his illegitimate possession of the Lordship over Biscay, turned over by the pretender to both Biscay and the Castilian throne, infante John of Castile. During this time, John also temporarily accepted Ferdinand IV as his sovereign and he regained his previous possessions and titles.

On 15 June 1300, Diego López V de Haro converted the fishing village of Bilbao into a town under the authority of the Lords of Biscay.

During the Cortes of Valladolid in 1300, the infante John of Castile officially renounced his pretendership to the throne despite being proclaimed king of León in 1296. He took an oath of fealty ti Ferdinand IV and his successors on 26 June 1300. The same year, María Díaz I de Haro together with her husband (the same infante Juan), as compensation for renouncing her claim over the Lordship of Biscay, received title over Mansilla, Paredes de Nava, Medina de Rioseco, Castronuño, and Cabreros. A short while later, Maria de Molina, and the infantes Henry and John, accompanied by Diego López V de Haro, laid siege to Almazán, but lifted the siege due to opposition from the infante Henry.

=== During the adolescence of Fernando IV de Castilla (1301–1310) ===
In November 1301, Diego López was in the court of the city of Burgos when the papal bull of Pope Boniface VIII made public the marriage of María de Molina (mother of Ferdinand IV) and the dead Sancho IV of Castile. This recognition by the pope, coupled with the coming of age of Ferdinand IV of Castile instantly made the claims to the throne of John of Castile, Henry of Castile, Alfonso de la Cerda, and Ferdinand de la Cerda much less plausible as they had thereby lost one of their principal claims to the throne. Going forward, the crown of Castile and León was much more secure.

The infante Henry, upset over the legitimization of Ferdinand IV by the pope, forged an alliance against the head of the House of Lara, Juan Núñez II de Lara in an effort to alienate Ferdinand IV from his mother, María de Molina. The likewise embittered magnate, John of Castile started his own faction together with Juan Núñez II de Lara in an effort to reclaim the Lordship of Biscay for his wife, María Díaz I de Haro. Later in 1301, the king placated Henry with titles over Atienza and San Esteban de Gormaz as compensation.

In 1302, the rivalry between these two factions became clear with infante Henry, Maria de Molina and Diego Lopez on one side and the infante John of Castile and Juan Núñez II de Lara on the other. The infante Henry threatened the Queen with a declaration of war against her and Ferdinand IV if she did not acquiesce to his demands. This coincided with a fall from grace of Maria de Molina as the contemporary magnates attempted to lessen the grip of power she had maintained over the king. In the final months of 1302, the queen was in Valladolid where she agreed to placate the members of the nobility who threatened her with war against King Ferdinand IV who spent Christmas with John of Castile and Juan Núñez II de Lara in the Kingdom of León.

In 1303, there was a meeting between the King Denis of Portugal and Ferdinand IV where in Ferdinand obtained the return of various territories. The split between the two aforementioned factions continued. In May of that year, celebrations over the success of the meeting (which neither Diego Lopez, Maria de Molina, or Henry of Castile participated in) were held in Badajoz. Further agreement was reached by Ferdinand IV and Denis of Portugal to obtain Portugal's assistance against the opposing faction. Diego Lopez' faction met in Roa with Juan Manuel, Prince of Villena, giving the latter orders to travel to the Kingdom of Aragon and to enlist his support against Ferdinand IV. The group agreed to reunite on the Day of John the Baptist in the municipality of Ariza. Henry of Castile later conveyed this message to Maria de Molina who was in Valladolid at the time. Henry's plan was for Alfonso de la Cerda to become King of León, marrying the infanta Isabel de Castilla y de Molina, daughter of Maria de Molina and sister of Ferdinand IV. At the same time, the infante Pedro de Castilla y Molina, brother of Ferdinand IV, was to be named the King of Castile, marrying one of the daughters of James II of Aragon. Henry claimed that his intention was to foster peace in the kingdom and eliminate the influence of the infante John of Castile and that of Juan Núñez II de Lara.

This plan, which proposed the breakup of the Kingdoms of Castile and León and the forced or obliged resignation of Fernando IV, was rejected by the queen Maria de Molina who refused to meet the rebel faction in Ariza. At the same time, the queen was asked by King Ferdinand IV to help foster a peace between him and the rebel faction. The queen traveled to Ariza where instead of supporting the rebel cause, she pleaded with the group to remember their oaths of fealty to the king and to return to his service causing many of the rebels to abandon the cause of infante Henry and Diego Lopez. This move, which weeded out many of the more moderate rebels, served only to cement the hardline base who vowed to wage war against the king, demanding further that the Kingdoms of Murcia and Jaén be turned over to Alfonso de la Cerda. It was during this time that the infante Henry of Castile became deathly ill and retired to his villa at Roa. Fearing that Henry's possessions would revert to Diego Lopez and Juan Manuel upon his death as was his wish, the queen plotted with Henry's confessor to convince him to leave all his possessions to the crown. This move inevitably failed and Diego Lopez, together with Juan Manuel inherited all his possessions when Henry died on 8 August 1303. He was sepulchered at the now destroyed Monasterio de San Francisco de Valladolid.

In November 1303, the king asked the queen for her support in an effort to end the infighting between infante John of Castile, Lord of Valencia de Campos and Diego Lopez for control over the Lordship of Biscay which at this time was under the full control of Diego Lopez. The queen agreed to help her son and the relationship of mother and son was restored when she succeeded in reaching an agreement with the infante John.

In winter of 1304, the king was in the area of Carrión de los Condes when the infante John once again claimed for his wife the lordship of Biscay together with the continued support of Juan Núñez II de Lara. The king attempted to offer her title over Paredes de Nava and Villalón de Campos as compensation, but this was refused by the infante John. The king then drafted a lopsided deal where Diego Lopez V would turn over his titles over Tordehumos, Íscar and Santa Olalla. He would also be made to give up his possessions in Cuéllar, Córdoba, Murcia, Valdetorio, and his title as Señorío de Valdecorneja. In return for this, Diego would be able to keep Lordship of Biscay, Orduña-Urduña, Balmaseda, las Encartaciones, and Durango. Understandably, the infante John accepted these terms and the king called Diego Lopez to Carrión de los Condes to cement the deal. Not surprisingly, Diego Lopez V refused these demands and threatened an all out rebellion against his rule.

The king, who was at the time preparing for the Treaty of Torrellas, from which Diego Lopez was excluded, promised the infante John that he would receive Biscay after all and that Juan Núñez II de Lara would get La Bureba. He further stated that both could divvy up the territories currently belonging to Diego Lopez in La Rioja if the two could resolve the diplomatic crisis that was ongoing with Aragon.

In April 1304, the infante John commenced negotiations with the Kingdom of Aragon to resolve demands made by Alfonso de la Cerda and disputes held by the Aragon. In the meantime, the king confiscated the territories of Diego Lopez V and of Juan Alfonso de Haro, Señor de los Cameros and divided them up amongst his supporters. After this bold move, many of the rebels came back under the fold of the king.

In winter of 1305, Diego Lopez once again refused the kings demands that he hand over Biscay at Guadalajara.

==== Fighting over possession over the Lordship of Biscay (1305–1307) ====
In 1305, Diego Lopez V was called to present himself in the courts of Medina del Campo which took place that year, to respond to the demands of the king.

At the court, María Díaz I de Haro, Diego's niece and wife of the infante John, demanded the return of her rightful property, the title of Lord of Biscay, a title which Diego had taken in the unrest that surrounded King Ferdinand IV of Castile's younger days on the throne. While the infante John and Maria were presenting their case to the court, Diego Lopez, together with three hundred of his knights arrived at the court and Diego Lopez announced his refusal to give up his title, citing a deal struck in the year 1300 where his niece had renounced her claim. Diego Lopez V left the court without waiting for its final decision and began drafting a proposal soliciting aid from the pope.

It was around this time that Diego Lopez forged a new alliance with Juan Núñez II de Lara who had gotten into disputes with the infante John. Seeing himself in a losing position, the infante John signed a two-year truce with Diego Lopez as he assumed the new alliance between Diego Lopez and the House of Lara would not hold. Trouble came quickly to this relationship as Lope Díaz IV de Haro, Diego Lopez' son and heir entered into a dispute with Juan Núñez II de Lara and he attempted to get his father to accept the kings deal. The same year, Ferdinand IV gave Lope Diaz IV the charge of Mayordomo Mayor of the king. The king called for a meeting with Diego Lopez V, to which Diego Lopez brought along Juan Núñez II in an effort to reconcile the latter with the king, while the king maneuvered to split the powerful duo. The king failed in his efforts and the two rebels left without notifying the king. At the same time, ambassadors from France arrived to solicit an alliance with the kingdom through marriage of Ferdinand IV's sister, the infanta Isabella. .

In April 1306, the infante John, against the advice of Maria de Molina, induced the king to declare war officially against Juan Núñez II de Lara in the knowledge that Diego Lopez would support his ally.

The forces of the king laid siege to Aranda de Duero where Juan Nunez was at the time. Juan immediately broke his oath of vassal to the king. After a series of skirmishes, Juan Nunez managed to escape from the siege while pretending to surrender the city. He moved from there to meet with Diego Lopez and his son, Lope Diaz IV where the three promised to wage war against the king in their respective territories. As most of the kings vassals were unsupportive of the war, costs spiraled as they demanded war preparation funds and made little effort to use the money effectively. The king ordered for the infante John to enter into negotiations with Diego Lopez V, something he agreed to without issue as his vassals were equally unsupportive of the war. The two sent the queen, Maria de Molina to negotiate a peace. Negotiations with the rebels were hosted by Alonso Pérez de Guzmán in the town of Pancorbo. Negotiations with Diego Lopez quickly broke down and he again decided to continue to appeal to the pope.

At the beginning of 1307, while the king, Maria de Molina and the infante John were in Valladolid, they heard news that Pope Clement V renounced the validity of the renunciation over Biscay of 1300. The king drafted a new agreement whereby Diego Lopez V would keep Biscay during the course of his life, but it would revert to María Díaz I de Haro upon his death and would not go to his son, Lope Diaz IV who would instead inherit Orduña-Urduña and Balmaseda, and get Miranda de Ebro and Villalba de Losa from the king. The group convened on the court of Vallalodid to reach a final agreement.

Before the agreement over Biscay was finally reached, Juan Nunez II de Lara left the courts feeling betrayed by the king and his mother. For this reason, the king granted Diego Lopez V the title of Mayordomo Mayor of the king, a move which in turn upset the infante John enough to leave the courts, warning the king that he would no longer be of service to him until the wardens of Diego Lopez' castles paid tribute to his wife (upon Diego Lopez' death according to the agreement). Regardless, the group met again in Lerma where it was agreed that the castles that would go to María Díaz I de Haro would begin to pay her tribute, whilst the castles going to Lope Díaz IV de Haro would do the same for him.

With the reconciliation of Diego Lopez V and of the infante John, the king demanded that Juan Núñez II de Lara leave the Kingdom of Castile and for him to return the castles of Cuenca and Cañete located in the Province of Cuenca that the king had earlier given to him. The king proceeded to Tordehumos in October 1307 where he began to siege the city together with the infante John, his son, Alfonso de Valencia, and the Grand Master of the Order of Santiago, Juan Osórez. It was around the same time that the king also received a papal order to take all the possessions of the Knights Templar into his possession. Added to other complications, King Ferdinand IV decided to reach a peace treaty with Juan Núñez II de Lara where Lara agreed to turn all his territories over to the king minus those in La Bureba and La Rioja.

After the siege and the peace agreement, many nobles, sensing an opportunity to grab power, attempted to create new friction between Lara, the infante John and the king. Convinced that the king wanted them both dead, Juan Nunez II and the infante Juan forged a new alliance together without attempting to reach out to Diego Lopez V. Despite assurances from the king to the contrary, this edgy conflict bubbled until 1309 when the king called a conference at the courts of Madrid (the first of its kind actually held in the capital).

Present at this conference were all the major players left alive from the previous infighting. The king announced his intention to wage war against the Kingdom of Granada due to growing pressure to expand from his nobles.

==== The Conquest of Gibraltar and the Siege of Algeciras (1309) ====
Amongst the nobles that took part in the action were a majority of the nobles from the previous civil strife from both sides. These included Diego Lopez V de Haro, the infante John of Castile, Juan Núñez II de Lara, Alonso Pérez de Guzmán, Fernán Ruiz de Saldaña, Juan Manuel, Prince of Villena and many other magnates from Castile. The Castilian forces were made up of the militias of the towns of Salamanca, Segovia, Seville, and many other cities. King Denis of Portugal also sent 700 knights under Martín Gil de Sousa, Alférez of the king of Portugal. Furthermore, a great deal of knights from the orders of Santiago Calatrava were also present. Pope Clement V granted King Ferdinand IV a tenth of all taxes and rents collected by the church for a period of three years. This edict was passed by papal bull on 28 April 1309 from the city of Avignon.

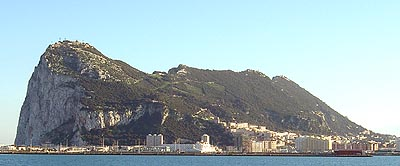
The Rock of Gibraltar, which was taken by Fernando IV on 12 September 1309.

King Ferdinand IV of Castile set up his headquarters in the city of Seville where emissaries of king James II of Aragon announced their readiness to commence operations against the city of Almería. Ferdinand IV in turn decided to lay siege to the city of Algeciras which had been the main Muslim stronghold on the Iberian Peninsula for many years. Diego Lopez, amongst others opposed this plan and advocated unsuccessfully for an attack on Gibraltar. This was possibly due in part to the fact that the city had been unsuccessfully besieged in the past, most notably at the Siege of Algeciras (1278). Nevertheless, the Castilian-Leonese army gathered in the city and was transferred over the Guadalquivir River towards Algeciras.

The vanguard of Ferdinand's army reached the city walls on 27 July 1309, followed three days later by the last of the Christian forces which included the king Ferdinand and his entourage. The other prong of attack led by James II of Aragon began its siege of Almería on 15 August of the same year. With the siege of Algeciras ongoing, Gibraltar fell to the forces of Ferdinand under the control of Juan Núñez II de Lara, Archbishop of Seville, Fernando Gutiérrez Tello and the Grand Master of the Order of Calatrava on 12 September 1309.

In mid October 1309, the infante John of Castile, his son, Alfonso, Juan Manual, and Fernán Ruiz de Saldaña deserted the Castilian encampment at Algeciras together with about fifty other knights. The action, which was due in part because Ferdinand IV owed them a great deal of money, provoked the indignation of the European monarchs and the protest of James II of Aragon who tried to persuade the deserters unsuccessfully to return to Algeciras. Nevertheless, King Ferdinand IV maintained the support of Juan Núñez II de Lara and of Diego Lopez de Haro and continued to try and take the city.

Disease and generally poor conditions became so bad in the Christian camp that Ferdinand IV was forced to pawn the jewels and crowns of his wife, Constance of Portugal to pay his soldiers and knights. A short time later, the troops of Felipe de Castilla y Molina, brother of Ferdinand IV, arrived in the Christian camp accompanied by 400 knights and many footsoldiers under the command of the Archbishop of Santiago de Compostela.

Towards the end of 1309, Diego Lopez V became sick as the result of an attack of gout, from which he would later die in Christian camp on the River Andarax. After months of failed attempts to take the city, Ferdinand IV decided to negotiate a peace with the Kingdom of Granada who had sent their emissary to the camp. They reached a deal where Ferdinand would lift the siege in return for 50,000 gold pieces and the towns of Quesada and Bedmar.

== Death and legacy ==
Diego Lopez V de Haro died in winter of 1310 in the camp at Algeciras. His niece, María Díaz I de Haro, wife of the infante John of Castile, Lord of Valencia de Campos, took possession of the Lordship of Biscay. Further, the infante John returned the villas of Paredes de Nava, Cabreros, Medina de Rioseco, Castronuño and Mansilla to the king.

After his death during the siege of Algeciras, his body was taken to the city of Burgos where he was sepulchered at the now destroyed Monasterio de San Francisco de Burgos. It was the same place where his previous wife, the infanta Violante of Castile was also buried.

== Marriage and descendants ==
Diego López V de Haro married the infanta Violant of Castile, together they were the parents of:

- Lope Díaz IV de Haro (1285–1322). Señor of Orduña and Balmaseda and Alférez of the king, Ferdinand IV of Castile. Died without descendants.
- Fernando Díaz de Haro. Señor of Orduña and Valmaseda after the death of his brother. Married in 1315 with Maria of Portugal, Lady of Meneses and Orduña, daughter of the infante Alfonso de Portugal and his wife, Violante Manuel, sister of Juan Manuel, Prince of Villena.
- Pedro López de Haro, who died in infancy.
- María Díaz de Haro. Lady of Tordehumos. Married Juan Núñez II de Lara, Lord of Lara and Albarracín.

== See also ==
- House of Haro
- Lords of Biscay
- María Díaz I de Haro
- Juan Núñez II de Lara

== Bibliography ==
- Del Arco y Garay, Ricardo; Ricardo del Arco y Garay (1954). Sepulcros de la Casa Real de Castilla. Madrid: Instituto Jerónimo Zurita. Consejo Superior de Investigaciones Científicas.
- Benavides, Antonio (1860). Memorias de Don Fernando IV de Castilla. Madrid: Imprenta de Don José Rodríguez.
- Gaibrois Riaño de Ballesteros, Mercedes; Mercedes Ballesteros Gaibrois (1922–1928). Revista de achivos, bibliotecas y museos (ed.). Historia del reinado de Sancho IV de Castilla. Madrid: Editorial Voluntad. 5332259.
- González Mínguez, César; César González Mínguez (1995). Fernando IV, 1295–1312. Palencia: La Olmeda. ISBN 84-8173-027-0.
- De Loaysa, Jofré; García Martínez, Antonio (1982). Crónicas de los Reyes de Castilla Fernando III, Alfonso X, Sancho IV y Fernando IV (1248–1305). latín y castellano (2nd ed.). Murcia: Academia Alfonso X el Sabio. ISBN 84-00-05017-7.
- Rodríguez García, Francisco (2002). Crónica del Señorío de Vizcaya. Editorial Maxtor Librería. ISBN 84-9761-029-6.
- de Salazar y Acha, Jaime (2000). La casa del Rey de Castilla y León en la Edad Media. Madrid: Centro de Estudios Políticos y Constitucionales. ISBN 84-259-1128-1.
- de Salazar y Castro, Luis; Luis de Salazar y Castro (1697). Mateo de Llanos y Guzman (ed.). Historia genealógica de la Casa de Lara. Vol. 3. Madrid.

Preceded by Henry of Castile	Lord of Biscay; 1295–1310	Succeeded by María Díaz I de Haro
Preceded by Juan Núñez II de Lara	Mayordomo Mayor of the King; 1307–1309	Succeeded by Juan Núñez II de Lara
Preceded by John of Castile	Alférez del rey 1284–1284	Succeeded by Alfonso Téllez de Molina
Preceded by Nuño González de Lara	Alférez del rey 1296–1309	Succeeded by Lope Díaz IV de Haro
