= María Díaz I de Haro =

Spanish noblewoman

Arms of the House of Haro.

María Díaz I de Haro "the Good" (1270–1342) was a Spanish noblewoman of the House of Haro. She was the daughter of Lope Díaz III de Haro who was assassinated by order of the king at Alfaro, La Rioja. She is best known for being the Lady of Biscay and for her lifelong battle against her uncle, Diego López V de Haro, for the title of the lordship of Biscay.

== Family Origins ==
Maria was the daughter of Lope Díaz III de Haro and, Juana Alfonso de Molina. She inherited the title of Lord of Biscay from her brother Diego López de Haro IV upon his death in 1288, which passed briefly to her husband, John of Castile and which was later taken from her by her uncle, Diego López V de Haro during the unrest following the death of Sancho IV of Castile and the rise to power of his young son, Ferdinand IV of Castile. Her paternal grandparents were Diego López III de Haro and Constanza de Bearne.

Maria's brother was Diego López IV de Haro. She was the great granddaughter of the king, Alfonso IX of León.

== Biography ==
=== First tenure as Lady of Biscay ===
In 1287, Maria married John of Castile. On June 8, 1288, her father was assassinated in Alfaro by order of King Sancho IV of Castile over a deep seated disagreement between the two parties. Maria's husband, John, who was also the brother of Sancho IV and one of the infantes of the Kingdom of Castile, was also present during the episode and was thrown in prison for his role in the affair.

The title over Biscay passed down to Diego López IV de Haro, the firstborn son of Lope Diaz III, who was involved in his own disputes with supporters of the new King, Ferdinand IV of Castile, and with John of Castile. These disputes were due to his support of the infante Alfonso de la Cerda (Second son of Sancho IV) as King of Castile while others still supported the infante Sancho.

This initial period as Lady of Biscay lasted from 1289 until 1295.

=== Usurpation of her title by Diego Lopez V de Haro ===
On 25 April 1295, King Sancho IV of Castile died and was succeeded to the throne of Castile by his son Ferdinand IV of Castile who was only 9 years old at the time. This led to a long period of instability in the kingdom and within the Castilian court. Throughout this period, the kingdom was ruled de facto by María de Molina, the mother and regent of the young Ferdinand IV. The fragile situation was exploited by Maria's uncle, Diego López V de Haro with the support of James II of Aragon who occupied Biscay and claimed the lordship for himself, stealing it from Maria and her husband, John of Castile.

Diego Lopez V found almost no opposition to his initial takeover of Biscay in large part due to the fact that Maria's husband, the infante John of Castile, was in prison for offenses related with her father's cause against Sancho IV. For his conquest of Biscay, Diego Lopez V was forever nicknamed the intrusive.

Once freed from prison, John of Castile immediately set to work attempting to regain control over Biscay. He was initially unsuccessful and joined together with other dissatisfied parties in the kingdom to fight against the queen regent, María de Molina, and her defendant, Diego López V de Haro the intrusive.

Eventually, John and Maria were able to successfully gain a claim of legal title to the Lordship of Biscay from the Pope. In 1307, during a general meeting of the court of Biscay, Diego the intrusive was obliged to recognize Maria as the legal heiress to the lordship and asked her to accept the title to be conferred after his death, an event which occurred in 1309.

=== Second tenure as Lady of Biscay ===
In early 1300, Diego López V de Haro founded the city of Bilbao. He died in service to King Ferdinand IV at the Siege of Algeciras in 1309 during a campaign against the Kingdom of Granada.

When she first came to power over Biscay, Maria was instantly involved in a power struggle with her cousin, Lope Díaz IV de Haro, son of Diego Lopez V the intrusive. Lope Diaz IV counted on the support of King Ferdinand IV whom his father had served faithfully and on the fact that the king's uncle and Maria's husband, John of Castile, continuously became entangled in disputes with the crown.

Lope Diaz IV was ultimately unsuccessful in his efforts to deprive Maria of her seat due in large part to intervention at the Castilian court by the Queen mother Maria de Molina who did not want to see another power struggle over Biscay. As a result, Maria Diaz I remained in her capacity as Lady of Biscay and head of the House of Haro.

In 1312, King Ferdinand IV died leaving the infante John, Maria's husband, tutor of the infante Pedro de Castilla and governor of Castile. John attempted to take the city of Granada but failed in his efforts. The Castilian forces were obliged to retreat some 15 kilometers from the city at Cerro de los Infantes, Pinos Puente. During this conflict, the infante Pedro Sanchez was killed along with John of Castile (26 June 1319).

During her reign over Biscay, the cards legitimizing the foundation of Bilbao were ratified in 1310. Maria founded the towns of Portugalete (1322), Lekeitio (1325) and Ondarroa (1327).

In 1322, she founded the Dominican convent at Valencia de Don Juan, taking up residency at Perales where she retired the same year, leaving the title of Lord of Biscay to her son, Juan de Haro the one-eyed. Her second tenure as Lady of Biscay lasted from 1310 to 1322.

=== Assassination of Juan de Haro ===
Juan de Haro sought to expand the influence of the lordship of Biscay, contracting marriage with the niece of the king of Aragon. Don Juan Manuel, feeling threatened by the boldness of Juan's actions, took his grievances to King Alfonso XI of Castile who ordered Juan's assassination. Maria was forced to come out of retirement and retake the title over Biscay.

=== Third tenure as Lady of Biscay ===
Immediately following the assassination of Maria's son, Juan, King Alfonso XI attempted to buy the rights over the Lordship of Biscay but was unsuccessful in his attempts as an angered Maria refused to relinquish power. In 1334, she abdicated a second time, this time in favor of her granddaughter, María Díaz II de Haro, daughter of her son Juan de Haro and his wife, Isabel de Portugal y Manuel. The young Maria Diaz II would go on to marry Juan Núñez III de Lara and the two would govern Biscay in the name of Maria Diaz II.

This third and final term as Lady of Biscay lasted from 1326 to 1334.

== Death and legacy ==
María I Díaz de Haro died on 3 October 1342 of old age.

Maria continuously fought for the interests of Biscay including entering into several disputes with the crown of Castile. She is remembered in history as having contributed greatly to the development of Biscay, gaining the nickname the good. Together with Maria de Molina, she was known as one of the most notable and accomplished political women of her time.

== Marriage and Descendants ==
From her marriage with John of Castile, the following children were born:

- Juan de Haro (b. ? - d. 1326) - Inherited all the possessions of his mother and father, married Isabel de Portugal y Manuel, daughter of the infante Alfonso of Portugal and granddaughter of King Alfonso III of Portugal. Assassinated in Toro in 1326 by order of King Alfonso XI of Castile.
- Lope Díaz de Haro (b. - d. 1295) - Died during his childhood.
- María Díaz de Haro (b. - d. 1299) - Married Juan Núñez II de Lara el Menor, head of the House of Lara who would go on to marry the daughter of Diego Lopez V de Haro, María. Died without leaving descendants.

Preceded by Diego López IV de Haro	Lady of Biscay; First time 1289–1295	Succeeded by Diego López V de Haro
Preceded by Diego López V de Haro	Lady of Biscay; Second time 1310–1322	Succeeded by Juan Yáñez de Castilla y Haro
Preceded by Juan Yáñez de Castilla y Haro	Lady of Biscay; Third time 1326–1334	Succeeded by Alfonso XI of Castile (less than a year); María Díaz II de Haro

== See also ==
- House of Haro
- House of Lara
- Diego Lopez V de Haro
- Juan Núñez II de Lara
- Ferdinand IV of Castile
- Alfonso XI of Castile
- Don Juan Manuel
- Lord of Biscay
