= Juan de Castilla y Haro =

Spanish noble

- Lord of Cuéllar and Biscay
- Arms of the House of Haro
- Died: 1 November 1326; Toro, Zamora
- Noble family: Castilian House of Ivrea
- Spouse: Isabel of Portugal
- Issue: María Díaz II de Haro
- Father: John of Castile
- Mother: María Díaz I de Haro

Juan de Castilla y Haro, most commonly known as Juan el Tuerto (the one-eyed) (b. ? - d. 1 November 1326, Toro), was a Spanish noble of the House of Haro and of the royal line of the Kingdom of Castile descended from Alfonso X of Castile. He was the Lord of Cuéllar from 1319 to 1325 and the Lord of Biscay from 1322 until his assassination by order of King Alfonso XI of Castile in 1326.

== Family Origins ==
He was the son and heir of María Díaz I de Haro, from whom he inherited the Lordship of Biscay, and her husband the infante John of Castile. His paternal grandfather was King Alfonso X of Castile and his maternal grandfather was Diego López III de Haro.

== Marriage and Descendants ==
Juan married Isabel of Portugal, Lady of Penela, the daughter of Infante Afonso of Portugal, son of King Afonso III of Portugal, and his wife Violante Manuel, the daughter of Infante Manuel of Castile. This marriage produced the following children:

- María Díaz II de Haro- would go on to inherit the Lordship of Biscay from her grandmother María Díaz I de Haro. She married Juan Núñez III de Lara, the head of the House of Lara, son of the infante Ferdinand de la Cerda and great-grandson of Alfonso X.

== Political intrigues ==
The chronicle of the reign of Alfonso XI of Castile describes the minority of the young king as a time of violence and social tension, when knights and powerful lords robbed and oppressed those weaker than them. In 1325, the fourteen year old king announced his intention to rule in his own right, without the aid of the regents who had exploited their time in control. Many of his subjects had fled to nearby kingdoms to avoid the turmoil. All hoped the king would restore order. Among the princes prepared to oppose the king militarily if necessary was el Tuerto.

== Death ==
Juan el Tuerto was lured to Toro with the prospect of a pardon and reconciliation with King Alfonso. On 1 November 1326, the king ordered the murder of el Tuerto and two of his knights, then summoned the nobles to the square to hear an account of the infante's treasonable conduct.

== See also ==
- House of Haro
- María Díaz I de Haro
- House of Lara
- Lord of Biscay

| Preceded by María Díaz I de Haro | Lord of Biscay; 1322–1326 | Succeeded by María Díaz I de Haro |
