= Lope Díaz III de Haro =

Spanish noble

Lope Díaz III de Haro (b. ? – d. June 8, 1288, Alfaro) was a Spanish noble and head of the House of Haro. He was the 8th Lord of Biscay, a post which he gained by hereditary means after the death of his father. He held that title from 1254 until his own death in 1288 when he died attempting to assassinate the King of Castile.

== Family origins ==
He was son of Diego López III de Haro and Constance of Béarn. His maternal grandparents were the Viscount William II of Béarn and his wife, Garsenda, Countess of Forcalquier. His paternal grandparents were Lope Díaz II de Haro, also Lord of Biscay, and of Urraca Alfonso de León, the illegitimate daughter of King Alfonso IX of León. Lope was the oldest of 5 siblings which included Teresa de Haro, who merged the Haro family with the House of Lara, and Diego López V de Haro who died during the Siege of Algeciras in 1310.

== Biography ==
Lope took possession of the title of Lord of Biscay while still a minor after the death of his father. Due to the unnatural way in which his father died and the fact that his father had actively supported the overthrow of Alfonso X of Castile and had sworn allegiance to the King of Navarre, Lope's tutors brought the boy to Estella-Lizarra where he too offered his services to the Navarese King.

After long, Lope was reconciled with Alfonso X who reinstated Lope as Lord of Haro, a privilege his father had lost the family. Lope entered the service of the Prince, Fernando de la Cerda, the eldest son and heir of King Alfonso X. Fernando however ended up dying in 1275, before his father throwing into question his line of succession. Disputes arose between two family members; Prince Fernando's young son, Alfonso de la Cerda and his uncle, Prince Fernando's younger brother, Sancho de Castilla who began jockeying for power and influence to see if he would gain power over the succession of the Castilian crown. Lope decided to throw his support behind Sancho which turned out to be a savvy move.

On April 4, 1284, Alfonso X of Castile died and Sancho IV of Castile was named King of Castile. Sancho IV was married to María de Molina who was the sister of Don Lope Diaz' wife. This good fortune made Lope a very powerful man, earning the Lord of Biscay the additional titles of Mayordomo Real of the Kingdom, Caniller y Alférez Mayor, and was given title of all the land from Burgos to Cantabria. In 1287, he was the regent of the Kingdom of Castile along with the Bishop of Astorga.

== Death ==
Before long, the other nobles of Castile became envious of Lope's enormous power and began to take their issues up with the King. Things came to the breaking point on June 8, 1288, in a town in La Rioja called Alfaro. In a meeting with King Sancho IV, Lope Díaz III de Haro got in an argument with Juan Alfonso López de Haro I, a noble of the same House of Haro who held the title of Señorío de Cameros. The argument allegedly resulted in Lope pulling out a knife and threatening the life of the King where after he was executed. The Spanish text of the incident from author Claudio Sánchez-Albornoz y Menduiña is as follows.

... el Conde se levantó mucho asina e dijo: ¿Presos? ¿Cómo? ¡A la merda! ¡Oh, los míos! e metió mano a un cuchillo e dejóse ir para la puerta donde estaba el Rey el cuchillo sacado e la mano alta... ballesteros e caballeros, veyendo que el Conde iva contra el Rey, firieron al Conde, e diéronle con una espada en la mano, e cortáronsela, e cayó luego la mano en tierra con el cuchillo; e luego diéronle con una maza en la cabeza, que cayó en tierra muerto.

— Crónica del reinado de Sancho IV el Bravo. Claudio Sánchez-Albornoz y Menduiña

== Marriage and descendants ==
He married Juana Alfonso de Molina, daughter of Alfonso of Molina, niece of the King Alfonso IX of León, and sister of the wife of King Sancho IV of Castile. He married Juana without the consent of the king which was considered a great affront at the time. The wedding took place at the Monasterio de Santa María y San Andrés and the following marriage brought two children:

- Diego López IV de Haro (born ?, died 1289), who succeeded his father as Lord of Biscay and as head of the House of Haro. After his death, there was a struggle over the succession of the Lordship of Biscay between Diego's paternal uncle, Diego López V de Haro, and his sister, María Díaz I de Haro who was supported by her husband and King Alfonso X.
- María Díaz I de Haro (born c. 1274, died 1342), Married Juan de Castilla, son of Alfonso X of Castile, the King of Castile and León. She became the Señora de Vizcaya or Lady of Biscay in 1310, after the death of her paternal uncle Diego López V de Haro, with whom she had been fighting for the title. Diego V was successful in his attempts to capture the lordship after the death of Diego López IV de Haro. Maria was the mother of Juan de Haro 'el Tuerto' who was assassinated in Toro in 1326 by order of the King Alfonso XI of Castile.

== Bibliography ==
- Mercedes, Gaibrois Riaño de Ballesteros; Colección Vidas Memorables (1936). María de Molina, tres veces reina. Madrid: Editorial Espasa-Calpe S.A.
- Mercedes, Gaibrois Riaño de Ballesteros (1967). María de Molina, tres veces reina. Madrid: Espasa-Calpe.
- Arturo, García de la Fuente (1935). Los Castigos e documentos del rey don Sancho IV el Bravo. Estudio preliminar de una edición crítica de esta obra. San Lorenzo del Escorial (Madrid).
- González-Doria, Fernando (2000). Diccionario heráldico y nobiliario de los Reinos de España. San Fernando de Henares (Madrid): Ediciones Trigo S. L. ISBN 84-89787-17-4.
- González Jiménez, Manuel (October 2004). Alfonso X el Sabio. Barcelona: Editorial Ariel S. A. ISBN 84-344-6758-5.
- Ibáñez de Segovia Peralta y Mendoza, Gaspar (1777). Memorias históricas del Rei D. Alonso el Sabio i observaciones a su chrónica. Madrid: Joachin Ibarra.
- De Loaysa, Jofré; García Martínez, Antonio (1982). Crónicas de los Reyes de Castilla Fernando III, Alfonso X, Sancho IV y Fernando IV (1248-1305) (in Latin and Spanish) (2nd ed.). Murcia: Academia Alfonso X el Sabio. ISBN 84-00-05017-7.
- Novia de Salcedo, Pedro (1851). Defensa histórica, legislativa y económica del señorío de Vizcaya y provincias de Alava y Guipúzcoa. Volumen II. Bilbao: Librería de Delmas e Hijo.
- Menéndez Pidal de Navascués, Faustino (1982). Heráldica medieval española. Vol. I: La Casa Real de Castilla y León. Hidalguía. ISBN 84-00-05150-5.
- Haro. Catálogo Artístico y Bibliográfico. Haro: Asociación Cultural Manuel Bartolomé Cossío. 1994. 84-605-0961-3.
- Rodríguez García, Francisco (2002). Crónica del Señorío de Vizcaya. Editorial Maxtor Librería. ISBN 84-9761-029-6.
- Del Valle Curieses, Rafael (2000). María de Molina: el soberano ejercicio de la concordia: (1260-1321). Madrid: Alderabán. ISBN 84-95414-03-1.

== See also ==
- House of Haro
- Lords of Biscay

Preceded by Diego López III de Haro	Lord of Biscay; 1254–1288	Succeeded by Diego López IV de Haro
