= Afonso of Portugal =

Afonso of Portugal is the name of:

== Kings ==
- Afonso I Henriques (1109–1185), King of Portugal from 1139 to 1185
- Afonso II of Portugal (1185–1223), King of Portugal from 1212 to 1223
- Afonso III of Portugal (1210–1279), King of Portugal from 1248 to 1279
- Afonso IV of Portugal (1291–1357), King of Portugal from 1325 to 1357
- Afonso V of Portugal (1432–1481), King of Portugal from 1438 to 1481
- Afonso VI of Portugal (1643–1683), King of Portugal from 1656 to 1683

== Princes and infantes ==
- Afonso of Portugal, Lord of Portalegre (1263–1312), son of Afonso III of Portugal
- Afonso of Portugal, Lord of Leiria (c. 1288–c. 1300), Portuguese noble
- Afonso (1315–1315), son of Afonso IV
- Afonso (?–?; 14th century), son of Peter I of Portugal
- Afonso (1371 or 1382–1371 or 1382), son of Ferdinand I of Portugal
- Afonso, Duke of Braganza (1377–1461), natural son of John I of Portugal
- Afonso (1390–1390), son of John I of Portugal
- Afonso, Prince of Portugal (1475–1491), son of John II of Portugal
- Infante Cardinal Afonso of Portugal (1509–1540), son of Manuel I of Portugal
- Afonso, Prince of Portugal (1526) (1526–1526), son of John III of Portugal
- Infante Afonso, Duke of Porto (1865–1920), son of Luís I of Portugal

== Others ==
- Afonso of Portugal (bishop) (1440–1522), 43rd Bishop of Évora
