= Maria of Portugal =

Maria of Portugal is the name of several Portuguese queens, queens consort, princesses and infantas, some of whom reigned as Queen of Spain or other lands:

== Queens ==
- Maria I of Portugal (1734–1816), reigned 1777 to 1816
- Maria II of Portugal (1819–1853), reigned 1826 to 1853

== Queens consort ==
- Maria of Aragon (1482–1517), second wife of Manuel I of Portugal
- Maria Francisca of Savoy (1646–1683), wife of both Afonso VI and Peter II of Portugal
- Maria Sofia of Neuburg (1666–1699), wife of Peter II of Portugal
- Maria Anna of Austria (1683–1754), wife of John V of Portugal
- Maria Leopoldina of Austria (1797–1826), wife of Peter IV of Portugal, I of Brazil
- Maria Pia of Savoy (1847–1911), wife of Louis of Portugal

== Infanta and Princesses ==
- Infanta Maria of Portugal and Flanders (1227 or aft. – aft. 1235), daughter of Ferdinand, Count of Flanders and betrothed of Robert I, Count of Artois
- Maria of Portugal, Lady of Meneses and Orduña (1290–?), daughter of Afonso of Portugal, Lord of Portalegre, wife of Tello Alfonso de Meneses and of Fernando Díaz de Haro
- Infanta Maria of Portugal, Queen of Castile (1313–1357), daughter of Afonso IV of Portugal, queen consort of Castile as wife of Alfonso XI of Castile
- Infanta Maria of Portugal, Marchioness of Tortosa (1342–1377), daughter of Peter I of Portugal, wife of Ferdinand, Marquess of Tortosa
- Infanta Maria Brites, 2nd Lady of Valencia de Campos (born 1381), daughter of Infante John, Duke of Valencia de Campos, wife of Martim Vasques da Cunha
- Infanta Maria of Portugal (1432–1432), daughter of Edward of Portugal
- Infanta Maria of Portugal (1511–1513), daughter of Manuel I of Portugal and Maria of Aragon
- Infanta Maria of Portugal, Duchess of Viseu (1521–1577), also the daughter of Manuel I of Portugal and Eleanor of Austria
- Maria Manuela, Princess of Portugal (1527–1545), daughter of John III of Portugal, wife of Philip, Prince of Asturias (future Philip II of Spain)
- Infanta Maria of Guimarães (1538–1577), daughter of Infante Edward, 4th Duke of Guimarães, wife of Alexander Farnese, Duke of Parma
- Infanta Maria Anna of Spain (1606–1646), daughter of Philip II of Portugal, III of Spain, wife of Ferdinand III, Holy Roman Emperor

Daughters of Philip III of Portugal

- Infanta Maria Margarita (1621–1621), died young
- Infanta Maria Eugenia (1625–1627), died young
- Infanta Maria Ana Antónia of Spain (1636–1636), died young
- Maria Theresa of Spain (1638–1683), queen consort of France as wife of Louis XIV of France
- Infanta Maria Ambrosia de la Concepción (1655–1655), died young

Daughters of John V of Portugal

- Infanta Maria Barbara of Portugal (1711–1758), queen consort of Spain as wife of Ferdinand VI of Spain

Daughters of Joseph I of Portugal

- Infanta Maria Ana Francisca Josefa of Portugal (1736–1813)
- Infanta Maria Francisca Doroteia of Portugal (1739–1771)

Daughters of Maria I and Peter III of Portugal

- Infanta Maria Isabel of Portugal (1766–1777)
- Infanta Mariana of Portugal (1768–1788), wife of Infante Gabriel of Spain
- Infanta Maria Clementina of Portugal (1774–1776)

Daughters of John VI of Portugal

- Maria Teresa, Princess of Beira (1793–1874), wife of Infante Pedro Carlos of Spain and Portugal and then of Infante Carlos of Spain
- Maria Isabel of Portugal (1797–1818), queen consort of Spain as wife of Ferdinand VII of Spain
- Infanta Maria Francisca of Portugal (1800–1834), married Infante Carlos of Spain
- Infanta Maria da Assunção of Portugal (1805–1834)

Daughters of Maria II and Ferdinand II of Portugal

- Infanta Maria of Portugal (1840–1840)
- Infanta Maria Anna of Portugal (1843–1884), wife of George, Crown Prince of Saxony
- Infanta Maria da Glória of Portugal (1851–1851)

Daughters of Miguel of Portugal

- Infanta Maria das Neves of Portugal (1852–1941), Duchess of San Jaime as wife of Alfonso Carlos, Duke of San Jaime
- Infanta Maria Theresa of Portugal (1855–1944), Archduchess of Austria as wife of Archduke Carl Ludwig of Austria
- Infanta Maria Josepha of Portugal (1857–1943), Duchess in Bavaria as wife of Carl Theodor, Duke in Bavaria
- Infanta Marie Anne of Portugal (1861–1942), Grand Duchess consort of Luxembourg as wife of Guillaume IV, Grand Duke of Luxembourg
- Infanta Maria Antonia of Portugal (1862–1959), Duchess of Parma as wife of Robert I, Duke of Parma
- Infanta Maria Ana of Portugal (1888), daughter of Carlos I of Portugal
