= Maria of Portugal, Lady of Meneses and Orduña =

Portuguese royal

Maria of Portugal (born c. 1290; Portuguese pronunciation: [mɐˈɾiɐ]) was a Portuguese royal, daughter of Infante Afonso of Portugal and his wife Violante Manuel.

Believed to be born in the year 1290, she was the eldest daughter of the Infante Afonso of Portugal and his wife Violante Manuel. She was the paternal granddaughter of King Afonso III of Portugal and his wife, Queen Beatrice of Castile, daughter of Alfonso X of Castile. Her maternal grandparents were Infante Manuel of Castile, son of Ferdinand III of Castile, and his wife Constance of Aragon, Lady of Villena, daughter of James I of Aragon.

Her date of death is unknown.

Maria married firstly to Tello Alfonso de Meneses, Lord of Meneses, son of Alfonso Téllez de Molina and the grandson of Alfonso of Molina. The couple had two children:

- Alfonso Téllez de Meneses. On the death of his father, he became lord of Meneses, Tiedra, Montealegre, Grajal de Campos, Alba de Liste, San Román and Villagarcía de Campos. He died young and his possessions were inherited by his sister.
- Isabel Téllez de Meneses. On the death of her brother, she inherited his titles. She married João Afonso de Albuquerque, Lord of Alburquerque and Villalba de los Alcores.

She became a widow after her husband died in 1315; she remarried to Fernando Díaz de Haro, Lord of Orduña and Balmaseda, the second son of Diego López V de Haro. This marriage bore two sons:

- Diego López de Haro, who inherited his father's titles over Orduña and Balmaseda, possibly the last Haro to hold them. Married Juana de Castro, the daughter of Pedro Fernández de Castro, lord of Sarria and Lemos, and his wife, Isabel Ponce de León.
- Pedro López de Haro, who died early.
