= Agúndez =

Agúndez is a surname. Notable people with the surname include:

- Daniel Alonso Agúndez (born 2001), better known as YoSoyPlex, Spanish YouTuber
- Gabriela Agúndez (born 2000), Mexican diver
- Narciso Agúndez Montaño (born 1958), Mexican politician
