= Maria Ana of Portugal =

Maria Ana of Portugal may refer to:

- Mariana Victoria of Spain (1718–1781), queen consort of Joseph I of Portugal
- Infanta Mariana Victoria of Portugal (1768–1788), daughter of Mary I of Portugal and Peter III of Portugal, wife of Infante Gabriel of Spain
- Infanta Maria Anna of Portugal (1843–1884), daughter of Maria II of Portugal and Ferdinand II of Portugal, wife of George of Saxony
- Infanta Marie Anne of Portugal (1861–1942), titular infanta of Portugal, daughter of the usurper-king Miguel I of Portugal, wife of Guillaume IV, Grand Duke of Luxembourg

== See also ==
- Maria of Portugal (disambiguation)
