= Constance of Aragon, Lady of Villena =

Constance of Aragon
- Lady of Villena
- Born: 1239
- Died: 1269 (aged 29–30)
- Spouse: Manuel of Castile
- Issue: Violante Manuel
- House: Barcelona
- Father: James I of Aragon
- Mother: Yolanda of Hungary

Constance of Aragon (1239–1269) was a daughter of James I of Aragon and his second wife Yolanda of Hungary. She was a member of the House of Barcelona and was Infanta of Castile by her marriage to Manuel of Castile.

Her maternal grandparents were Andrew II of Hungary and his second wife Yolanda de Courtenay. Her paternal grandparents were Peter II of Aragon and Marie of Montpellier. Constance's siblings included: James II of Majorca, Peter III of Aragon, Yolanda, Queen of Castile and Isabella, Queen of France.

In 1260 and in Soria, Constance married Infante Manuel of Castile, the second son of Ferdinand III and his first wife Elisabeth of Hohenstaufen. The couple had at least two children:

- Alfonso Manuel (born 1260/1261, died in Montpellier, France in 1276) Died without issue.
- Violante Manuel (born 1265, died in Lisbon, Portugal in 1314), lady of Elche and Medellín. Married circa 1287 to Afonso of Portugal, son of Afonso III of Portugal.

Constance died in 1269.
