= Pedro Fernández de Castro =

Galician noble (c.1290–1342)

Pedro Fernandes de Castro
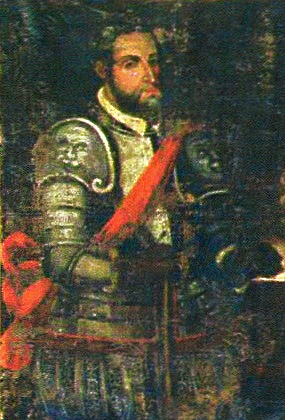
- Born: c. 1290
- Died: 1342; Algeciras
- Buried: Choir of the Cathedral of Santiago de Compostela
- Noble family: Castro
- Spouses: Infanta Beatrice of Portugal; Isabel Ponce de Leon
- Father: Fernando Rodrigues de Castro
- Mother: Violante Sánchez of Castile

Pero Fernandes de Castro or Pedro Fernández de Castro (c. 1290 – Algeciras, 1342), nicknamed o da Guerra ('of the War'), was a Galician noble and military figure of the House of Castro, descended by illegitimate lines from the kings of Castile-Leon-Galicia. Pero Fernandes de Castro was Lord of Lemos and Sarria and served as Mayordomo mayor (lord steward) of Alfonso XI of Castile, adiantado (governor) of Andalusia, Galicia and Murcia and pertigueiro mor (a title similar to the French Vidame) of the lands of Santiago.

He was the father of Fernando Ruis de Castro, Queen Joana de Castro (wife of Peter of Castile), the controversial Inês de Castro (consort King Peter I of Portugal) and Álvaro Pires de Castro.

== Family origins ==
Pedro Fernandes de Castro (o da Guerra) was the son of Fernando Rodríguez de Castro and his wife Violante Sánchez of Castile, an illegitimate daughter of Sancho IV, King of Castile and Leon. He was the paternal grandson of Esteban Fernández de Castro, Lord of Lemos and Sarria, and his wife, Aldonza Rodríguez de León, granddaughter of Alfonso IX of Leon. On his mother's side, he was a grandson of Sancho IV of Castile, King of Castile and León, and his mistress María Alfonso Téllez de Meneses.

== Biography ==
His father, Fernando Rodrigues de Castro, was killed in battle in 1304, while fighting against Infante Philip of Castile, son of Sancho IV of Castile. On the death of his father, Pedro was sent by his mother to the Kingdom of Portugal, where he was raised and educated along with Infante D. Pedro, Count of Barcelos, an illegitimate son of King Denis of Portugal. Around the year 1319, Pedro Fernandes de Castro returned to Galicia and Alfonso XI of Castile gave him his ancestral manor of Lemos and Sarria and appointed him Lord Steward of the realm. In 1330, Pedro accompanied King Alfonso on his campaign into Granada and led the Christian attack at the Battle of Teba

In 1334, Afonso IV of Portugal invaded the kingdom of Castile and León, entering through the lands of Galicia. However, Pedro Fernandes de Castro refused to fight against him, due to the favors he received in the past at the court of Portugal. Alfonso XI gave him the County of Trastámara, which the sovereign had intended to give his son Henry. Due to his military skills, Alfonso XI sent Pedro Fernandes to fight Muslims in Andalusia, where he fought at the Battle of Salado in 1340, where tradition refers to Pedro Fernandes de Castro grabbed his spurs of gold from the Marinid sultan of Morocco, Abu Al-Hasan Ali ibn Othman.

He participated in the siege of Algeciras in 1342, which he led his retinue in the company of Martín Fernández de Gres, Archbishop of Santiago de Compostela.

Pedro Fernandes de Castro died in 1342, being a victim of an epidemic during the siege of Algeciras.

== Marriage and offspring ==
His first wife was, Beatrice of Portugal, Lady of Lemos, youngest daughter of Afonso of Portugal, Lord of Portalegre and Violante Manuel, granddaughter of King Ferdinand III of Castile and León. There were no children from this marriage.

His second wife was, Isabel Ponce de Leon, daughter of Pedro Ponce de Leon, Lord of Cangas and Tineo, and his wife, Sancha Gil de Bragança. Their children were:

- Fernando Ruis de Castro toda la lealtad de España (likely a later forgery) (c. 1338 – 1377), Count of Lemos, Sarria and Trastamara, standard-bearer and steward of King Peter of Castile.
- Joana (Pires) de Castro (died 1374), first married Diego López de Haro, Lord of Orduña and Valmaseda, son of Fernando Díaz de Haro and Maria of Portugal and, after her husband's death, married King Peter of Castile in 1354. She is buried in the Cathedral of Santiago de Compostela.

From his mistress, Aldonça Lourenço de Valladares were born:

- Inês (Pires) de Castro, mistress and posthumous wife of Peter I of Portugal. She is buried beside her husband at the Monastery of Alcobaça
- Álvaro Pires de Castro. Count of Arraiolos. Lord of Cadaval and Ferreira and Constable of Portugal. He married Maria Ponce de Leon.

== Burial ==
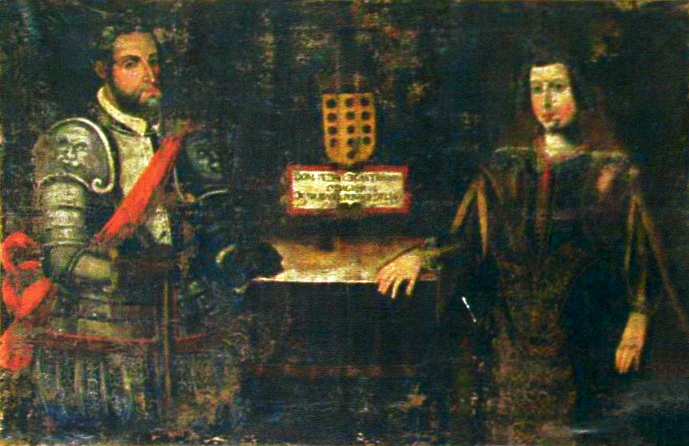
Pedro de Castro and Isabel Ponce de León, in a 17th-century Portuguese painting series depicting the ancestors of the Portuguese branch of the Castro family (Ficalho Palace, Serpa, Portugal)

At his death, the body of Pedro Fernandez de Castro was taken to Galicia and buried in the Cathedral of Santiago de Compostela. His remains were buried in the choir of the Cathedral. During 19th century his tomb was examined and found next to his remains were some pieces of silk, a brooch and gold spurs, which are supposedly those of Sultan of Morocco Abu Al-Hasan Ali ibn Othman, of which Pedro Fernandez de Castro had seized during the Battle of Salado.
