= Álvaro Pires de Castro =

Galician-Portuguese nobleman

His Lordship The Count of Arraiolos
- Coat of arms of Álvaro Pires de Castro

Constable of Portugal
- In office 1382–1384
- Monarch: Ferdinand I of Portugal
- Preceded by: position established
- Succeeded by: Nuno Álvares Pereira

Personal details
- Born: c. 1310
- Died: 11 June 1384 (aged 73–74) Lisbon, Portugal

Álvaro Pires de Castro (c. 1310 – 11 June 1384 in Lisbon) was a powerful Galician-Portuguese nobleman born in the Kingdom of Galiza, stem of the Portuguese branch of the House of Castro. He was the first Count of Viana (da Foz do Lima), the first Count of Arraiolos and the first Constable of Portugal.

== Background ==
Álvaro Pires de Castro (sometimes written as "Peres de Castro" or "Pérez de Castro") was the illegitimate son of the powerful Galician nobleman Pedro Fernández de Castro and his mistress Aldonza Lorenzo de Valladares. As a result, he was the half-brother of the powerful Galician nobleman Fernando Ruiz de Castro, the Castilian queen Juana de Castro (wife of King Peter of Castile) and a full brother of the controversial Inês de Castro, mistress and consort of King Peter I of Portugal.

The Galician Castro family had strong connections to the Kingdom of Portugal, to which they were intermittently exiled. Inês de Castro came to Portugal in 1340, in the capacity of a maid to Constanza Manuel. But Constanza's husband, Infante Peter, fell in love with the young Inês, and carried on openly with her, much to the scandal of the Portuguese court. Peter's father, King Afonso IV of Portugal had tried to banish her, but to no avail. Inês brother, Álvaro Pires de Castro, came to Portugal sometime in the 1340s, and ingratiated himself in the company of Infante Peter. The influence of Álvaro and other exiled Galician-Castilian nobles upon Infante Peter alarmed Afonso IV, who feared they might drag Portugal into the internal quarrels of neighboring Castile, part of which were orchestrated by their half-brother Fernando Ruiz de Castro. At length, when it became clear that the Castros were pushing Infante Peter to declare himself pretender to the throne of Castile-León, Afonso IV authorized the assassination of Inês de Castro in 1355.

This setback to the Castros was quickly reversed in 1357, when Afonso IV died and Infante Peter ascended to the throne as King Peter I of Portugal. Álvaro Pires de Castro was once again in the saddle, and quickly became one of the most influential men in Peter I's court and one of the most powerful men in the kingdom. At Peter I death in 1367, his son (from Constance) ascended as King Ferdinand I of Portugal, but the succession was contested by other parties. With the resolution of 1371, Álvaro Pires de Castro was settled by Ferdinand I in Portugal with the title of Count of Viana (da Foz do Lima). His power only grew from there. Álvaro Pires de Castro, his grown son Pedro de Castro and his nephews (Inês's surviving sons) John and Denis, formed a powerful clique in Ferdinand's kingdom, at first in alliance with the powerful queen Leonor Telles de Menezes, but gradually distanced himself from her.

Ferdinand I went on to appoint Álvaro Pires de Castro as the first Count of Arraiolos in 1377. During the 1381-82 Portuguese-Castilian war, Álvaro Pires de Castro was chief commander of the king's army. In 1382, Ferdinand I created the position of Constable of Portugal (leader of the Portuguese nobility) and named Álvaro Pires de Castro as its first holder. He was also alcaide-mor of Lisbon for a spell and held the lordships of Cadaval and other lands.

When the 1383–1385 Crisis broke out with the death of Ferdinand in 1383, Álvaro Pires de Castro broke openly with the queen-regent Leonor Telles de Menezes and tried to secure the succession of his nephews. His relationship with John, Master of Aviz was ambivalent. He originally supported the revolt against the queen, but distanced himself when John proved too indulgent with the towns and unlikely to support the succession of the Castro nephews. Nonetheless, his children Afonso de Castro and Brites de Castro and his daughter-in-law Leonor de Menezes (wife of Pedro de Castro) appear in contemporary records as members of John of Aviz's household, and his grandsons would emerge as significant figures during his reign as John I of Portugal.

Álvaro Pires de Castro died in July, 1384, and he was buried in a tomb alongside his wife in the monastery of São Domingos of Lisbon. After his death, the regent John of Aviz nominated his own lieutenant Nuno Álvares Pereira as the second constable of Portugal and Count of Arraiolos.

== Descendants ==
Álvaro Pires de Castro married Maria Ponce de León (daughter of Pedro Ponce de León, Lord of Marchena) around 1340. They had the following children:

- Pedro de Castro, Lord of Cadaval, married to Leonor de Meneses, daughter of João Afonso Telo, 4th Count of Barcelos
- Brites de Castro, wife of Pedro Nuñez de Lara, Count of Mayorga
- Isabel of Castro, wife of Pedro Enriquez of Castile, Count of Trastámara
- Afonso de Castro, Lord of Castro Verde

== Bibliography ==
- Sotto Mayor Pizarro, José Augusto (1987). Os Patronos do Mosteiro de Grijó (in Portuguese). Oporto. ISBN 978-0883-1886-37.
