= Fernando Ruiz de Castro =

Galician nobleman

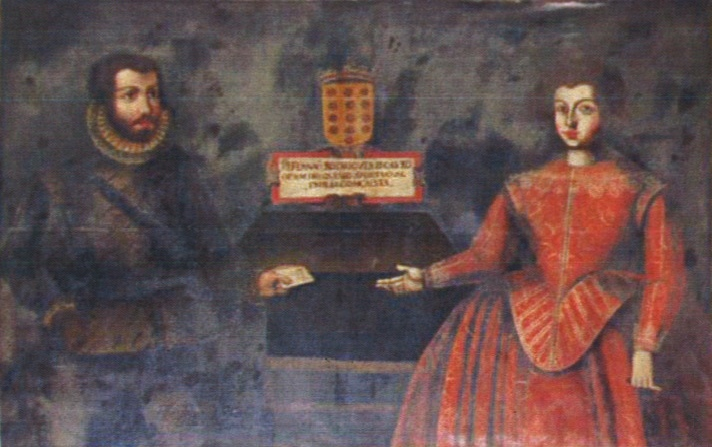
Fernando Ruiz de Castro and Mília Gonçalves, in a 17th-century Portuguese painting series depicting the ancestors of the Castro family (Ficalho Palace, Serpa, Portugal)

Fernando Ruiz de Castro (d. Bayonne, 1377), was a Galician nobleman of the House of Castro and prominent military figure. He was the third Count of Lemos, Trastámara and Sarria. He is often referred to by the appellation "Toda la lealtad de España" ("All the loyalty of Spain"), from an inscription on his tomb in Bayonne.

== Career ==
Fernando Ruiz de Castro became a prominent figure in the circle of King Peter of Castile, and served as lord steward and standard-bearer of the realm. During the Castilian Civil War, he was the leading partisan of Peter's camp, and continued fighting for the Petrist cause against the House of Trastámara even after the king's death in 1369.

== Family ==
He was the son of Pedro Fernández de Castro and Isabel Ponce de León. He was the brother of Juana de Castro, wife of King Peter I of Castile and half-brother of the controversial Inês de Castro (mistress of King Peter I of Portugal), and Álvaro Pires de Castro (leader of the Portuguese branch of the House of Castro).

His first marriage in 1354 to Juana Alfonso, illegitimate daughter of Alfonso XI of Castile, produced no offspring.

Divorced from his first wife, in 1367 he married Eleanor Enríquez, Lady of Melgar, widow of Alonso de Guzmán and daughter of Enrique Enríquez and his wife, Urraca Ponce de León. This marriage produced one son:

- Pedro de Castro - he was exiled and died in England.

From his mistress Mília Gonçalves, Lady of Assequins, he had one illegitimate son:

- Álvaro Pires de Castro, Lord of Alcáçovas - stem of a junior branch of the House of Castro in Portugal.
