= John of Castile, Lord of Valencia de Campos =

Infante John
- Lord of Valencia de Campos; Consort Lord of Biscay
- Coat of Arms of Infante John of Castile.
- Born: 15 May/25 July 1260; Seville
- Died: 25 June 1319 (aged 58–59); Pinos Puente
- Burial: Burgos Cathedral
- Spouse: Margaret of Montferrat; María Díaz I de Haro
- Issue: Alfonso, Lord of Valencia de Campos; Juan el Tuerto; Lope Díaz de Haro; María Díaz de Haro
- House: Castilian House of Ivrea
- Father: Alfonso X of Castile
- Mother: Violant of Aragon

John of Castile, called the "el de Tarifa" (Spanish: Juan de Castilla "el de Tarifa"; 1262–25 June 1319) was an infante of Castile and León. He was engaged in a decades-long fight for control over the Lordship of Biscay with Diego López V de Haro, the uncle of his wife.

== Biographical sketch ==
He was born before 15 April 1262 in Seville, the son of Alfonso X, King of Castile and León and Queen Violant of Aragon. In 1296, during the minority of his nephew Ferdinand IV of Castile, John was declared King of León, Galicia and Seville, although in 1300 he reconciled with Ferdinand IV and entered his service. In 1312, after the death of Ferdinand IV, he was appointed guardian of his son Alfonso XI, whom he served alongside Queen María de Molina and Infante Peter of Castile, Lord of Cameros.

He was the Lord of Valencia de Campos and Biscay, by his marriage to María Díaz de Haro, and was also Lord of Baena, Luque, Zuheros, Lozoya, Villalón, Oropesa, Santiago de la Puebla, Melgar de Arriba, Paredes de Nava, Medina de Río Seco and Castronuño, and he served as alférez (armour-bearer) of the King and mayordomo mayor (high steward) of the King. He was also Adelantado of Andalusia. He died in 1319 at Pinos Puente, in the battle of Sierra Elvira, also known as the disaster of Vega de Granada.

=== Marriages and issue ===
On 17 February 1281, he married Margaret, who died in 1286, daughter of William VII, Marquess of Montferrat and Elizabeth of Gloucester, with whom he had:

- Alfonso of Valencia de Campos, married as his first wife, Teresa, daughter of Juan Núñez I de Lara and in 1314, married Juana Fernández de Castro, daughter of Fernando Rodríguez de Castro and granddaughter of King Sancho IV of Castile.

One year after the death of his first wife and before 11 May 1287 he married María Díaz de Haro with whom he had three children:

- Juan de Castilla y Haro, known as Juan el Tuerto (the one-eyed).
- Lope Díaz de Haro, died after 1295 in his youth.
- María Díaz de Haro, died 1299. No issue.

== Notes ==
John of Castile, Lord of Valencia de Campos Castilian House of Ivrea Born: 15 May/25 July 1260 Died: 25 June 1319
Regnal titles
New Creation	Lord of Valencia de Campos; 1281–1300	Succeeded by Alfonso of Valencia
Preceded by Diego López de Haro IV	Lord Consort of Biscay; 1289–1294; 1310–1319 with María Díaz I de Haro	Succeeded by Henry of Castile
Preceded by Diego López de Haro V	Lord Consort of Biscay; 1289–1294; 1310–1319 with María Díaz I de Haro	Succeeded by Juan de Castilla y Haro
Preceded by Fernán Pérez Ponce de León I	Mayordomo mayor of the King; 1284–1285	Succeeded by Pedro Álvarez de las Asturias
Preceded by Manuel of Castile	Alférez del rey 1277-1284	Succeeded by Diego López V de Haro
Preceded by Juan Alfonso de Haro	Alférez del rey 1312-1318	Succeeded by Juan de Castilla y Haro
Preceded by Juan Núñez I de Lara	Adelantado mayor de la frontera de Andalucía; 1284–1292	Succeeded by Juan Fernández "Cabellos de Oro"
Titles in pretence
Preceded by Ferdinand IV	— TITULAR — King of León, Galicia and Seville; 1296–1301	Succeeded by Ferdinand IV
