= YoSoyPlex =

Spanish video blogger and YouTuber

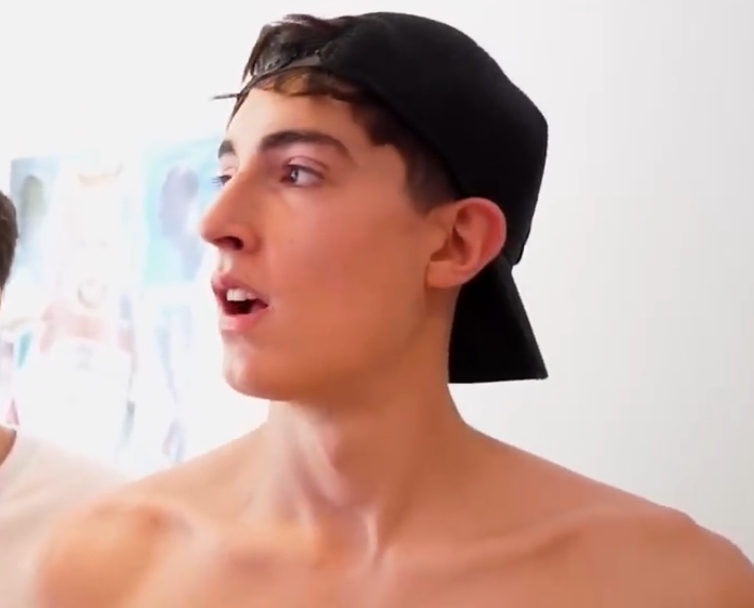
- Agúndez in 2022
- Born: Daniel Alonso Agúndez; 20 September 2001 (age 24); Toro, Zamora, Spain
- Occupations: Video blogger, YouTuber

YouTube information
- Channel: YoSoyPlex
- Years active: 2018–present
- Subscribers: 14.8 million
- Views: 2 billion
- Last updated: 19 June 2026

Daniel Alonso Agúndez (born 20 September 2001), known professionally as YoSoyPlex and Plex, is a Spanish video blogger and YouTuber. He is best known for his video blogs. As of June 2026, his YouTube channel has over 14.8 million subscribers.

== Life and career ==
Agúndez was born on 20 September 2001 in Toro, Zamora. His father was a farmer. On 19 October 2014, he created his YouTube channel, uploading his first video on 19 May 2018.

In 2023, Agúndez began a series on his YouTube channel, uploading travel blogs, where he traveled around fifteen countries within 80 days, beginning his series with traveling to Morocco and finishing off with Madagascar. He won the Best Journey YouTube Channel Award, and in 2024, he was interviewed on the television program El Hormiguero, and was ranked as one of the Best Content Creators by Forbes. He fought at La Velada del Año 4 against El Mariana, and defeated him.

As of 2026, Agúndez mainly uploads video blogs on his YouTube channel.

== Personal life ==
In May 2025, it was revealed that Agúndez is dating singer Aitana.
