= Diego López IV de Haro =

Lord of Biscay (d. 1289)

Arms of the House of Haro.

Diego López IV de Haro (died 1289) was a Spanish noble and the Lord of Biscay from 1288 to his death in 1289.

== Family origins ==
A member of the House of Haro, Diego López was the son of Lope Díaz III de Haro, from whom he inherited the title of Lord of Biscay, and his wife, Juana Alfonso de Molina, daughter of the infante Alfonso of Molina and granddaughter of King Alfonso IX of León. Her maternal grandfather was Gonzalo Núñez de Lara, señor of Belorado.

== Biography ==
With the death of his father a period of conflict started between the territories of Biscay and Castile. Diego López joined the side of Navarre and Aragon supporting the pretender to the throne Alfonso de la Cerda in the larger conflict to fight against Sancho IV of Castile. The war went poorly for Diego's side as the forces of Sancho IV began taking large swaths of territory, including the towns of Labastida, Orduña-Urduña, and Balmaseda. After a protracted conflict, Sancho IV was able to occupy Biscay.

Don Diego López died without descendants in 1289 without leaving behind any heirs. As a result, there were a series of disputes as to the succession of the lordship title which eventually passed to his sister María Díaz I de Haro.

== See also ==
- House of Haro

Preceded by Lope Díaz III de Haro	Lord of Biscay; 1288–1289	Succeeded by María Díaz I de Haro
