= Afonso of Portugal, Lord of Leiria =

Afonso
- Lord of Leiria
- Born: c. 1288
- Died: c. 1300; Lisbon
- House: Portuguese House of Burgundy
- Father: Afonso of Portugal, Lord of Portalegre
- Mother: Violante Manuel

Afonso of Portugal (c. 1288 – Lisbon, c. 1300; Portuguese pronunciation: [ɐˈfõsu]; English: Alphonzo or Alphonse) was a Portuguese noble, son of Afonso of Portugal, Lord of Portalegre and his wife Violante Manuel. He was granted the title of Lord of Leiria. Afonso of Portugal died in 1300 when he was about twelve years of age without having married and without leaving any offspring.
