= Isabel Ponce de León =

Spanish noblewoman

Isabel Ponce de León (died 1367) was a Spanish noblewoman from the Ponce de León family. She was the daughter of Pedro Ponce de León, lord of Pueblo de Asturias, Cangas and Tineo, and Sancha Gil de Chacim.

She was the lady of Villanueva de los Infantes, Castrelo, and Espinosa, and great-great-granddaughter of King Alfonso IX of León.

She married Pedro Fernández de Castro.

Their children were Juana de Castro, who became queen of Castile, and Fernando Ruiz de Castro.

== Sources ==
- Pardo de Guevara y Valdés, Eduardo (2000). Los señores de Galicia: tenentes y condes de Lemos en la Edad Media (Tomo I). Edición preparada por el Instituto de Estudios Gallegos «Padre Sarmiento» (CSIC) (1ª edición). Fundación Pedro Barrié de la Maza. ISBN 84-89748-72-1.
