= Peleagonzalo =

Coordinates: 41°29′N 5°29′W

Peleagonzalo, Spain
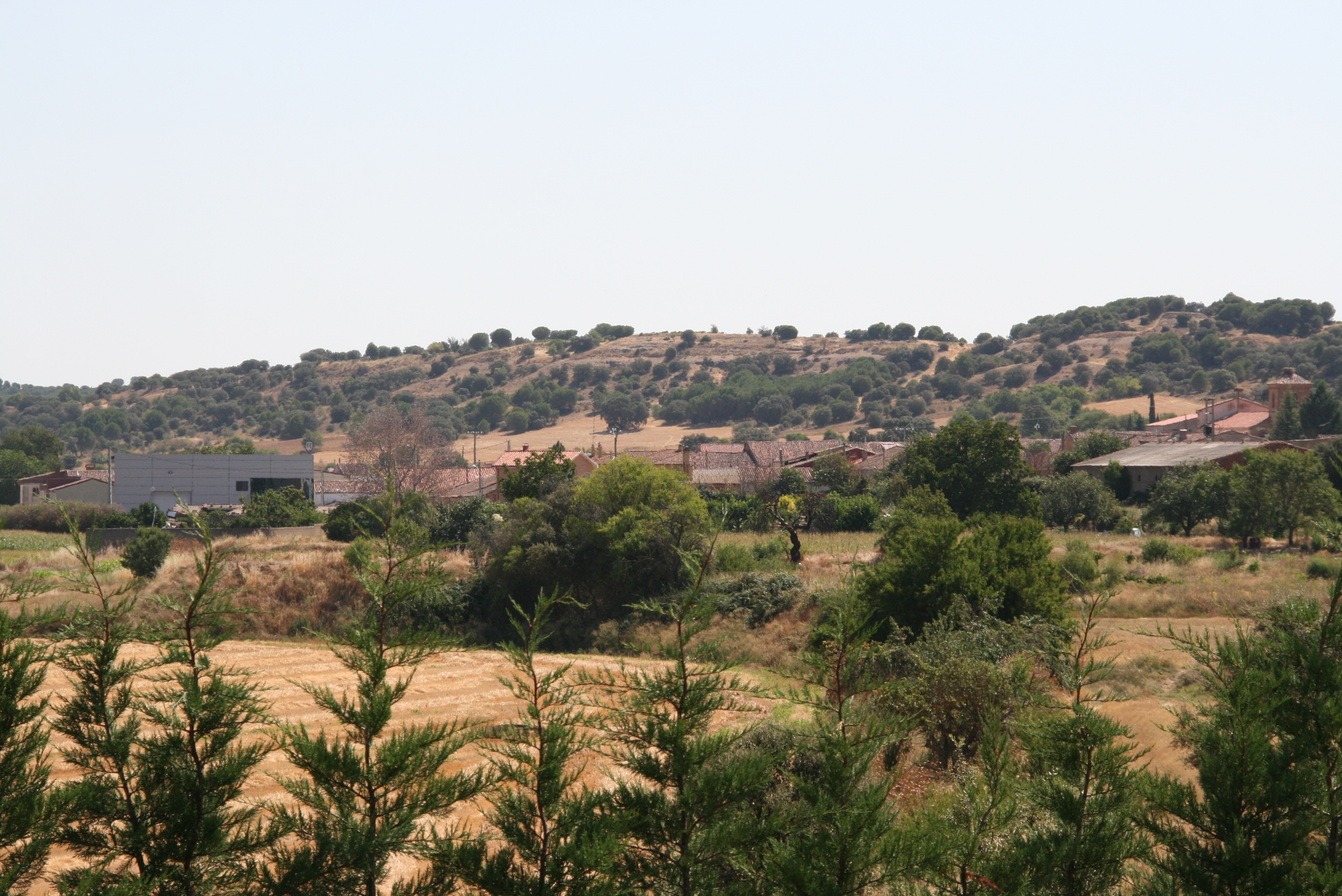
- Interactive map of Peleagonzalo, Spain
- Country: Spain
- Autonomous community: Castile and León
- Province: Zamora
- Municipality: Peleagonzalo

Area
  - Total: 13.29 km^{2} (5.13 sq mi)
- Elevation: 653 m (2,142 ft)

Population (2025-01-01)
  - Total: 286
  - Density: 21.5/km^{2} (55.7/sq mi)
- Time zone: UTC+1 (CET)
  - Summer (DST): UTC+2 (CEST)

Peleagonzalo is a municipality located in the province of Zamora, Castile and León, Spain. According to the 2004 census (INE), the municipality had a population of 392 inhabitants.
