= Tordehumos =

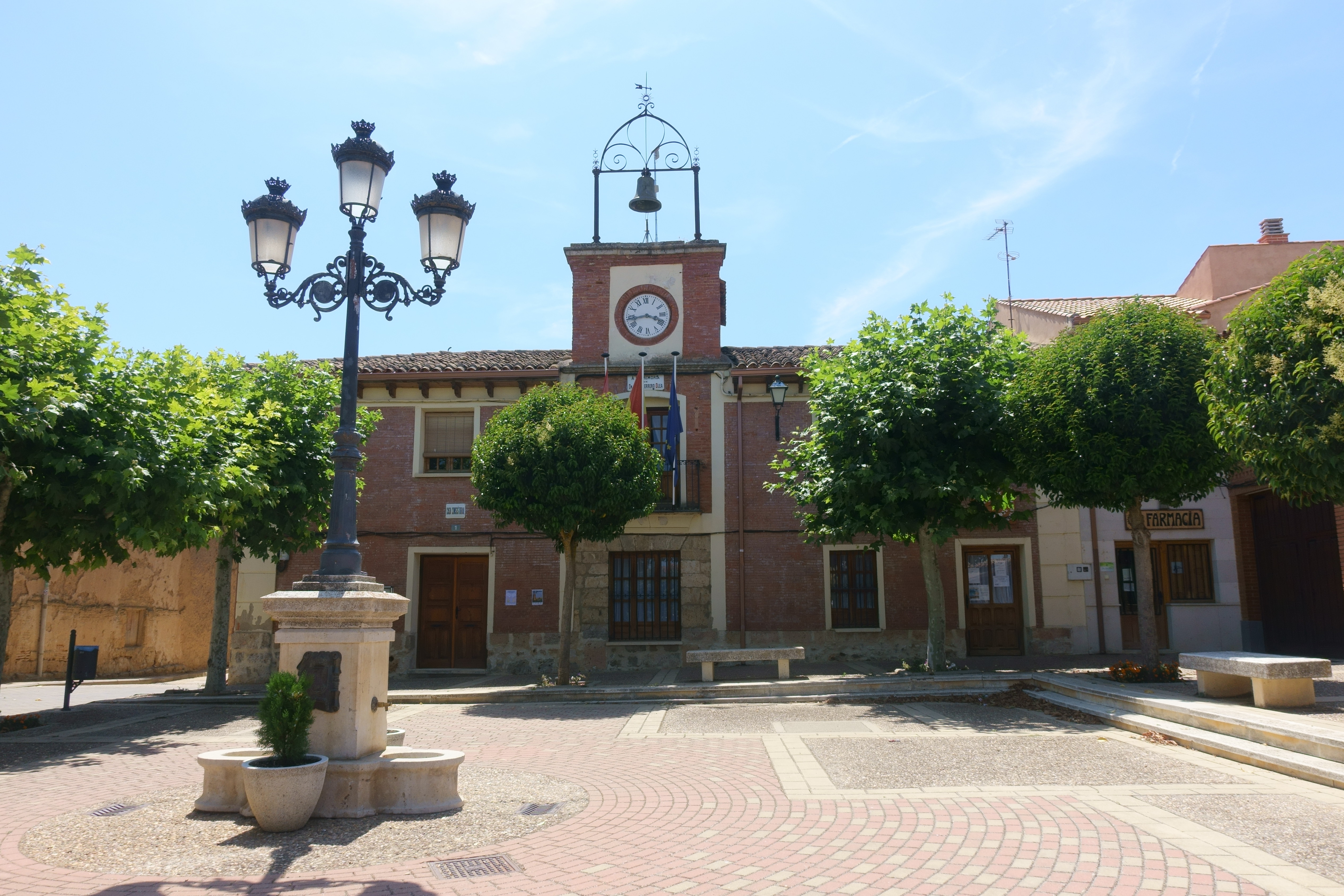
- Town hall

- Coat of arms

- Location in Spain.
- Coordinates: 41°49′N 5°9′W
- Country: Spain
- Autonomous community: Castile and León
- Province: Valladolid
- Comarca: Tierra de Campos

Government
  - Mayor: Modesto Argüello Trigo

Area
  - Total: 61.28 km^{2} (23.66 sq mi)
- Elevation: 734 m (2,408 ft)

Population (2025-01-01)
  - Total: 362
  - Density: 5.91/km^{2} (15.3/sq mi)
- Time zone: UTC+1 (CET)
  - Summer (DST): UTC+2 (CEST)
- Postal code: 47830

Tordehumos is a municipality located in the province of Valladolid, Castile and León, Spain. As of 2010 (INE), the municipality has a population of 463 inhabitants.

== See also ==
- Cuisine of the province of Valladolid
