= Juana de Castro =

Queen of Castile (died 1374)

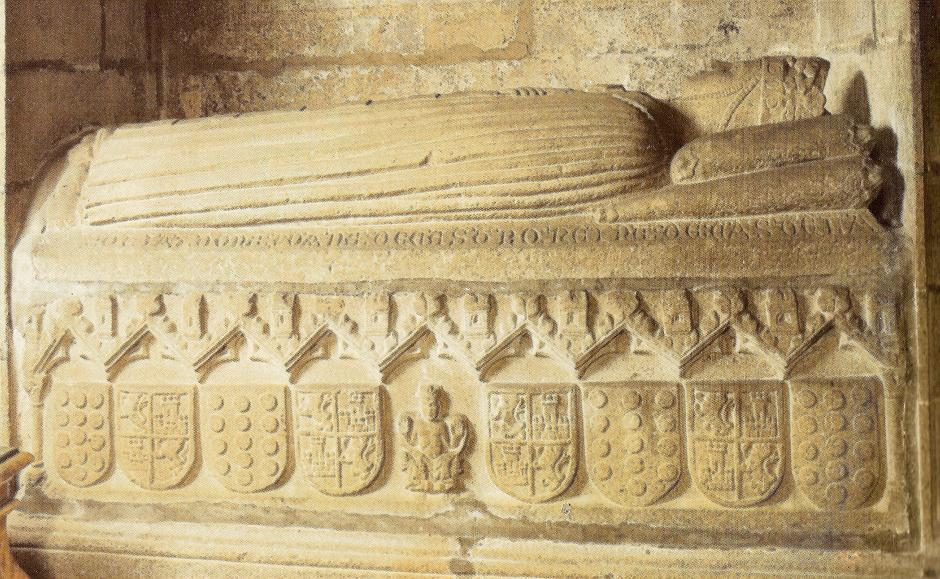

Juana de Castro (died 21 August 1374) was queen consort of the Kingdom of Castile, as the second wife of King Peter of Castile.

== Biography ==
She was born into the House of Castro as the daughter of Pedro Fernández de Castro and Isabel Ponce de León. She was the sister of Fernando Ruiz de Castro and the half-sister of Inês de Castro and Álvaro Pires de Castro.

Among her advisors were her uncle-in-law Enrique Enríquez the Younger and Men Rodríguez de Sanabria.

In 1354, after the death of her husband Diego López de Haro, with whom she had a son, she met Peter of Castile. He was attracted to her beauty and Sanabria arranged a marriage. Historian Juan Blas Sitges y Grifoll argued that Castro agreed to marry Peter out of ambition rather than love. As told by chronicler Pero López de Ayala: Castro demanded Peter to nullify his marriage with Blanche of Bourbon; he complied and had bishops Juan Lacero and Sancho Blázquez Dávila carry out the act.

In early April, they married at Cuéllar and as a part of her dowry she received Jaén Castle, Castrogeriz Castle, and Dueñas Castle. She was pronounced Queen of Castile, though the marriage lasted one day before Peter left her. She was pregnant with their son, John (1355–1405). The only estate she was left with was Dueñas Castle, retiring to the corresponding town.

On 21 August 1374, she died in Dueñas. Her tomb is in the Santiago de Compostela Cathedral.

== Bibliography ==
- Baruque, Julio Valdeón. "Juana de Castro | Real Academia de la Historia". dbe.rah.es. Real Academia de la Historia.
- Jamison, David Flavel (1864). The Life And Times Of Bertrand Du Guesclin: A History Of The Fourteenth Century.
