= Diego López III de Haro =

Lord of Vizcaya (died 1254)

- Coat of arms of the House of Haro
- Died: October 4, 1254; Bañares, Castile
- Noble family: Haro
- Spouse: Constanza de Bearne
- Issue Detail: Lope Díaz III de Haro; Diego López V de Haro; Teresa Díaz de Haro
- Father: Lope Díaz II de Haro
- Mother: Urraca Alfonso de León

Diego López III de Haro (b. ? – d. October 4, 1254, Bañares). Was the eldest son of Lope Díaz II de Haro and of Urraca Alfonso de León, the illegitimate daughter of King Alfonso IX of León. Diego succeeded his father as the Lord of Biscay between the years 1236 and 1254.

== Biography ==
In his young adulthood, Diego loyally served his uncle, the King Ferdinand III of Castile. After his father fell out of favor with the king, Ferdinand III decided to revoke the hereditary titles of lordship over La Rioja but left him with Castilla la Vieja. In defiance, Diego rebelled against the king several time, each time being forgiven after the fact. Diego then remained loyal until Ferdinand III's death in 1252. Alfonso X of Castile ascended to the throne after the death of Ferdinand III. Diego, his cousin, continued to serve him in his same position, but their relationship was incredibly strained. Finally, Diego exercised his right to refuse obedience to the king (a law recognized in Middle Age legislation to feudal lords) and began searching for another qualified candidate to become King of Navarre.

== Death ==
On October 4, 1254, Diego López III de Haro died in a town of La Rioja called Baños de Río Tobía. He was killed in a bathing tub filled with boiling water under the pretext that it would cure his rheumatism. He was buried in the Monastery of Santa María la Real of Nájera where his father and family members were previously entombed.

== Marriage and Descendants ==
Diego married Constanza de Bearne, daughter of Vizconde Guillermo II de Bearne and his wife, Garsenda de Provenza. The couple had the following five children:

- Lope Díaz III de Haro - (b. c. 1245? – d. Alfaro 1288). Inherited the Lordship of Biscay after the death of his father. Married Juana Alfonso de Molina, daughter of Alfonso de Molina and niece of the king, Alfonso IX of León. He was killed in Alfaro in 1288 by Sancho IV of Castile, the king of Castile and León.
- Diego López V de Haro - (b. c. 1250? – d. 1310). Noble from Biscay, married Violante de Castilla y Aragón, daughter of King Alfonso X of Castile. He died during the Siege of Algeciras in 1310. His body was buried in the Monasterio de San Francisco de Burgos which no longer exists today.
- Urraca Díaz de Haro - Married Fernando Rodríguez de Castro, a noble who held title over Cigales and Cuéllar and son of Rodrigo Fernández de Castro, Vizconde of Cabrera and lord of Cigales, and his wife Leonor González de Lara.
- Teresa de Haro. - Married Juan Núñez I de Lara, head of the House of Lara and son of Nuño González de Lara "el Bueno", also head of the House of Lara.
- Sancha Díaz de Haro (b. ? – d. after 1287) On April 22, 1287, her brother Diego donated to her the aldea de Santa Olalla.

== See also ==
- House of Haro
- Santa María la Real of Nájera

== Bibliography ==
- Manuel, González Jiménez (October 2004). Alfonso X el Sabio. Barcelona: Editorial Ariel S. A. ISBN 84-344-6758-5.
- Gaspar, Ibáñez de Segovia Peralta y Mendoza (1777). Joachin Ibarra (ed.). Memorias historicas del Rei D. Alonso el Sabio i observaciones a su chronica. Madrid: en casa de D. Joachin Ibarra.
- Jofré, De Loaysa; García Martínez, Antonio (1982). Crónicas de los Reyes de Castilla Fernando III, Alfonso X, Sancho IV y Fernando IV (1248-1305) (in Latin and Spanish) (2nd ed.). Murcia: Academia Alfonso X el Sabio. ISBN 84-00-05017-7.
- Francisco, Rodríguez García (2002). Crónica del Señorío de Vizcaya (1st ed.). Editorial Maxtor Librería. ISBN 84-9761-029-6.
- Luis, de Salazar y Castro (1697). Mateo de Llanos y Guzman (ed.). Historia genealógica de la Casa de Lara. Vol. 3. Madrid.

Preceded by Lope Díaz II de Haro	Lord of Biscay; 1236–1254	Succeeded by Lope Díaz III de Haro
