= Toro, Spain =

Toro
- Municipality
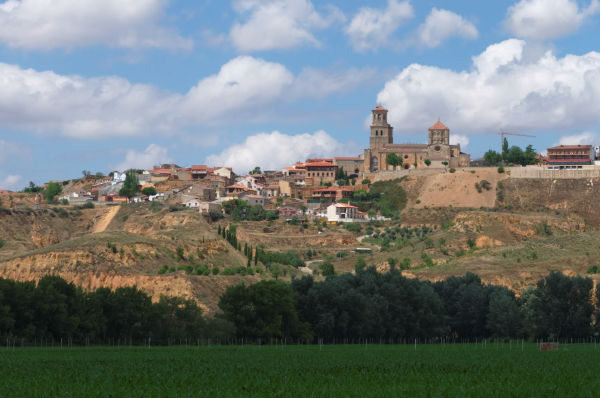

- Coat of arms

- Location in Spain Toro (Castile and León)
- Coordinates: 41°31′32″N 5°23′28″W
- Country: Spain
- Autonomous community: Castile and León
- Province: Zamora

Government
  - Mayor: Tomás del Bien Sánchez (PSOE)

Area
  - Total: 326 km^{2} (126 sq mi)
- Elevation: 740 m (2,430 ft)

Population (2025-01-01)
  - Total: 8,336
  - Density: 25.6/km^{2} (66.2/sq mi)
- Demonym: Toresanos
- Time zone: UTC+1 (CET)
  - Summer (DST): UTC+2 (CEST)
- Postal code: 49800
- Dialing code: 980
- Website: Official website

Toro is a town and municipality in the province of Zamora, part of the autonomous community of Castile and León, Spain. The town is located on a escarpment off the right bank of the Douro, at an elevation of 740 metres (2,430 ft).

Toro is known as a center of Mudéjar art and as a wine-producing region. It is located roughly halfway between Zamora, the provincial capital and Tordesillas in the province of Valladolid. The four-lane freeway (autovía) A-11 now connects these two cities and passes just north of Toro. Highway N122 passes through the town. The distance to Madrid by highway is 220 km (137 mi). Distances to other cities are: 32 km (20 mi) to Zamora, 62 km (39 mi) to Valladolid and 72 km (45 mi) to Salamanca.

== History ==
=== Antiquity ===
Toro is an ancient town, possibly the Arbukala of the Vaccai tribe which was conquered by Hannibal in 220 BC but survived to trouble the Romans. The Roman town was called Albucella. The modern name may derive from the bull totem of that Celtiberian people. In the 8th century it was conquered by the Moors. After the Muslims had been partially rolled back, Alfonso III repopulated the town in about 910.

=== Medieval ===
Ferdinand III was crowned King of León in Toro in 1230 and his wife Elisabeth of Hohenstaufen (Beatriz) died here. Enrique II, first of the Trastámara line, summoned his first Cortes here in 1369. Juan II of Castile was born here in 1404, but the town was to have greater significance for his daughter Isabella I of Castile.

Isabella (married with Ferdinand) had a rival for the succession in Juana la Beltraneja, supposedly the daughter of her half-brother Enrique IV, but allegedly the daughter of the queen's lover, the courtier Beltrán de la Cueva. La Beltraneja's supporters arranged her betrothal to Alfonso V of Portugal who was feeling upset over his earlier rejection by Isabella.

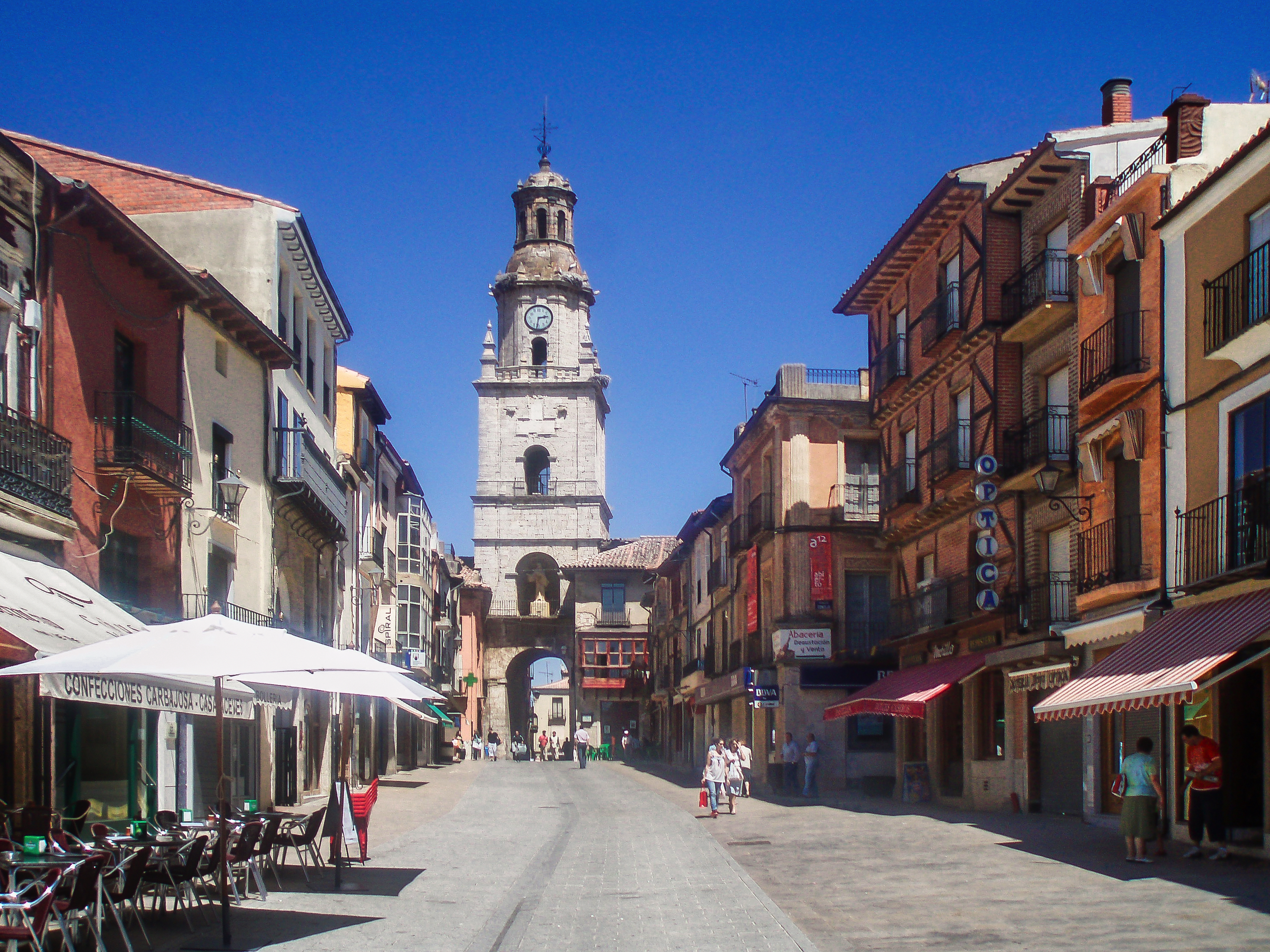
A street in Toro with the Torre del Reloj at background

Alfonso invaded Castile in May 1475, backed by a number of dissident Castilian nobles. Isabella made Tordesillas her headquarters, while Ferdinand moved to secure the loyalty of Salamanca, Toro, and Zamora. Alfonso reached Arévalo in July and both Zamora and Toro went over to him, a serious blow for the young monarchs.

Intrigue seethed as troops marched. Zamora swung back to Isabella's cause. The Portuguese crown prince arrived with reinforcements and on March 1, 1476, the rival armies met at Peleagonzalo, a few kilometres southwest of Toro. Ferdinand was victorious in this battle decided by light cavalry. The Portuguese under Alfonso broke and the king took refuge in Castronuño. However, the result was uncertain since the forces under the Portuguese crown prince defeated the Castilian right wing and remained in possession of the battle field - and thus both sides claimed victory. But the fortress of Zamora surrendered to Ferdinand soon thereafter (March 19, 1476) while Toro remained in Portuguese hands during more than half a year (until September 19, 1476). After that Alfonso gave up the fight and la Beltraneja retired to a Lisbon convent where she died in 1530, aged sixty-eight.

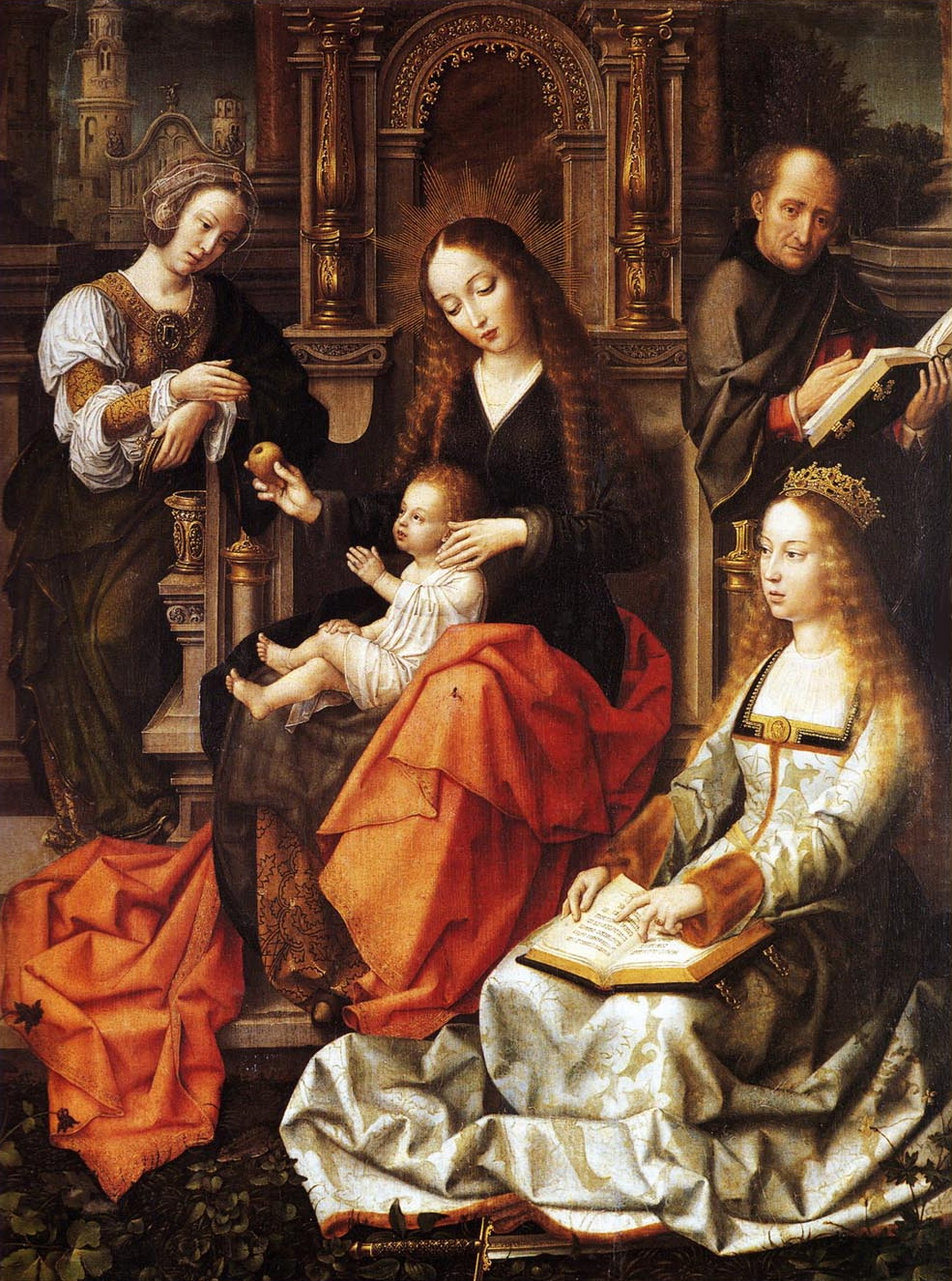
Painting of La Virgen de la Mosca, in the Collegiate church of Santa María la Mayor

In January 1506, after Isabella's death, Ferdinand summoned a Cortes at Toro. Isabella's legal successors in Castile were her daughter Joanna the Mad and her husband Philip the Handsome, who at the time stayed in the Netherlands. The Cortes took the oath to Ferdinand as temporary ruler and agreed that if Juana be deemed incurably ill, he should become regent. Ferdinand and Philip later seized power from Juana. After Philip's death in September 1506, Ferdinand had himself declared regent and Juana retired to Tordesillas.

=== 1500 to present ===
When in 1520 the towns of Castile, the Comuneros, rose against her son Charles I, who had succeeded his Spanish grandfather in 1516, Toro sided with them. Charles defeated the Comuneros at Villalar de los Comuneros, east of Toro, the next year.

During the Peninsular War, in the bitter cold of December 1808, Sir John Moore began his retreat from Toro in the face of superior French forces. The ghastly ordeal ended in Moore's death before A Coruña (Galicia) in January. In May 1813, 100,000 British troops gathered in Toro under Wellington's command and from here Wellington launched the final campaign which expelled Napoleon's armies from Spanish soil after five terrible years.

English traveller Richard Ford (English writer) visited Toro in 1831 and reported a population of 9,000; it has just under 10,000 now. In 1838 it lost its status as a provincial capital, its province being merged with Zamora.

Toro also featured as a notable stop on English writer Laurie Lee’s journey across Spain in his celebrated book ‘As I Walked Out One Midsummer Morning’, published in 1969.

== Main sights ==
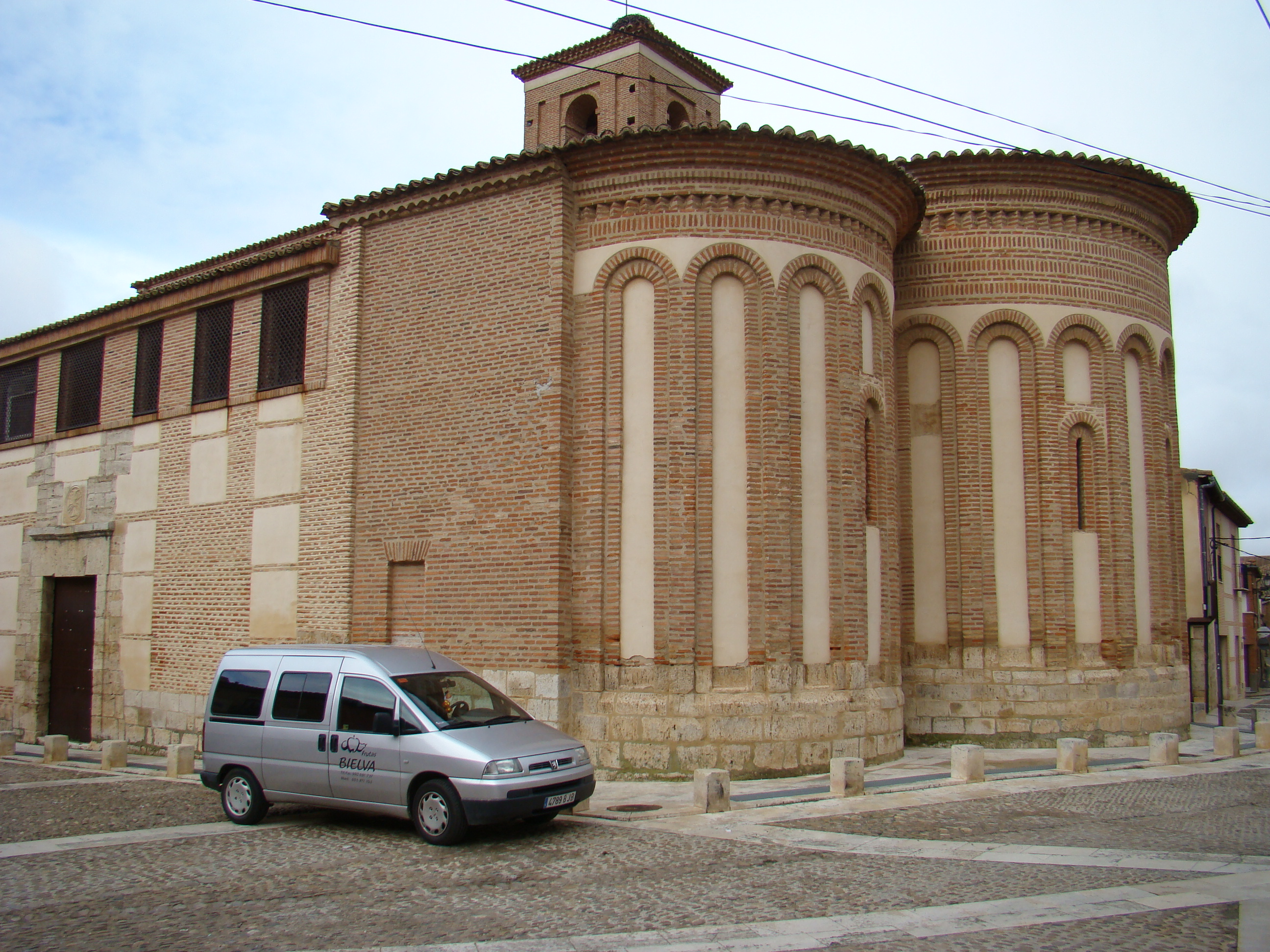
San Salvador church.

The town of Toro is built in the shape of a fan, in whose center stands the Collegiate church of Santa María la Mayor, dating to the 12th century. Outstanding on the outside is the polychrome western door, called; and on the inside, the famous Flemish painting La Virgen de la Mosca ("Virgin of the Fly") and an unusual pregnant Virgin.

Next to the collegiate church is the Espolón viewing point, which offers views of a fertile plain known as the "oasis of Castile."

The town also has the remains of a wall from 910 AD; and the gates of Corredera and Santa Catalina, from the 17th and 18th centuries. Noteworthy civic buildings include the façade of the Law Palace, the City Hall, and the palaces of the Counts of Requena, the Marquis of Alcañices or the Marquis of Castrillo. Among the ecclesiastical buildings are the churches of San Lorenzo el Real, in Mudéjar style; San Salvador de los Caballeros, which contains a Museum of Religious Art; San Sebastián, and the monasteries of Sancti Spiritus, Santa Clara and Santa Sofía.

== Notable people ==
- Luis Cuadrado (born 1934 in Toro; died 1980 in Madrid), cinematographer
- Jesús López-Cobos, conductor (b. 1940)
- Bernardo Bonavía y Zapata (died 2 December 1812), political figure who was in a variety of political positions in New Spain. The positions included Corregidor of a Mexican province (1789), Governor-Intendant of Durango (1796–1809), governor of Spanish Texas (1786) and Military Commander of Texas (1809–1812).
- YoSoyPlex, YouTuber

== Toro wine ==
Toro has been long famous for its wine (Toro (DO)). The Toro wines were so prestigious that King Alfonso IX of León conceded privileges for its production in the 12th century. Columbus took Toro wine with him on the expedition to discover America in 1492, because it could survive large journeys, due to its structure and body. Friar Diego de Deza, from Zamora, one of Isabel the Catholic's confessors, collaborated economically in the expedition, for which he was allowed to name one of the caravels, the Pinta that was half full of Toro wine. The Designation of the Toro Region is recent, beginning in the mid 70s, under the Specific Designation (Denominación Específica), which preceded the attainment of Designated Region (Denominación de Origen) on 29 May 1987.

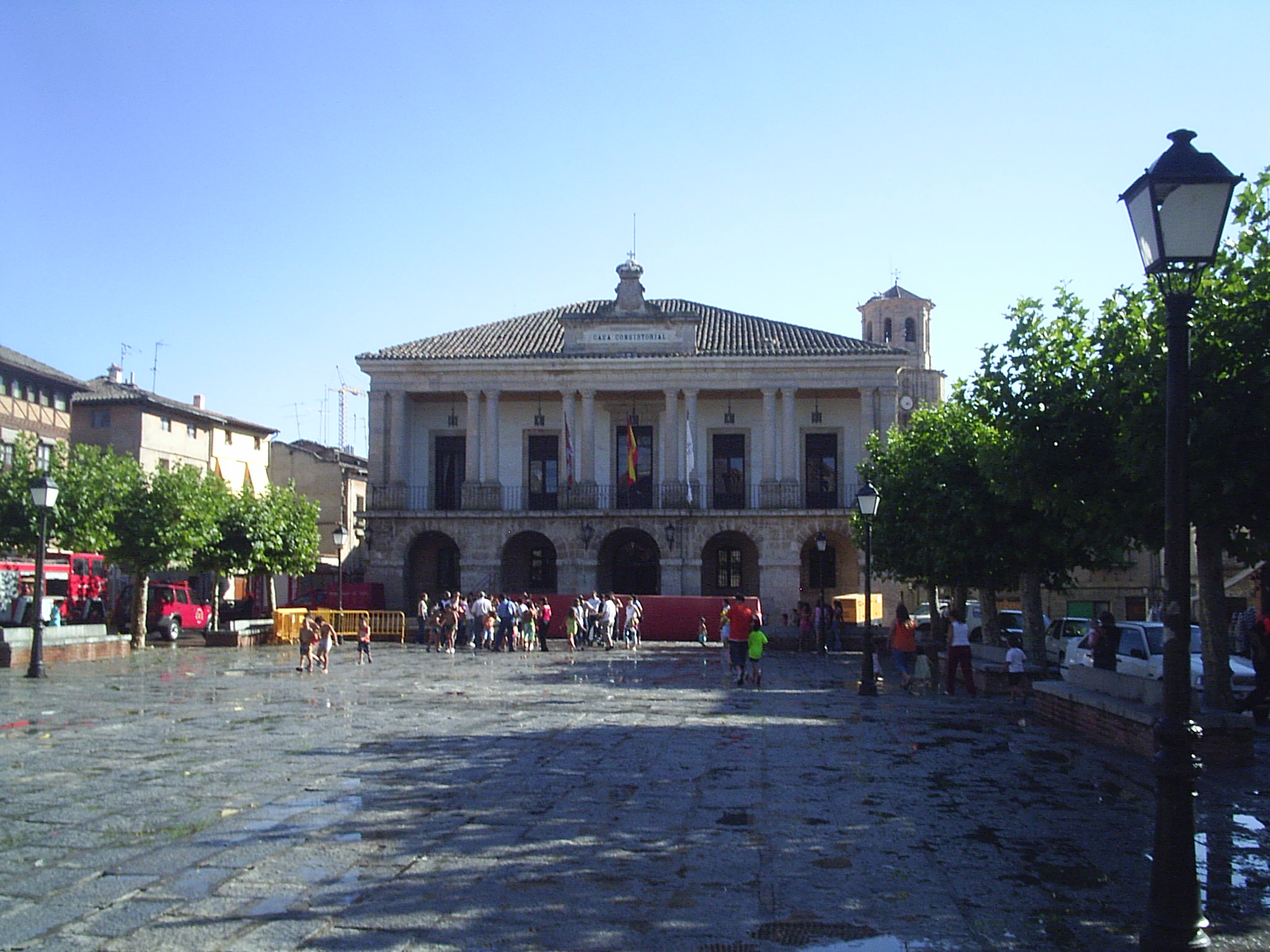
Toro's City hall.

== Twin towns – sister cities ==
- Condom, France
- Dormagen, Germany

== See also ==
- Spanish wine

== Sources ==
- Guia Total, Castilla y León, (Madrid 1995).
- A River in Spain, Rober White (London 1998).
- Dictionary of Greek and Roman Geography, by William Smith
- Historia del Cristianismo, Editorial Unilit, 1994, Miami, Tome 2, Parte II (La era de los conquistadores), by Justo L. González. ISBN 1560634766
- La “imcomparable” Isabel la Catolica (The “imcomparable” Isabella, the Catholic), Encuentro Editiones, printed by Rogar-Fuenlabrada, Madrid, 1993 (Spanish edition), by Jean Dumont.
