= Manuel of Castile =

- House of Manuel of Villena coat of arms.

Lord of Villena
- Reign: 1252 – 1283
- Successor: Juan Manuel, Prince of Villena
- Born: 1234; Carrión de los Condes
- Died: 25 December 1283 (aged 48–49); Peñafiel, Spain
- Burial: Monastery of Uclés
- Spouse: Constance of Aragon; Beatrice of Savoy
- Issue: Violante Manuel; Juan Manuel, Prince of Villena
- House: Castilian House of Ivrea
- Father: Ferdinand III of Castile
- Mother: Elisabeth of Swabia

Manuel of Castile (1234 – 25 December 1283). The first Lord of Villena and Peñafiel, Cuéllar, and Escalona, was an Infante, son of Ferdinand III of Castile and his wife Elisabeth of Hohenstaufen.

== Life ==
Born in Carrión de los Condes, the name Manuel was given to him to commemorate his maternal grandmother's roots in Imperial Byzantium. He was granted the Seigneury of Villena in 1252, created for him to govern that lordship as "apanage" (a medieval micro-state that would return to the central crown if the minor lineage ends with no successor). This lordship would grow by receiving the cities around the Vinalopó River (Elda valley, Aspe, Crevillente, Elche). He also received the Adelantamiento of the Kingdom of Murcia.

Manuel travelled to Italy in 1259 as part of the embassy sent by his father to Pope Alexander IV. Later, when his brother became king Alfonso X the Wise, he served him as Alférez and Majordomo of the king.

He died at Peñafiel in 1283 and was buried in the Monastery of Uclés. His son Juan Manuel, who succeeded him in Villena and Peñafiel among the others, and became prince of Villena, was a notable medieval writer.

Manuel of Castile, as son of Ferdinand III of Castile, belonged to the royal House of Burgundy of Castile and León, but he was also the first of a new family branch, the House of Manuel of Villena.

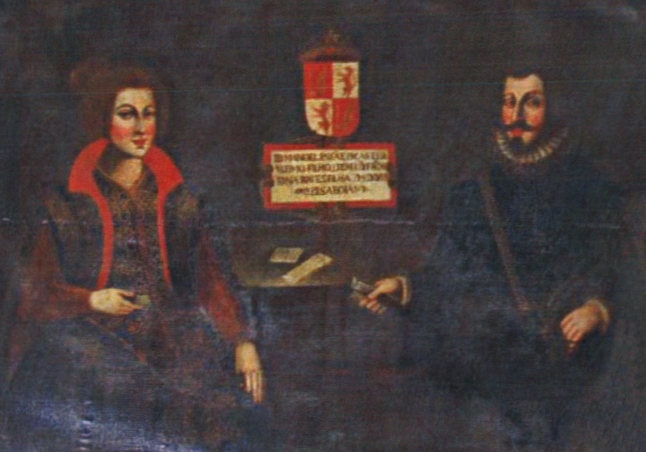
Manuel of Castile and Beatrice of Savoy, in a 17th-century Portuguese painting series depicting the ancestors of the Manuel family (Ficalho Palace, Serpa, Portugal)

== Family ==
He married twice. His first wife, whom he married in 1260 in Soria was Constance of Aragon, daughter of James I of Aragon. Two children were born of this marriage:

- Alfonso Manuel (1260/1261–Montpellier, 1276), without issue.
- Violante Manuel (1265–Lisbon, 1314), lady of Elche and Medellín. Married circa 1287 to Afonso of Portugal, son of Afonso III of Portugal.

His second marriage after Constança's death was in 1274/1275 to Beatrice of Savoy, daughter of Amadeus IV of Savoy. One child was born of this marriage:

- Juan Manuel (1282–1348), Prince of Villena, Duke of Penafiel and Lord of Escalona.

Children from other women include:

- Sancho Manuel (1283-after 1345), Lord of Infantado and Carrion. First married María Rodríguez de Castañeda, and then Inés Díaz de Toledo. With issues from both marriages.
- Enrique Manuel (born circa 1272)
- Blanca Manuel (born circa 1273)

== Ancestry ==
Ancestors of Manuel of Castile

16. Alfonso VII of León and Castile
8. Ferdinand II of León
17. Berengaria of Barcelona
4. Alfonso IX of León
18. Afonso I of Portugal
9. Urraca of Portugal
19. Maud of Savoy
2. Ferdinand III of Castile
20. Sancho III of Castile
10. Alfonso VIII of Castile
21. Blanche of Navarre
5. Berenguela of Castile
22. Henry II of England
11. Eleanor of England
23. Eleanor of Aquitaine
1. Manuel of Castile, Lord of Villena
24. Frederick II, Duke of Swabia
12. Frederick I, Holy Roman Emperor
25. Judith of Bavaria
6. Philip of Swabia
26. Renaud III, Count of Burgundy
13. Beatrice I, Countess of Burgundy
27. Agatha of Lorraine
3. Elisabeth of Swabia
28. Andronikos Doukas Angelos
14. Isaac II Angelos
29. Euphrosyne Kastamonitissa
7. Irene Angelina
30. George Komnenodoukas Palaiologos; (1125–1168)
15. Unknown Palaiologina?, afterwards Irene
31. ?Irene Komnene Kantakouzene?
