= Violante Manuel =

Castilian noble

- Born: c. 1265
- Died: 1314 (aged 48–49); Lisbon, Kingdom of Portugal
- Burial: Dominican monastery, Lisbon, Portugal
- Spouse: Afonso of Portugal, Lord of Portalegre
- Issue: Afonso of Portugal, Lord of Leiria; Maria, Lady of Meneses and Orduña; Isabel, Lady of Penela; Constança, Lady of Portalegre; Beatriz, Lady of Lemos
- House: Castilian House of Ivrea
- Father: Manuel of Castile
- Mother: Constance of Aragon

Violante Manuel of Castile (c. 1265 – 1314 in Lisbon) was a Castilian noble, daughter of Manuel of Castile and his first wife Constance of Aragon. She was Lady of Elche, Elda, Novelda, Medellín and half of Peñafiel in her own right.

== Tomb of Violante Manuel ==
At her death, the body of Violante Manuel was buried in the Convent of Santo Domingo, but was destroyed during the 1755 Lisbon earthquake.

== Issue ==
With her husband Afonso of Portugal, Lord of Portalegre, she had five children:

- Afonso of Portugal, Lord of Leiria
- Maria of Portugal, Lady of Meneses and Orduña
- Isabel of Portugal, Lady of Penela, married Juan de Castilla y Haro, with issue.
- Constança of Portugal, Lady of Portalegre, married Nuño González de Lara, without issue.
- Beatriz of Portugal, Lady of Lemos, married, as his first wife, Pedro Fernández de Castro, without issue.

== Ancestors ==
Ancestors of Violante Manuel

8. Alfonso IX of León
4. Ferdinand III of Castile
9. Berengaria of Castile
2. Manuel of Castile
10. Philip of Swabia
5. Elisabeth of Hohenstaufen
11. Irene Angelina
1. Violante Manuel
12. Peter II of Aragon
6. James I of Aragon
13. Marie of Montpellier
3. Constance of Aragon, Lady of Villena
14. Andrew II of Hungary
7. Violant of Hungary
15. Yolanda de Courtenay
