= Afonso of Portugal, Lord of Portalegre =

Infante Afonso
- Lord of Portalegre
- Born: 8 February 1263; Lisbon, Kingdom of Portugal
- Died: 2 November 1312 (aged 49); Lisbon, Kingdom of Portugal
- Burial: Dominican monastery, Lisbon, Portugal
- Spouse: Violante Manuel
- Issue: See Issue
- House: Portuguese House of Burgundy
- Father: Afonso III
- Mother: Beatrice of Castile

Infante Afonso of Portugal (8 February 1263, in Lisbon – 2 November 1312, in Lisbon; Portuguese pronunciation: [ɐˈfõsu]; English: Alphonzo or Alphonse) was a Portuguese infante (prince), the second son of King Afonso III of Portugal and his second wife Beatrice of Castile. He was titled Lord of Portalegre, Castelo de Vide, Arronches, Marvão and Lourinhã.

Afonso was born on 8 February 1263 and in 1287 married Violante Manuel, daughter of Castilian Infante Manuel of Castile.

Afonso died on 2 November 1312 in Lisbon.

== Issue ==
By his wife Violante Manuel he had five children:

- Afonso of Portugal, Lord of Leiria;
- Maria of Portugal, Lady of Meneses and Orduña;
- Isabel of Portugal, Lady of Penela, married Juan de Castilla y Haro, with issue;
- Constança of Portugal, Lady of Portalegre, married Nuño González de Lara, without issue;
- Beatriz of Portugal, Lady of Lemos, married, as his first wife, Pedro Fernández de Castro, without issue.

== Ancestry ==
Ancestors of Afonso of Portugal, Lord of Portalegre

16. Afonso I of Portugal
8. Sancho I of Portugal
17. Maud of Savoy
4. Afonso II of Portugal
18. Ramon Berenguer IV, Count of Barcelona
9. Dulce of Aragon
19. Petronila of Aragon
2. Afonso III of Portugal
20. Sancho III of Castile
10. Alfonso VIII of Castile
21. Blanche of Navarre
5. Urraca of Castile
22. Henry II of England
11. Eleanor of England
23. Eleanor of Aquitaine
1. Infante Afonso, Lord of Portalegre
24. Alfonso IX of León
12. Ferdinand III of Castile
25. Berenguela of Castile
6. Alfonso X of Castile
26. Philip of Swabia
13. Elisabeth of Hohenstaufen
27. Irene Angelina of Constantinople
3. Beatrice of Castile
28. Pedro Rodríguez de Guzmán
14. Guillén Pérez de Guzmán
29. Mahalda
7. Mayor Guillén de Guzmán
30. Gonzalo Rodríguez Girón
15. María González Girón
31. Sancha Rodríguez
