= Fernando de la Cerda =

Fernando de la Cerda may refer to:

- Fernando de la Cerda (1255–1275), Infante of Castile, son of Alfonso X of Castile
- Fernando de la Cerda (1275–1322), son of the preceding
