= Juan Núñez III de Lara =

Spanish lord (1313–1350)

Juan (III) Núñez de Lara y de la Cerda
- Arms of the House de la Cerda before 1376
- Born: 1313
- Died: 28 November 1350 (aged 37); Burgos
- Noble family: House de la Cerda
- Spouse: María Díaz II de Haro
- Issue: Juana; Lope Diaz; Isabel; Nuno Diaz (illeg.) Pedro (illeg.) Diego
- Father: Ferdinand de la Cerda
- Mother: Juana Núñez de Lara

Juan III Núñez de Lara y de la Cerda (born Juan Fdez. de la Cerda y Núñez de Lara: 1313 - Burgos, 28 November 1350), Lord of Lara and Vizcaya, son of Ferdinand de la Cerda (1275–1322) and Juana Núñez de Lara the Little Dove. Despite belonging to the House de la Cerda and aspiring to the Castilian-Leonese throne during the reigns of Sancho IV of Castile, Ferdinand IV of Castile and Alfonso XI of Castile, he carried the family name of his mother which corresponded to the name of his lordship.

He was Lord of Biscay by his marriage to María Díaz II de Haro, daughter of Don Juan de Haro the One-Eyed. He was also Lord of Villafranca, Oropesa, Torrelobatón, Lerma, Paredes de Nava, Castroverde and Aguilar. Ensign of the King and Lord Steward of Alfonso XI of Castile. He was a great-grandson of Alfonso X the Wise, King of Castile and León, and Louis IX, King of France.

== Family Origins ==
Son of Ferdinand de la Cerda (1275–1322) and Juana Núñez de Lara the Little Dove. As such, he embodied the claim of his paternal grandfather, Infante Ferdinand de la Cerda, eldest son of King Alfonso X the Wise, while being heir to both the Lara holdings of his namesake maternal grandfather, Juan Núñez de Lara "the Fat", and to the lordship of Viscaya coming from his maternal grandmother Teresa Díaz of Haro.

== Inheritance ==
On the death of his uncle, Juan Núñez de Lara the Younger in 1315, he became lord of the House of Lara, although his uncle, the late Lord of Lara, had arranged in his will that all his possessions were sold and the proceeds from its sale should go to prayers for the repose of his soul. However, the noblemen of Castile unwilling to remain without a Lord asked the king to appoint Juan Nunez de Lara, despite his young age, master of the House of Lara. The King concurred and the noblemen gathered a sum of money that included land, castles and villas for the lordship of Lara. In 1326, his signature appears on some border privileges. A year after the death of Juan de Haro, Juan Nunez de Lara was named Ensign of the King, and as such appears confirmed in his privileges from that year, ranking first among the nobility.

In 1329, Don Juan Manuel, was at odds with Alfonso XI of Castile, because the king had imprisoned his wife, who was the daughter of Don Juan Manuel. Therefore, Don Juan Manuel, suggested that the Lord of Lara be married to María Díaz II de Haro. After approval of the marriage, Don Juan Manuel promised to make war on Alfonso XI, until María's father's, Juan de Haro, possessions were returned, along with the lordship of Vizcaya. Concluding the agreement, Juan Nunez de Lara and Don Juan Manuel went to the city of Bayonne, where María Díaz had been taken after the assassination of her father, fearing reprisals from Alfonso XI. In 1331, in the city of Bayonne, Juan Nunez de Lara married María Díaz II de Haro.

Shortly thereafter, Don Juan Manuel arranged the marriage of his daughter Constance to Infante Pedro of Portugal, son of King Alfonso IV of Portugal. With this, Don Juan Manuel got the support of the Portuguese ruler who had been allied with Alfonso XI, soon to be joined by the Sultan of Granada. The agreement with the ruler of Granada was made with the intention of pressuring Alfonso XI to return María Díaz II de Haro's possessions that had been confiscated by him.

== Revolts against Alfonso XI ==
Arms of Juana Núñez of the House of Lara, mother of Juan Núñez III.

In 1332, when Alfonso XI was crowned and instituted the Knights of the Band in the kingdom of Castile and León, Juan Núñez de Lara and Don Juan Manuel, showing their disagreement with the king, were not present at the ceremonies. At that time, both Don Juan Manuel and Juan Núñez de Lara, fortified their positions and tried to alienate the king's servants and members of his house, such as Juan Martinez de Leyva, who left his post as Chamberlain in court and moved to the post of chief steward of Juan Nunez de Lara, despite the entreaties of Alfonso XI. Shortly thereafter, Don Juan Manuel and Juan Núñez de Lara began to make war on Alfonso XI, Don Juan Manuel from his Castle of Peñafiel and Juan Núñez de Lara from the city of Lerma. The king, who was in the city of Burgos, moved to the city of Valladolid. A short time later, Alfonso XI seized the castle of Avia, which had been occupied by supporters of the rebel barons.

In 1333, the Muslims besieged the city of Gibraltar. Alfonso IX, who at that time was fighting against the two rebel nobles, sent the masters of the Military Orders to relieve Gibraltar, while he remained in Castile parleying with Don Juan Manuel and Juan Núñez de Lara to achieve peace. Soon after, the king sought the help of Manuel and de Lara to rescue the city of Gibraltar. Don Juan Manuel informed the king, that if he wanted his help he should give him the title of Duke, allow him to decide who inherited his possessions after his death and to be allowed to coin money in his own domain. For his part, Juan Núñez de Lara asked the king for the Lordship of Biscay to be returned to his wife and all the villas, estates and castles which had belonged to her father, Juan de Haro. Alfonso XI delayed the granting of a response to such demands, and shortly thereafter went to meet with Don Juan Manuel in Peñafiel. Despite the initial goodwill, a final agreement was not reached between the rebel noble and his sovereign. Meanwhile, troops of Juan Núñez de Lara devastated Tierra de Campos, the king was informed of the seriousness of the situation in the besieged Gibraltar crossing, so Alfonso XI, insisted that Juan Núñez de Lara and Don Juan Manuel accompany him. Meanwhile, the city of Gibraltar capitulated to the Muslims and Alfonso XI began to besiege it, but had to raise the siege before the arrival of troops from Granada and Algeciras. Shortly thereafter, Juan Alfonso de Haro, who was at odds with the king, sided with Don Juan Manuel and Juan Núñez de Lara in their common struggle against Alfonso XI.

During Lent of 1334, a squire of Juan Núñez de Lara gave Alfonso XI a letter, in which he informed the king that he was ending his vassal relationship with him. Enraged the king ordered the feet and hands the message bearer cut off, who was later beheaded. The king then considered attacking Juan Núñez de Lara, who was besieging the town of Cuenca de Campos. The king, after seizing the towns of Melgar and Morales, addressed Valladolid in order to recruit more troops. Soon after, they laid a series of ambushes against Juan Núñez de Lara, who managed to escape. Alfonso XI then decided to seize the strongholds of Vizcaya that were still loyal to María Díaz II de Haro, wife of Juan Núñez de Lara. Then the king besieged the fortresses of Villafranca Montes de Oca and Bustos and seized Peñaventosa, and ordered its demolition. Alfonso XI, after leaving some of his troops besieging the Peña de San Juan, he returned to Castile, where in the town of Agoncillo, ordered the execution of Juan Alfonso de Haro, for abuses committed by him in the kingdom, for his support of rebel barons, and for having appropriated funds belonging to the Crown. After the execution, Alfonso XI besieged the town of Henry, where Juan Núñez de Lara was located, while the sovereign ordered Rodrigo Alvarez of Asturias to the town of Torrelobatón, where Juana Núñez de Lara was located. Finding himself surrounded and unable to get help from his ally, Don Juan Manuel, Juan Núñez de Lara decided to make peace with the king. In order to terminate disputes, Alfonxo XI confirmed the lordship of Biscay on Juan Núñez de Lara. Juan Núñez de Lara agreed, in the future, to recognize Alfonso XI as his king and give him all that he required. Shortly thereafter, Don Juan Manuel made peace with Alfonso XI.

== Alfonso XI besieges Juan Núñez ==
In June 1336, Alfonso XI besieged the town of Lerma, where Juan Núñez de Lara was located. Meanwhile other armies were besieging Torrelobatón, Busto and Villafranca. Alfonso XI also sent the Order of Santiago and the Order of Calatrava to besiege Castle Garcimuñoz, where Don Juan Manuel was located. The village of Torrelobatón soon capitulated to the king's troops, with Alfonso XI imposing the condition that they never return to power of Juan Núñez de Lara.

Juan Núñez de Lara, finding himself surrounded and without possibility of receiving relief, agreed to negotiate peace with Alfonso XI. It was then agreed that Juan Núñez de Lara and his supporters would retain all their possessions, that the fortifications of Lerma, Busto, Villafranca would be demolished, and that de Lara could not fortify any cities without the consent of the king. Also to prevent further transgressions of Juan Núñez, he would give Alfonso XI hostages. Agreeing to terms between them, Alfonso XI appointed Juan Núñez de Lara, Ensign of the King and returned part of the Crown lands that had been theirs, giving also the towns of Cigales, Villalón de Campos and Morales.

In 1339, the ambassadors of King Peter IV of Aragon reported to Alfonso XI that they were willing to help in the fight against Muslims in the south of the Iberian Peninsula. That same year, Juan Núñez de Lara was knighted by Alfonso XI in Seville. In 1339, Alfonso XI invaded the counties of Antequera and Ronda, held by the Muslims, joined by Juan Núñez de Lara, Juan Manuel, Prince of Villena, and Alfonso Meléndez de Guzman.

King Abu al-Hasan Ali ibn Othman of Morocco. invaded Spain in 1340, and after a naval battle, defeated the army of Alfonso XI and surrounded the city of Tarifa. Alfonso XI, requested help from the kings of Aragon and Portugal, meeting Alfonso IV of Portugal at city of Seville. In the Battle of Río Salado, Juan Núñez de Lara distinguished himself in battle, fought alongside Juan Manuel, Prince of Villena, the Master of the Order of Santiago and other nobles at the forefront. He took part in the success garnered by the Christian armies at that time. In 1341 Alfonso XI conquered the town of Alcalá la Real, Juan Núñez de Lara was present lieutenant of the king.

== Siege of Algeciras ==
During the Siege of Algeciras (1342–44), Alfonso XI surrounded the city of Algeciras, which was in the hands of Muslims. Juan Núñez de Lara, Juan Manuel, Pedro Fernández de Castro, Juan Alfonso de la Cerda, lord of Gibraleón, knights of France, England and Germany, and even King Philip III of Navarre, king consort of Navarra, who came accompanied by 100 horsemen and 300 infantry all participated in the siege. In June 1342, Pedro Fernández de Castro, Lord of Lemos and Sarria died of an epidemic. Alfonso XI divided Pedro's office between Don Juan Manuel, Juan Núñez de Lara, and Fernando Ruiz de Castro, all possessions that had belonged to his late father. In March 1344, after almost two years of siege, the city of Algeciras surrendered.

In 1349, after spending several years in retirement, Juan Núñez de Lara was summoned by Alfonso XI, together with the other nobles, so they could assist in the siege of Gibraltar. Alfonso XI went to Andalusia and laid siege to Gibraltar until 1350. The Castilian nobles, including Juan Nunez de Lara, petitioned Alfonso XI to lift the siege, because he risked losing his life if he persisted in the company. Despite the entreaties of Juan Núñez, Fernando Manuel, Lord of Villena and son of the late Don Juan Manuel, and Juan Alfonso de Alburquerque, Alfonso XI persisted in his attempt to take Gibraltar, until he died in March 1350. After the death of Alfonso XI, his eldest son Pedro was proclaimed king. Juan Núñez de Lara, Ferdinand, Prince of Asturias and the other nobles lifted the siege of Gibraltar and led the body of Alfonso XI to the town of Seville, where he was buried in the Chapel Royal. On completion of the actual funeral of Alfonso XI, King Pedro I of Castile confirmed Juan Núñez de Lara in the office of lieutenant of the King and Lord Steward.

On 28 November 1350, Juan Núñez de Lara died, suddenly and mysteriously, in the city of Burgos. Supporters of Juan Nunez suspected poison.

== Burial of Juan Núñez de Lara ==
At his death, the body of Juan Núñez de Lara was buried in the Convento de San Pablo de Burgos by the Dominicans, who had close ties to his family. The tomb contained the remains of Juan Nunez de Lara, as well as those of his parents and maternal grandfather.

== Marriage and offspring ==
In 1331, he married María Díaz II de Haro, Lady of Vizcaya, the daughter of Juan de Haro, Lord of Biscay and Isabel of Portugal. Their children were:

- Juana de Lara (1333 - killed in 1359), Lady of Lara and Vizcaya between 1352 and 1359. She married Tello of Castile, illegitimate son of Alfonso XI of Castile, being killed in Seville, with 26 years of age during the civil war between her husband's brothers Peter of Castile and Henry II of Castile.
- Lope Díaz de Haro (c. 1337–1350), died in childhood.
- Isabel de Lara (c. 1335 - poisoned in 1361), Lady of Lara and Vizcaya between 1359 and 1361. She succeeded her sister in the possession of the Lordship of Biscay. She married Juan de Aragón, son of Alfonso IV of Aragon. Her husband was assassinated by his cousin, Peter I of Castile, in 1358, and she was poisoned three years later, in 1361.
- Nuño Díaz de Haro (1348–1352). Lord of Lara and Vizcaya. Successor of his father, but died by age 4, in 1352.

From his affair with Mayor Leguizamon were born:

- Pedro de Lara (1348–1384), Count of Mayorga, who married Beatriz de Castro, daughter of Álvaro Pires de Castro and María Ponce de León, and granddaughter of Pedro Fernández de Castro.
- Diego de Lara.

Preceded by Juan Núñez II de Lara	Head of the House of Lara; 1315–1350	Succeeded by Nuño Díaz de Haro
Preceded by Pedro Fernández de Castro	Mayordomo mayor del rey 1345–1350	Succeeded by Nuño Díaz de Haro
Preceded by Juan de Haro	Alférez del rey 1328–1332	Succeeded by Juan Alfonso de Alburquerque
Preceded by Juan Alfonso de Alburquerque	Alférez del rey 1336–1350	Succeeded by Nuño Díaz de Haro
