= Juana Núñez de Lara =

Spanish noblewoman (1286–1351)

- Born: 1286; Palencia
- Died: 12 June 1351; Palencia
- Noble family: House of Lara
- Spouses: Henry of Castile; Ferdinand de la Cerda
- Issue: Juan Núñez III de Lara; Blanche Núñez de Lara; Margaret Núñez de Lara; María Núñez de Lara
- Father: Juan Núñez I de Lara
- Mother: Teresa Díaz II de Haro

Juana Núñez de Lara (1286 – 1351) was a daughter of Juan Núñez de Lara the Fat and his wife Teresa Díaz II de Haro of the lordship of Biscay. Juana is also known as la Palomilla or Lady of Lara.

== Life ==
Juana was first married to Infante Henry of Castile, son of Ferdinand III of Castile and his first wife Elisabeth of Swabia. The marriage was childless and Henry died in 1304, leaving Juana a young widow.

Juana was married secondly to Ferdinand de la Cerda, son of Ferdinand de la Cerda and his wife Blanche of France. Blanche was a daughter of Louis IX of France and Margaret of Provence. Juana and Ferdinand had four children:

- Juan Núñez III de Lara (1313–1350), married María Díaz II de Haro.
- Blanche Núñez de Lara (1311–1347), married Juan Manuel, Prince of Villena and was mother of Juana Manuel of Castile, consort of Henry II of Castile and mother of John I of Castile.
- Margaret Núñez de Lara, a nun.
- María Núñez de Lara, married Charles II of Alençon and was mother of Charles III of Alençon.

Juana's husband died in 1322, Juana herself died in Palencia in 1351.

== Ancestry ==
Ancestors of Juana Núñez de Lara

16. Nuño Pérez de Lara
8. Gonzalo Núñez de Lara
17. Teresa Fernández de Traba
4. Nuño González "el Bueno" de Lara
18. Diego López II de Haro
9. María Díaz de Haro
19. Toda Pérez de Azagra
2. Juan I Núñez de Lara
20. Ferdinand II of León
10. Alfonso IX of León
21. Urraca of Portugal
5. Teresa Alfonso
22. Martim Gomes da Silva
11. Aldonza Martínez de Silva
23. Urraca Rodríguez
1. Juana Núñez de Lara
24. Diego López II de Haro
12. Lope Díaz II de Haro
25. Toda Pérez de Azagra
6. Diego López III de Haro
26. Alfonso IX of León
13. Urraca Alfonso de León
27. Inés Íñiguez de Mendoza
3. Teresa Díaz de Haro
28. William I, Viscount of Béarn
14. Guillem II de Montcada
29. Mary, Viscount of Béarn
7. Constance de Béarn
30. Alfonso II, Count of Provence
15. Garsenda de Provenza
31. Garsenda, Countess of Forcalquier

== Sources ==
- Doubleday, Simon R. (2001). The Lara Family, Crown and Nobility in Medieval Spain. Harvard University Press.
- Estow, Clara (1995). Pedro the Cruel of Castile: 1350-1369. Brill.
