= Princess Blanche =

Princess Blanche is the name of:

- Blanche of France (1253–1323), 8th child of Louis IX of France
- Blanche of France (1282–1305), daughter of Philip III of France and Maria of Brabant; wife of Rudolph I of Bohemia
- Blanche of France, Duchess of Orléans (1328–1382), daughter of Charles IV of France and Jeanne d'Évreux; wife of Philip of Valois, Duke of Orléans
- Blanche d'Évreux (1331–1398), queen consort of Philip VI of France
