= Juana Manuel =

Queen of Castile and León from 1369 to 1379

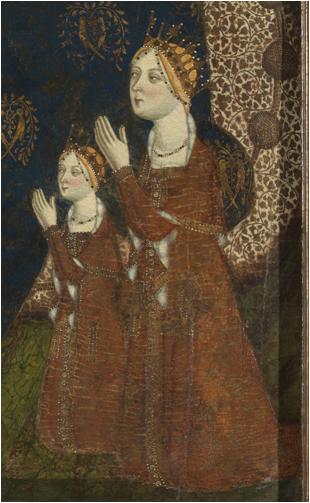
- Juana and one of her daughters, painted by Jaume Serra in the mid-fourteenth century

Queen consort of Castile and León
- Tenure: 1369–1379
- Born: 1339
- Died: 27 March 1381 (aged 41–42); Salamanca
- Burial: Cathedral of Toledo
- Spouse: Henry II of Castile (m. 1350; died 1379)
- Issue: John I of Castile; Eleanor, Queen of Navarre; Infanta Joanna
- House: Castilian House of Ivrea
- Father: Juan Manuel, Prince of Villena
- Mother: Blanca Núñez de Lara

Juana Manuel (1339 – 27 March 1381) was Queen of Castile from 1369 until 1379 by marriage to king Henry II of Castile. She was also the heiress of Escalona, Villena, Peñafiel and Lara, as well as Lady of Biscay.

== Family ==
Juana was the daughter of Juan Manuel, Prince of Villena (1282–1348) and his third wife Blanca Núñez de Lara de La Cerda. Her mother Blanca (d. 1347) was a descendant of the lords of Biscay and of Lara and of Alfonso X's eldest son, Fernando de la Cerda. She was the last undisputably legitimate member of the House of Ivrea.

== Marriage ==
Juana's father had been an enemy of King Alfonso XI of Castile, while the king tried to neutralize the Peñafiel family. On 27 July 1350 Juana's brother and guardian, Fernando Manuel of Peñafiel, married her to Henry, an illegitimate son of Alfonso XI.

== Inheritance and queenship ==
In 1361, on the death of her niece Blanca, daughter of her brother Fernando Manuel who himself had died in c. 1350 without other children, she inherited the Duchy of Villena, Escalona and Peñafiel.

Because Juana was a maternal granddaughter of La Palomilla (Juana Núñez de Lara), she also inherited Lara and Biscay.

In 1369, her husband became King Henry II of Castile, after he deposed and murdered his half-brother to take the throne, and she became queen of Castile and León.

When in 1381 she died and left her inheritance to her son, it was finally united with Castile, and ultimately Spain.

== Issue ==
Juana and Henry had:

- King John I of Castile (1358–1390)
- Eleanor (died 1416)
- Joanna

== Sources ==
- Doubleday, Simon R. (2001). The Lara Family: Crown and Nobility in Medieval Spain. Harvard University Press.
- Previte-Orton, C.W. (1912). The Shorter Cambridge Medieval History. Vol. 2. Cambridge at the University Press.

Juana Manuel Castilian House of Ivrea Cadet branch of the House of Ivrea Born: circa 1339 Died: 27 March 1381
Royal titles
| Preceded by Blanche of Bourbon | Queen consort of Castile and León; 1369–1379 | Succeeded by Eleanor of Aragon |
Spanish nobility
| Preceded by Blanca Manuel | Lady of Villena, Escalona and Peñafiel; 1361–1381 | Incorporated into the Crown of Castile |
| Preceded by Tello Alfonso | Lady of Biscay and Lara; 1370–1379 | Incorporated into the Crown of Castile |
