= Teresa de Haro =

Teresa de Haro may refer to:

- Teresa Díaz de Haro, daughter of Diego López II de Haro, lady of Biscay
- Teresa Díaz II de Haro (born before 1254), daughter of Diego López III de Haro, wife of Juan Núñez I de Lara, mother of Juan Núñez II de Lara, amongst others. Lady of Biscay.
