= Blanca de la Cerda =

Spanish noblewoman

Blanca Núñez de Lara
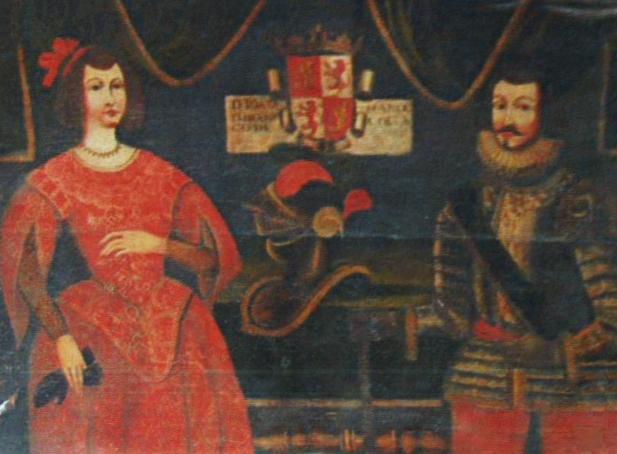
- Blanca de La Cerda and Don Juan Manuel, in a 17th-century Portuguese painting series depicting the ancestors of the Manuel family (Ficalho Palace, Serpa, Portugal)
- Born: c. 1317
- Died: 1347
- Noble family: House de la Cerda
- Spouse: Juan Manuel, Prince of Villena
- Issue: Fernando Manuel; Juana Manuel
- Father: Ferdinand de la Cerda
- Mother: Juana Núñez de Lara

Blanca Núñez de Lara (c. 1317 – 1347) was a Spanish noblewoman.

She was the daughter of Fernando de la Cerda (1275–1322) and Juana Núñez de Lara, called "la Palomilla".

Blanca was the third wife of Juan Manuel, Prince of Villena, a member of the junior branch of the Castilian royal house. They had two children: Fernando Manuel, his father's heir, and Juana Manuel, who married the (illegitimate) Henry II of Castile and became queen consort of Castile.

== Ancestry ==
Ancestors of Blanca de la Cerda

16. Ferdinand III of Castile
8. Alfonso X of Castile
17. Elisabeth of Swabia
4. Ferdinand of Castile
18. James I of Aragon
9. Violant of Aragon
19. Violant of Hungary
2. Fernando de la Cerda
20. Louis VIII of France
10. Louis IX of France
21. Blanche of Castile
5. Blanche of France
22. Ramon Berenguer IV, Count of Provence
11. Margaret of Provence
23. Beatrice of Savoy
1. Blanca Núñez de Lara
24. Gonzalo Núñez de Lara
12. Nuño González "el Bueno" de Lara
25. María Díaz de Haro
6. Juan I Núñez de Lara
26. Alfonso IX of León
13. Teresa Alfonso
27. Aldonza Martínez de Silva
3. Juana Núñez de Lara
28. Lope Díaz II de Haro
14. Diego López III de Haro
29. Urraca Alfonso de León
7. Teresa Díaz de Haro
30. Guillem II de Montcada
15. Constance de Béarn
31. Garsenda de Provenza

== Sources ==
- Doubleday, Simon R. (2001). The Lara Family: Crown and Nobility in Medieval Spain. Harvard University Press.
