= Teresa Díaz de Haro =

Spanish noblewoman

- Coat of arms of the House of Haro
- Born: Before 1254
- Noble family: Haro
- Spouse: Juan Núñez I de Lara
- Issue Detail: Juan Núñez II de Lara; Nuño González de Lara; Juana Núñez de Lara
- Father: Diego López III de Haro
- Mother: Constanza de Bearne

Teresa Díaz II de Haro (born before 1254) was a Spanish noblewoman and a lady of Biscay, and one of five children of Diego López III de Haro, the Lord of Biscay, and Constanza de Bearne. Her maternal grandparents were the viscount Guillermo II de Bearne and his wife, Garsenda of Provence. Her paternal grandparents were Lope Díaz II de Haro, also Lord of Biscay, and of Urraca Alfonso de León, the illegitimate daughter of King Alfonso IX of León. Amongst her siblings was Diego Lopez V de Haro.

== Biography ==
Teresa married Juan Núñez I de Lara around 1270 after his first wife, Teresa Álvarez de Azagra died. Juan Núñez was the head of the House of Lara after the death of his father Nuño González de Lara el Bueno in 1275. He also held title of lordship over Lerma, Amaya, Dueñas, Palenzuela, Tordehumos, Torrelobatón and the Castle of La Mota and inherited the title of Lord of Albarracín from his first wife and held all these titles until his death in 1294.

Her date of death is unknown.

== Marriage and descendants ==
Teresa had four children with Juan Núñez I de Lara:

- Juan Núñez II de Lara (c. 1276–1315). Succeeded his father as head of the House of Lara and as Señorío de Albarracín. He was married three times without leaving behind any heirs.
- Nuño González de Lara (c. 1284–1296). He was lieutenant of King Ferdinand IV of Castile. He married Constanza de Portugal y Manuel, daughter of Alfonso of Portugal and granddaughter of King Alfonso III of Portugal. He died in 1296 leaving behind no heirs.
- Juana Núñez de Lara (1285–1351). Married Enrique de Castilla "el Senador" in 1299. He was son of King Ferdinand III of Castile. After that marriage, she was married a second time to Fernando de la Cerda (1275–1322), son of Fernando de la Cerda, Crown prince of Castile and nephew of Alfonso X de Castilla. This marriage bore many children. Her children inherited the head of house Lara.
- Teresa Núñez de Lara y Haro (c. 1280–c. 1314). Married Alfonso de Valencia, son of Juan de Castilla "el de Tarifa" and nephew of King Alfonso X. She died without leaving any heirs.

== See also ==
- House of Haro
- House of Lara
