= Lordship of Villena =

Medieval Lordship in Spain

Lordship of Villena Duchy of Villena Señorío de Villena (Spanish)
- Coat of arms
- Capital: Villena
- Government: Monarchy
  - 1252 – 1283: Manuel of Castile (Lord)
  - 1283 – 1348: Don Juan Manuel (Lord, Duke and Prince)
  - 1348 - 1350: Fernando Manuel de Villena (Lord and Duke)
  - 1350 - 1361: Blanca Manuel de Villena (Lady and Duchess)
  - 1361 - 1366: Juana Manuel de Villena (Lady and Duchess) (Queen of Castile)
Succeeded by
Duchy of Villena; Marquisate of Villena
- Today part of: Spain

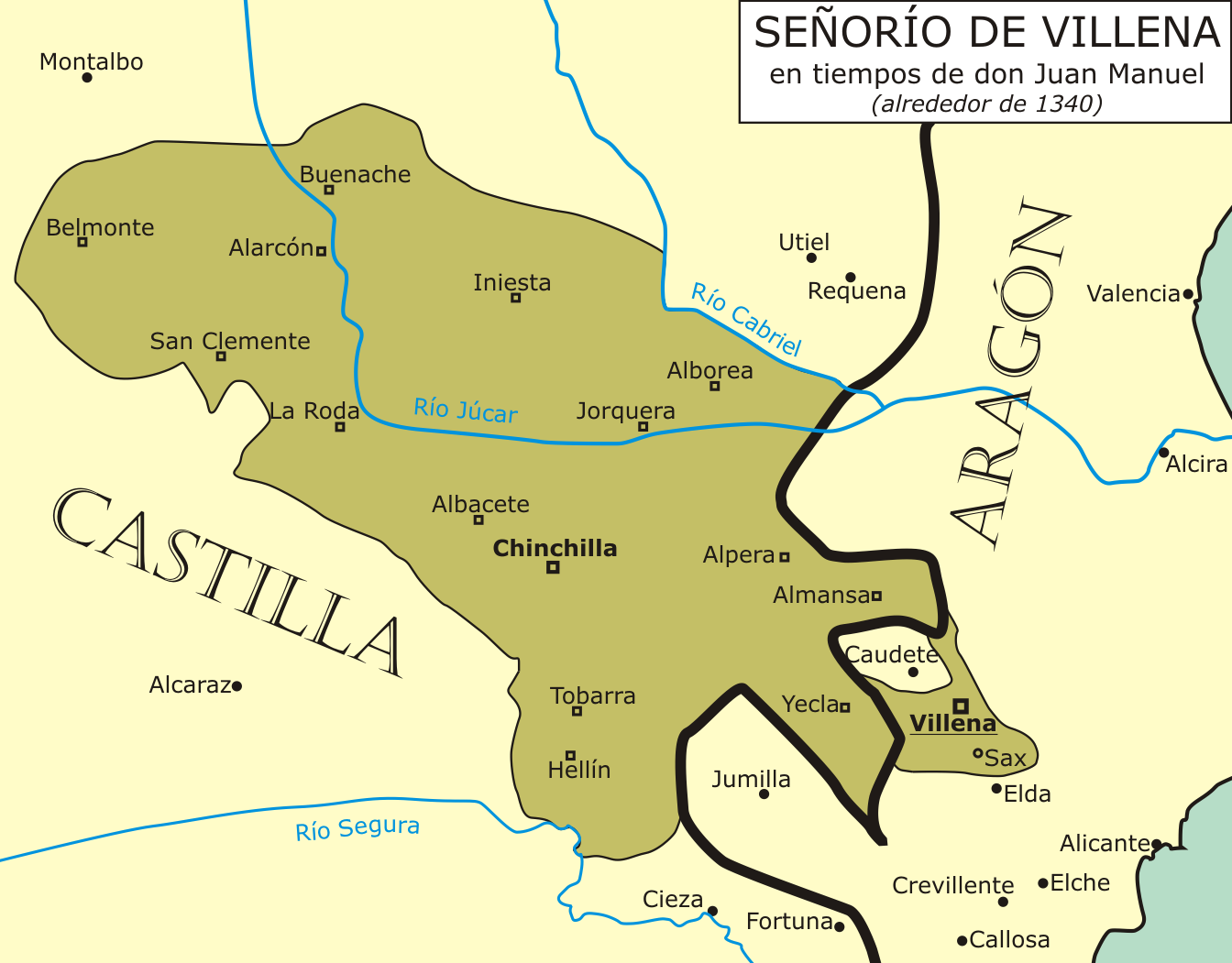
Extension of the Lordship of Villena at the time of Don Juan Manuel, around the year 1340

The Lordship of Villena (Spanish: Señorío de Villena) was a feudal state located in southern Spain, in the kingdom of Castile. It bordered to the north with Cuenca and to south with the city of Murcia.

== Territory ==
Initially, the lordship included the towns and cities from the coasts of Elche and the entire territory of the Vinalopó River, extending even to the valley of Ayora and Cofrentes. Over time it would end up covering a good part of the current provinces of Alicante, Albacete, Murcia, Valencia and Cuenca, representing de facto since its creation a true buffer state between the Crowns of Castile and Aragon.

Lately, the territory was structured in two political centers: the Land of Alarcón, to the north, and the Land of Chinchilla to the south. Less central were the towns of Iniesta, the Land of Jorquera, Hellín, Tobarra, Almansa, Yecla, Sax and Villena, which, despite giving the name to the lordship, was territorially peripheral, although it previously included the cities along Vinalopó river (Sax, Elda, Novelda, Elche). The borders changed with the time, provided the temporary addition of some towns (Villarrobledo, Lezuza, Munera, Jumilla and Utiel in the 15th century) and the loss of some other towns.

The lordship has a double historical origin. On the one side, the towns and villages of the Land of Jorquera, Hellín, Ves, Tobarra, Almansa, Yecla, Sax and Villena were owned by Infante Manuel of Castile, so it began to be called the Land of don Manuel. On the other side, the Land of Alarcón and Iniesta belonged to the crown during the 12th and 13th centuries, being incorporated to the lordship by Juan Manuel, Prince of Villena, who had a very wide jurisdiction in his land and made it become a Duchy and, finally, a Principality.

== Duchy and Principality of Villena ==
Upon the death of Don Manuel, the manor was inherited by his son, Don Juan Manuel, second lord, prince and first duke of Villena. It was he who would expand the manor and lead it to its period of greatest splendour, acquiring with his possessions an autonomy practically comparable to that of the peninsular kingdoms, playing with its border situation between Castile and Aragon. This phase of great power and autonomy would lead him to elevate the title to Duchy and even to a lifelong Principality, going so far as to mint his own currency or maintain a personal retinue of more than a thousand knights.

The Duchy returned to the Crown in 1366 after his only son Fernando Manuel had no male offspring.
The title of Marquess of Villena was giving to Alfonso I, Duke of Gandia, but this title returned to the Crown in 1385 when his son Pedro was killed in the Battle of Aljubarrota.

In the XV century the title of Duke of Villena was recreated and taken away several times, until it returned to the Crown in 1445.
Finally, the title of Marquess of Villena was recreated in 1445 for Juan Pacheco and still exists today.

== List of holders ==
	Holder	Period	Relation
Lord of Villena
i	Manuel of Castile	1336-1283	
ii	Don Juan Manuel	1283-1336	his son
Duke of Villena (1st Creation)
i	Don Juan Manuel	1336-1348	
ii	Fernando Manuel de Villena	1348-1350	his son
iii	Blanca Manuel de Villena	1350-1361	his daughter
iv	Juana Manuel, Queen of Castile	1361-1366	her aunt
....	Returned to the Crown		
Duke of Villena (2nd Creation)
v	Maria of Castile, Queen of Aragon	1409-1415	
vi	Henry of Trastámara	1420-1424	her brother in law
vii	Catherine of Castile	1424-1425	his wife, Maria's younger sister
viii	Henry IV of Castile	1436-1445	her nephew
....	Returned to the Crown		

== Bibliography ==
- Pretel Marín, Aurelio; Rodríguez LLopis, Miguel (1998). El señorío de Villena en el siglo XIV (in Spanish). Albacete: Instituto de estudios albacetenses "Don Juan Manuel" de la Excma. Diputación de Albacete. ISBN 84-87136-86-9.
- Soler García, José María (2006). Historia de Villena: desde la Prehistoria hasta el siglo XVIII [History of Villena: from Prehistory to the 18th Century] (in Spanish). Digitalised by the Biblioteca Virtual Miguel de Cervantes (1st ed.). Villena: Fundación Municipal José María Soler & M.I. Ayuntamiento de Villena. ISBN 978-84-934950-0-8.
