= Peñafiel Castle =

Castle in Spain

Coordinates: 41.5967°N 4.11431°W

Castle of Peñafiel
- Castillo de Peñafiel
- Peñafiel, Province of Valladolid, Castile and León, in Spain
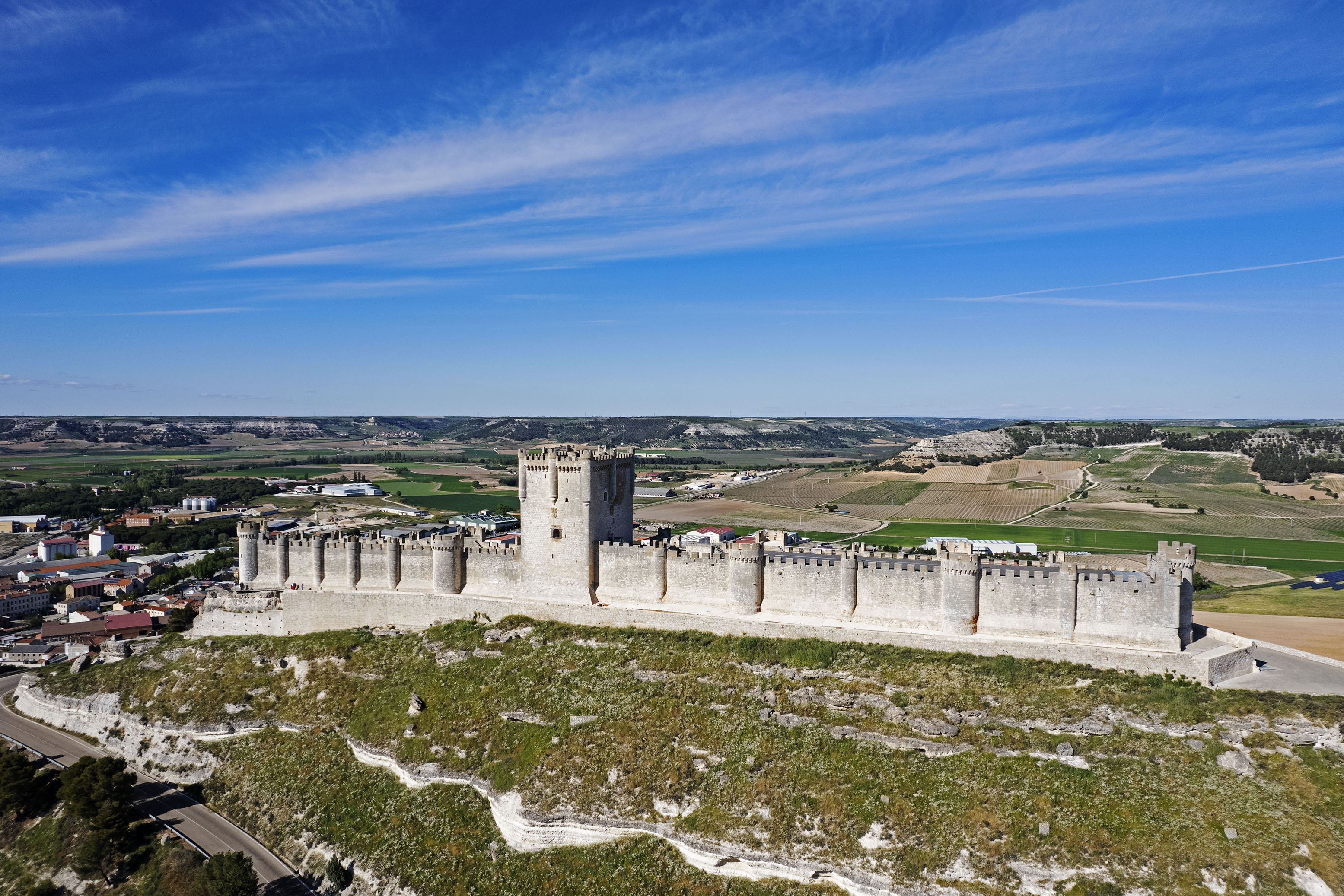
- Peñafiel Castle on the hill, 2024.

Site information
- Type: Castle
- Owner: Municipality of Peñafiel
- Open to the public: Yes
- Condition: Spanish Property of Cultural Interest; Castle of Peñafiel; 1 June 1917; RI-51-0000148

Location
- Height: 34 m

Site history
- Built: 10th century
- In use: The Wine Museum
- Materials: Rocks

Peñafiel Castle is located in Peñafiel, Valladolid Province, Castile and León, Spain. The castle is more than 200 metres (660 ft) long and encloses an area about 35 m (115 ft) wide. Standing in the middle is a 34 m (112 ft) high three storey keep.

Fernán González began construction on the Peñafiel site in 947, as a frontier outpost in defense against the Arabs. A castle was built in 1013 by Sancho Garcia to protect the land. Several other members of the Spanish nobility added to the castle including Juan Manuel and Pedro Girón. Blanche I, Queen of Navarre gave birth to the Charles, Prince of Viana in the keep of Peñafiel in 1421.

The castle currently houses a wine museum.

== Gallery ==
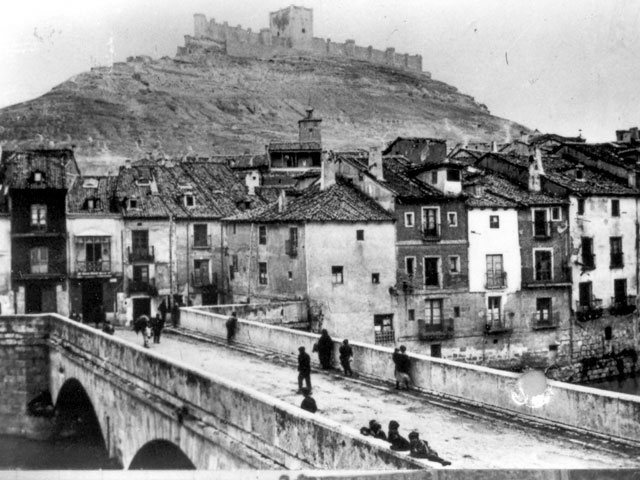
Antique photo

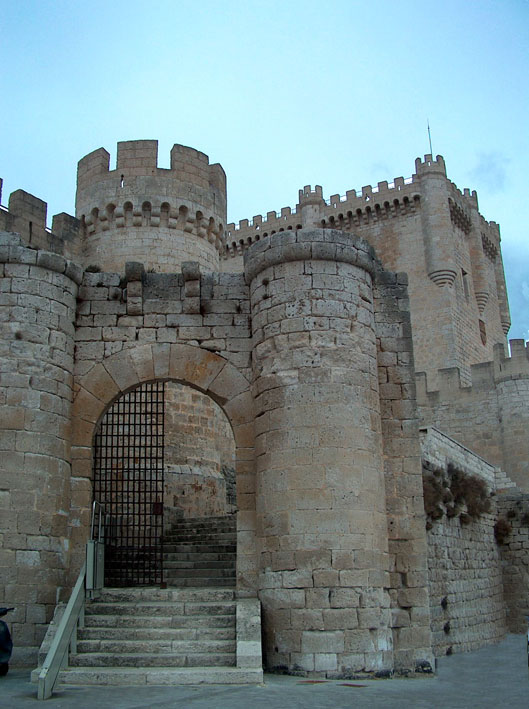
Main entrance

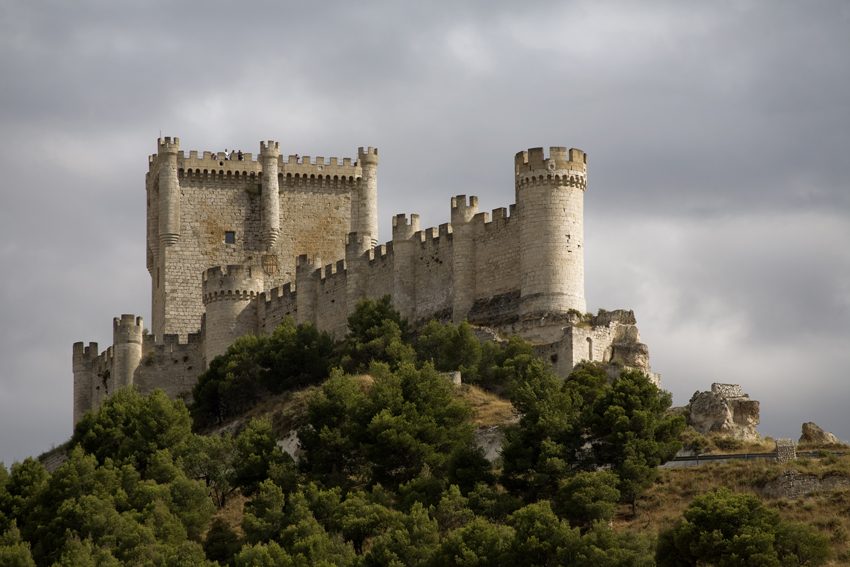
Castle "prow" view

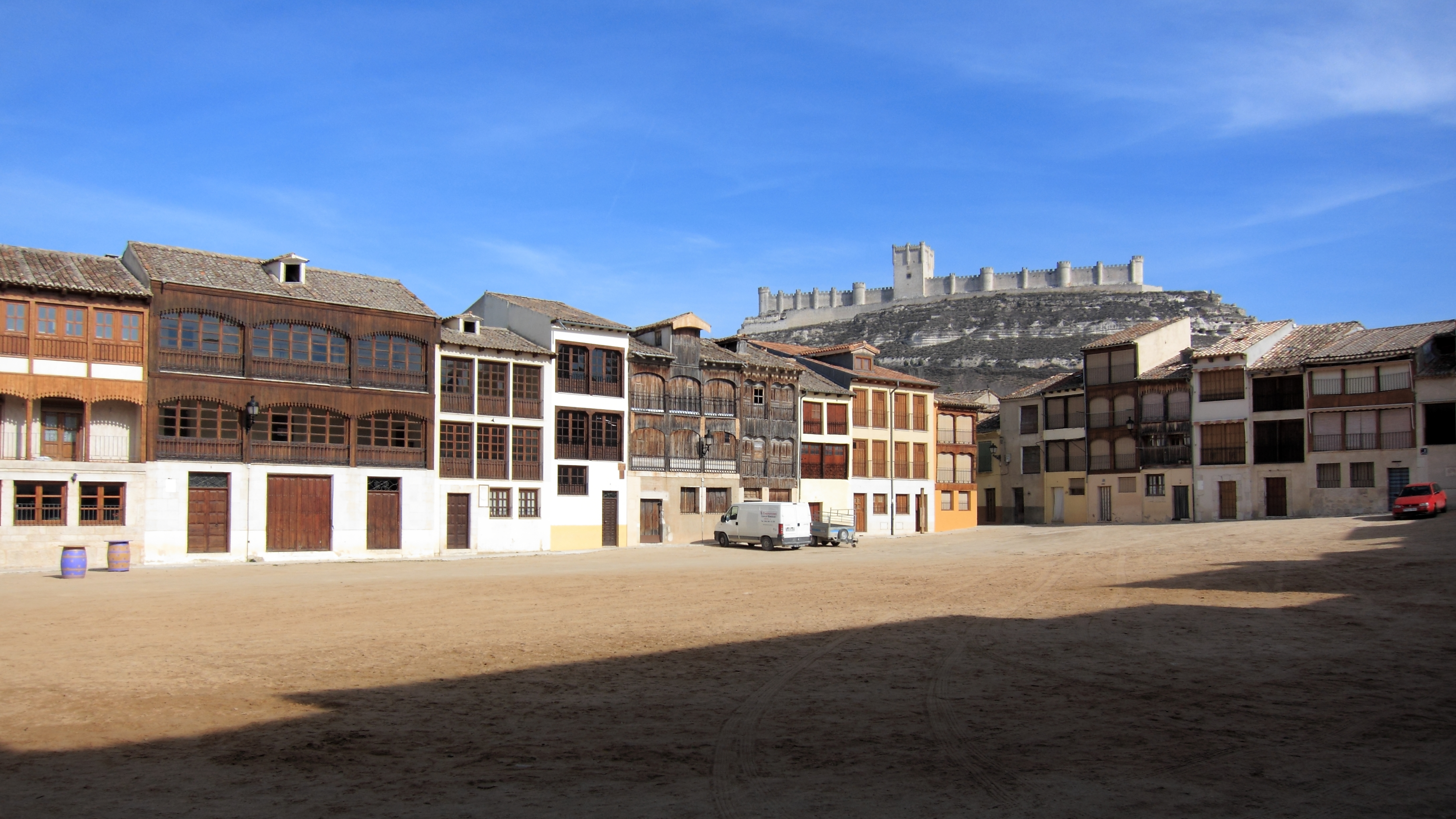
View from Plaza del Coso

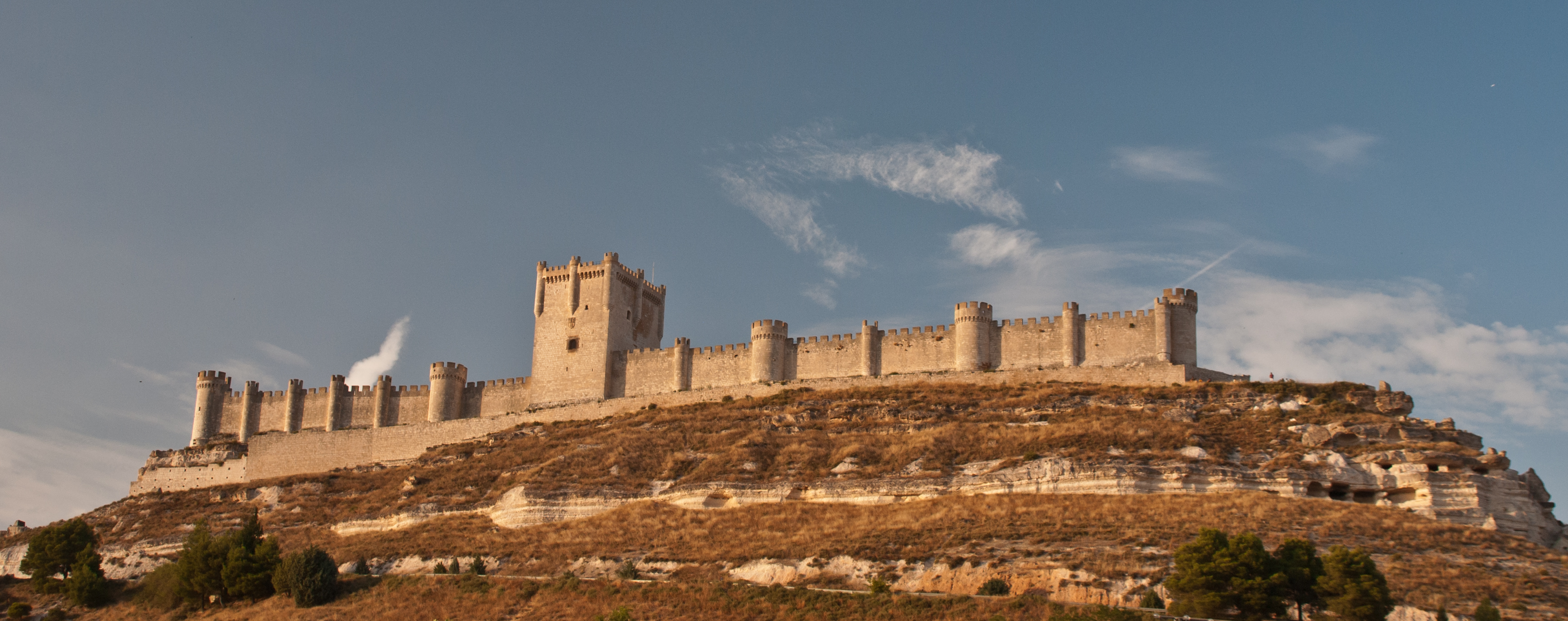
Panoramic view of the side

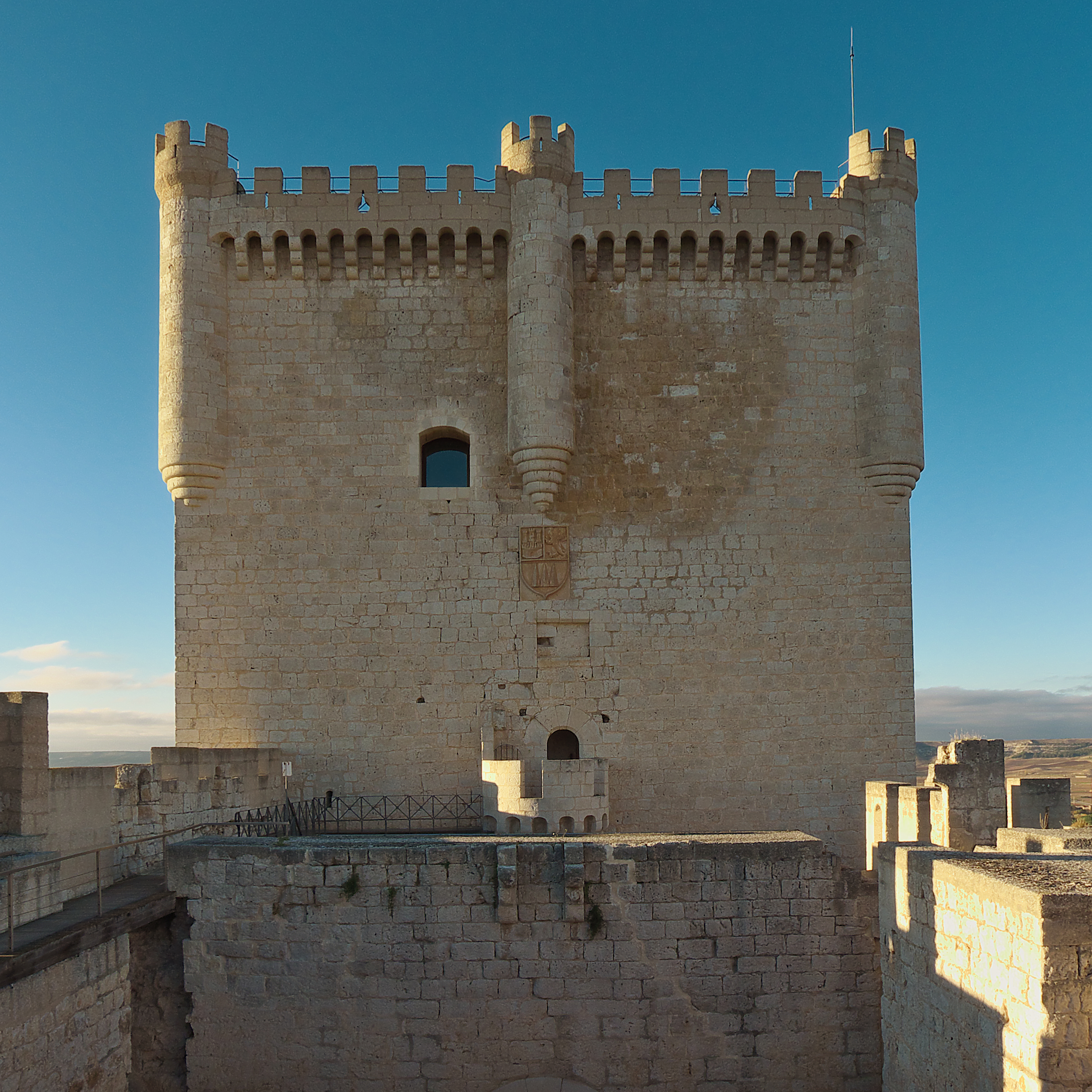
Keep

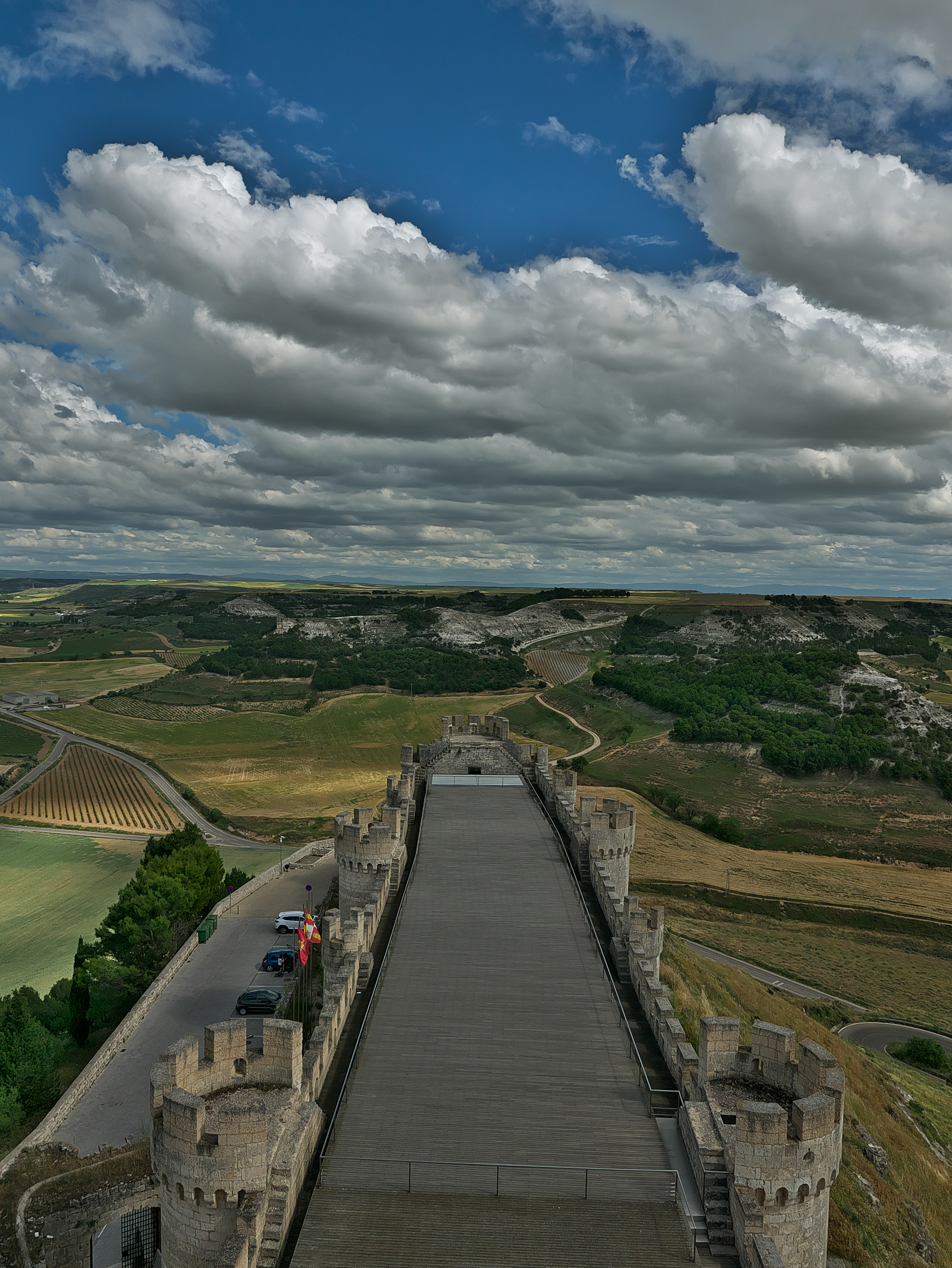
Right-side view from the central tower

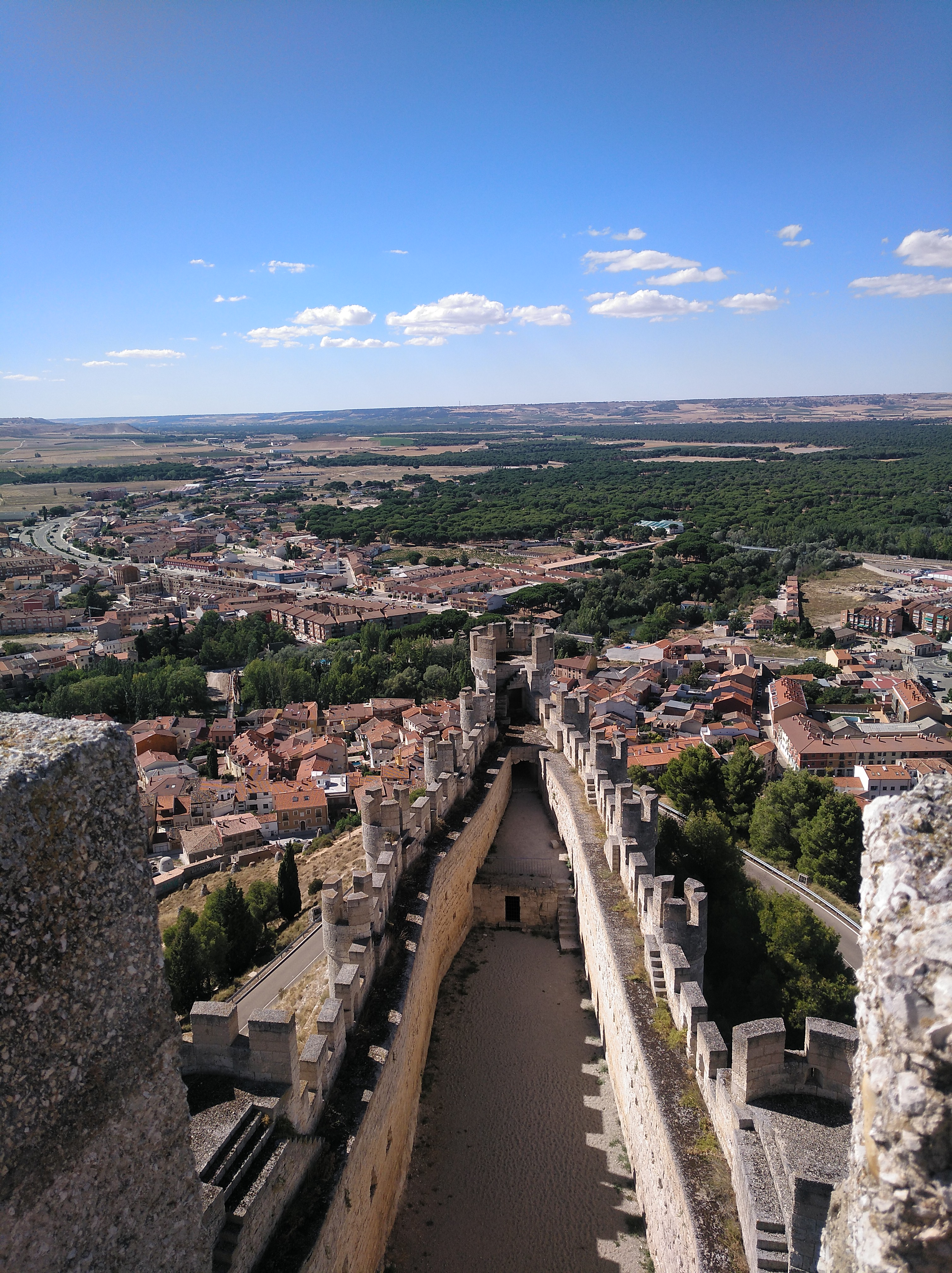
Left-side view from the central tower

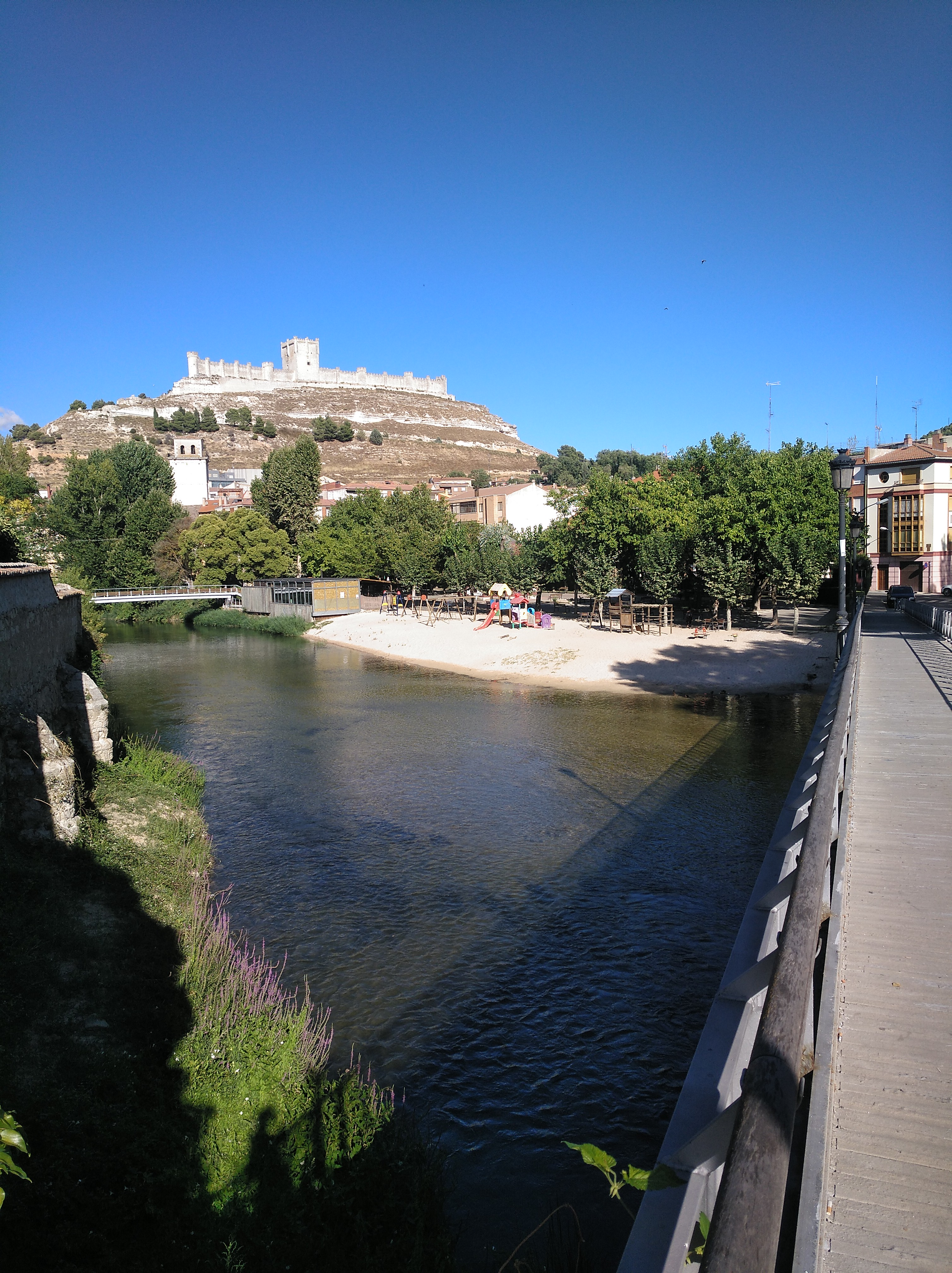
Peñafiel Castle from the Duratón river

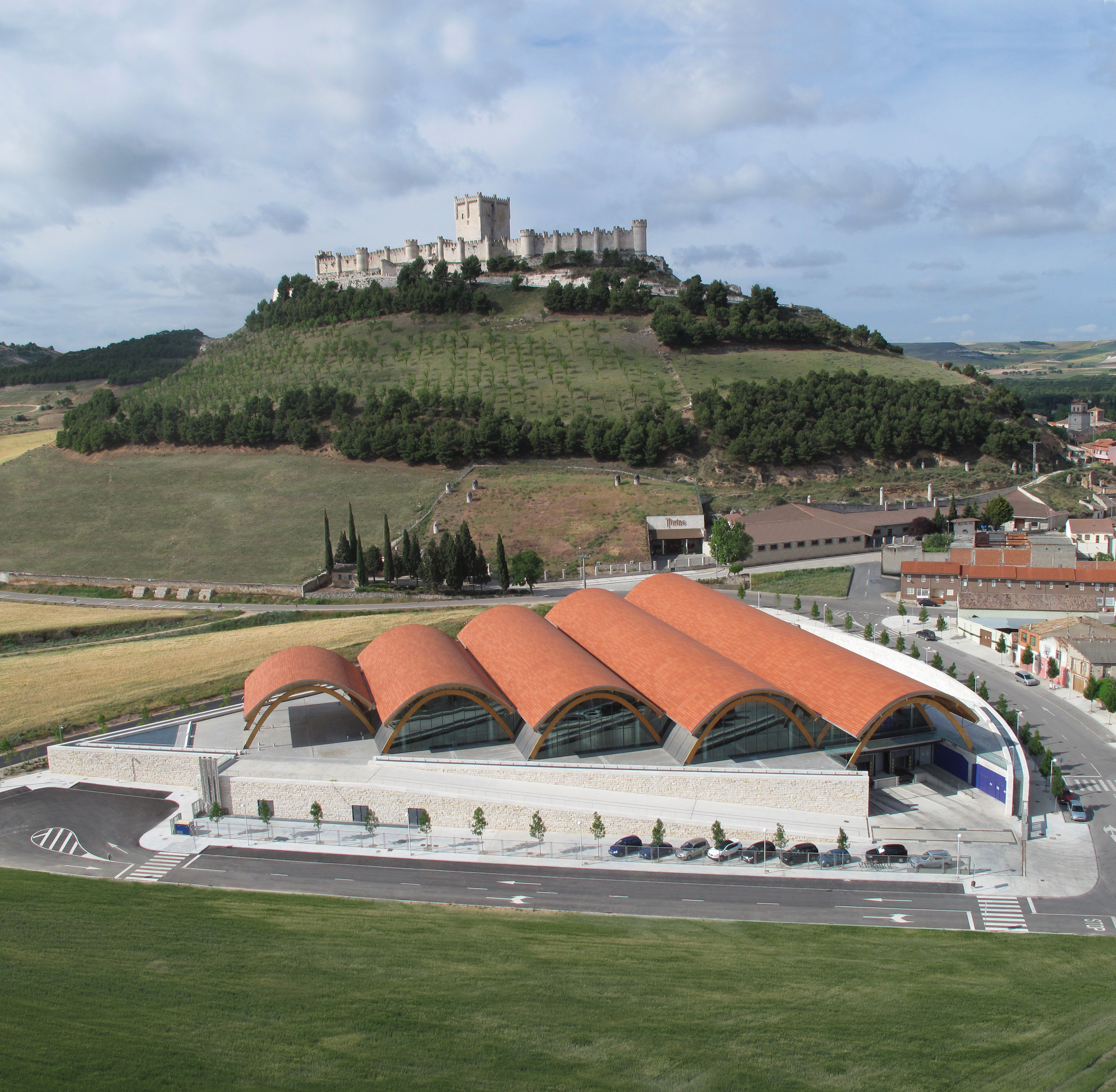
Bodegas Protos ("Protos Wineries", designed by Richard Rogers) and castle

== See also ==
- Peñafiel, Spain (town)
- Plaza del Coso
