= Plaza del Coso =

Coordinates: 41°36′N 4°07′W

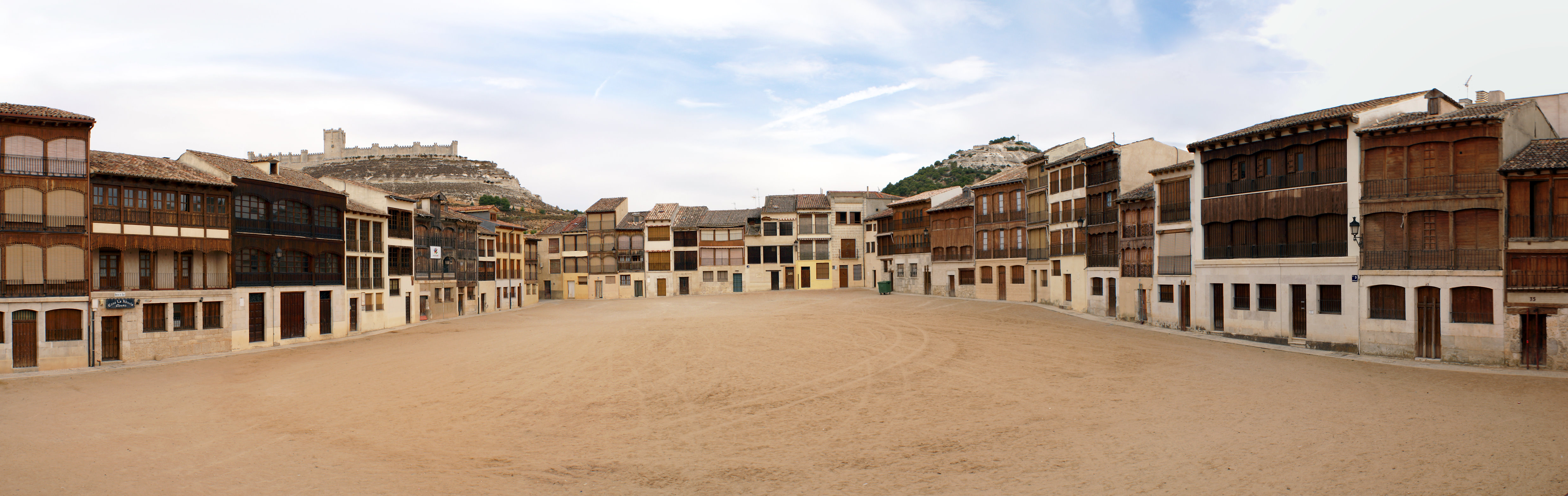
Panorama of the Plaza del Coso, with the top of Peñafiel Castle in the background.

The Plaza del Coso is an urban plaza in the locality of Peñafiel, in Valladolid Province, in the autonomous community of Castile and León, Spain.

During the year it serves as a bullring during the Festival of San Roque in August, and provides a place for the Descent of the Angel Festival (Bajada del Ángel), on Resurrection Sunday.

The square is commonly known as "Corro" or "Corro of the Bulls", and has been documented as existing since the Middle Ages. The square is surrounded by 48 buildings, is accessed by two streets, and has an area of 3,500 m^{2}. The balconies of the plaza are lintelled, and were built between the 18th and 19th centuries. The balconies are made from wood, and decorated with arabesque The balconies have been used since their creation to watch the shows.

== Gallery ==
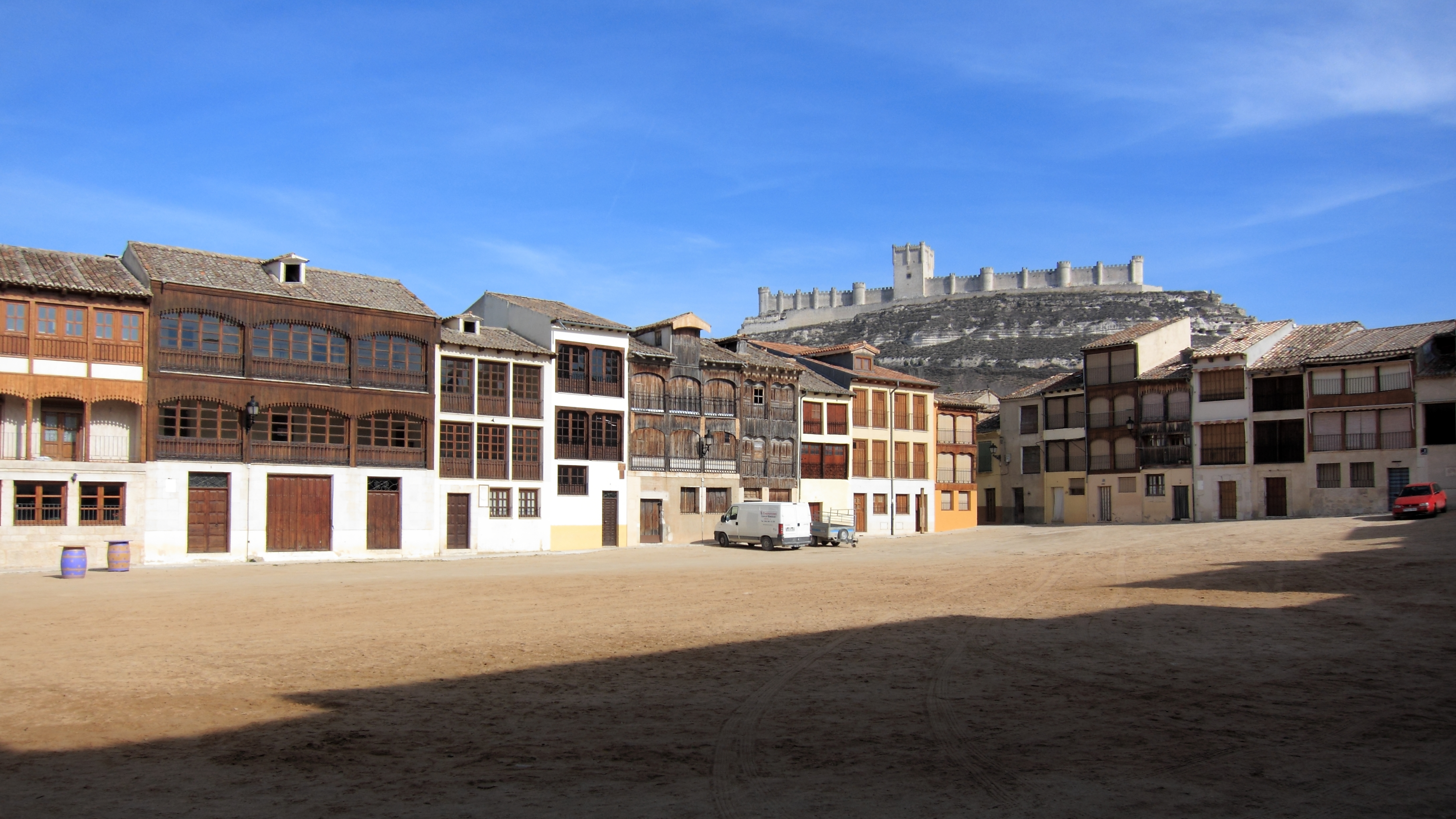
Plaza del Coso

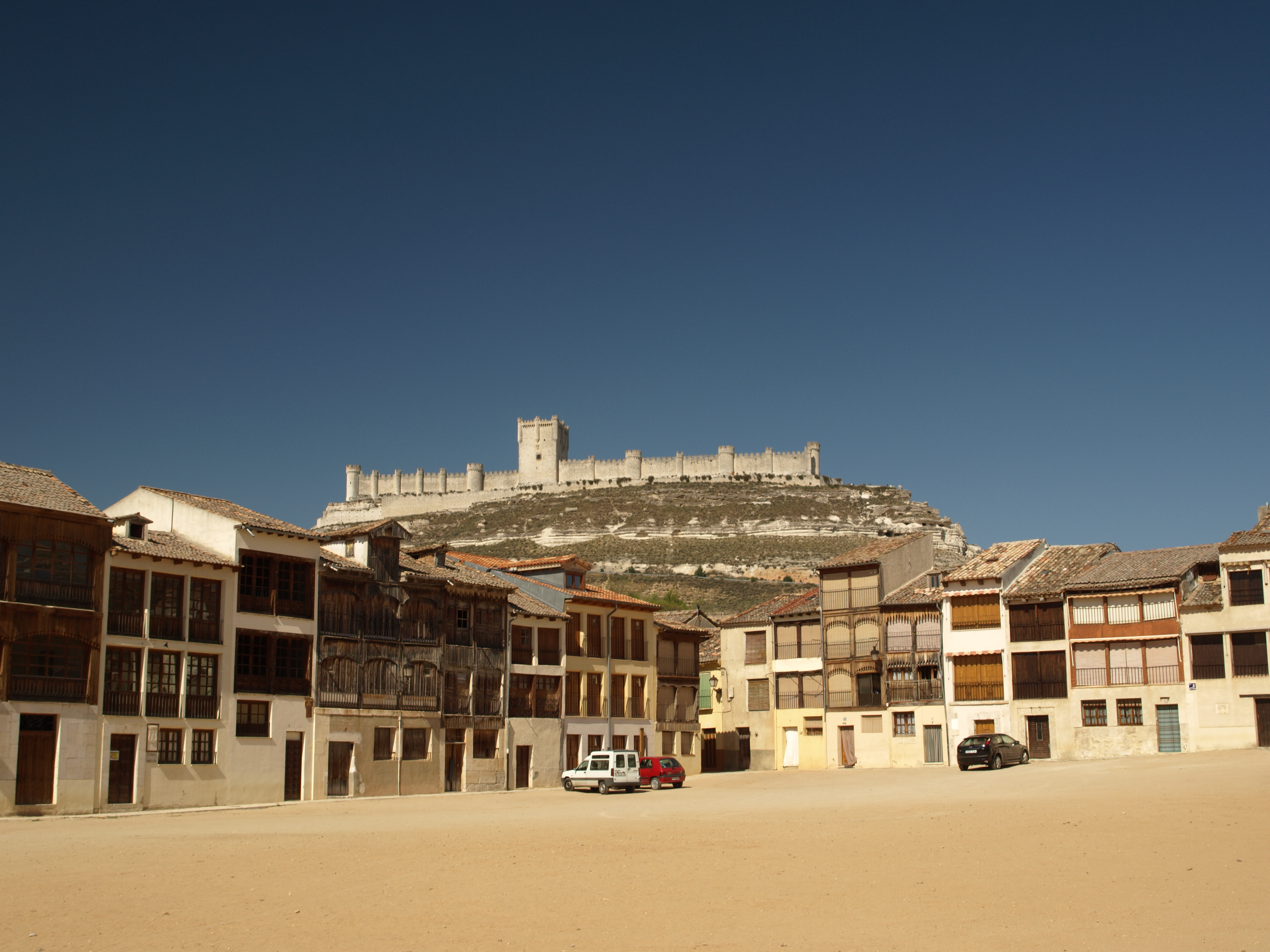
Plaza del Coso

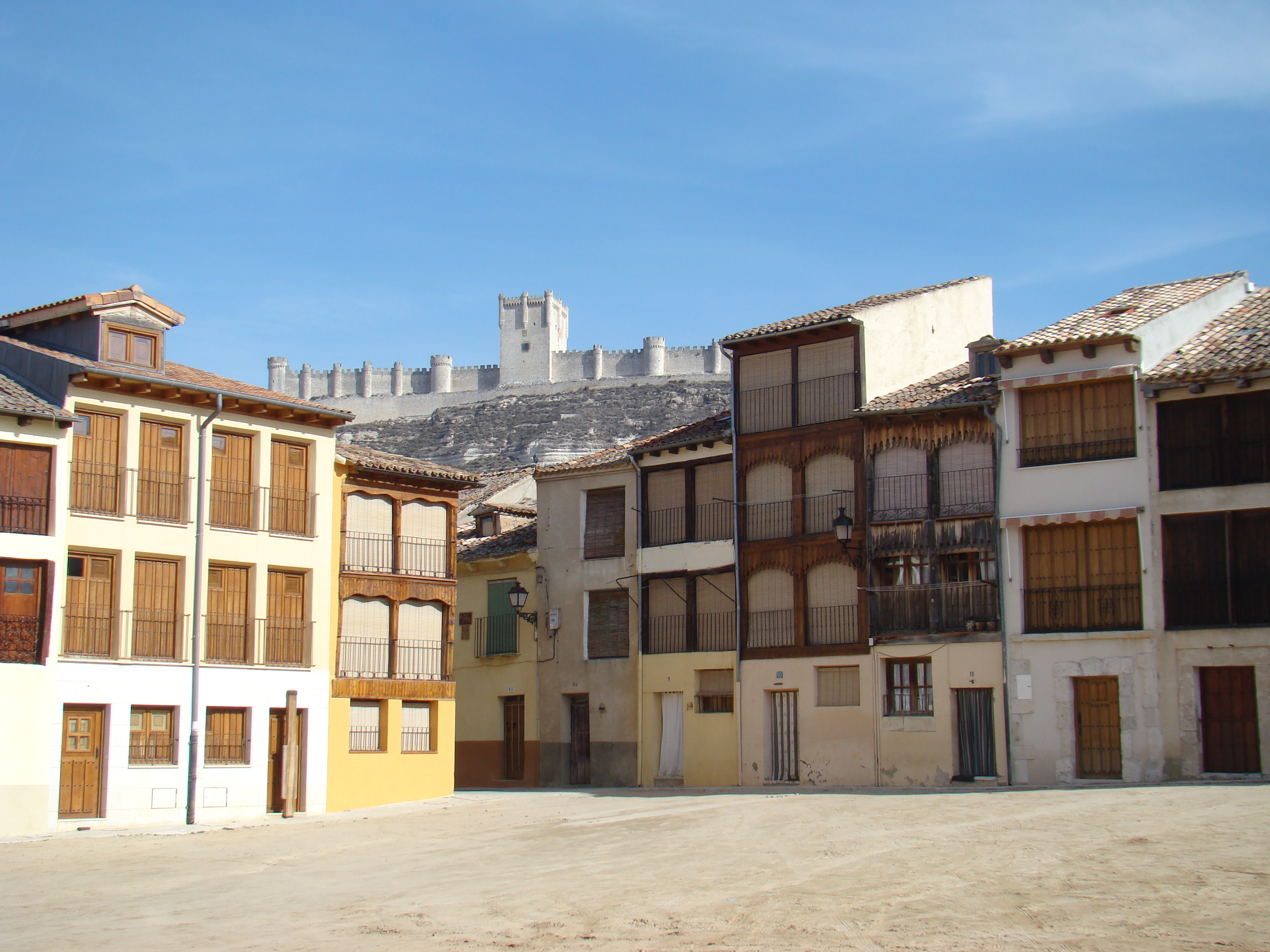
Plaza del Coso

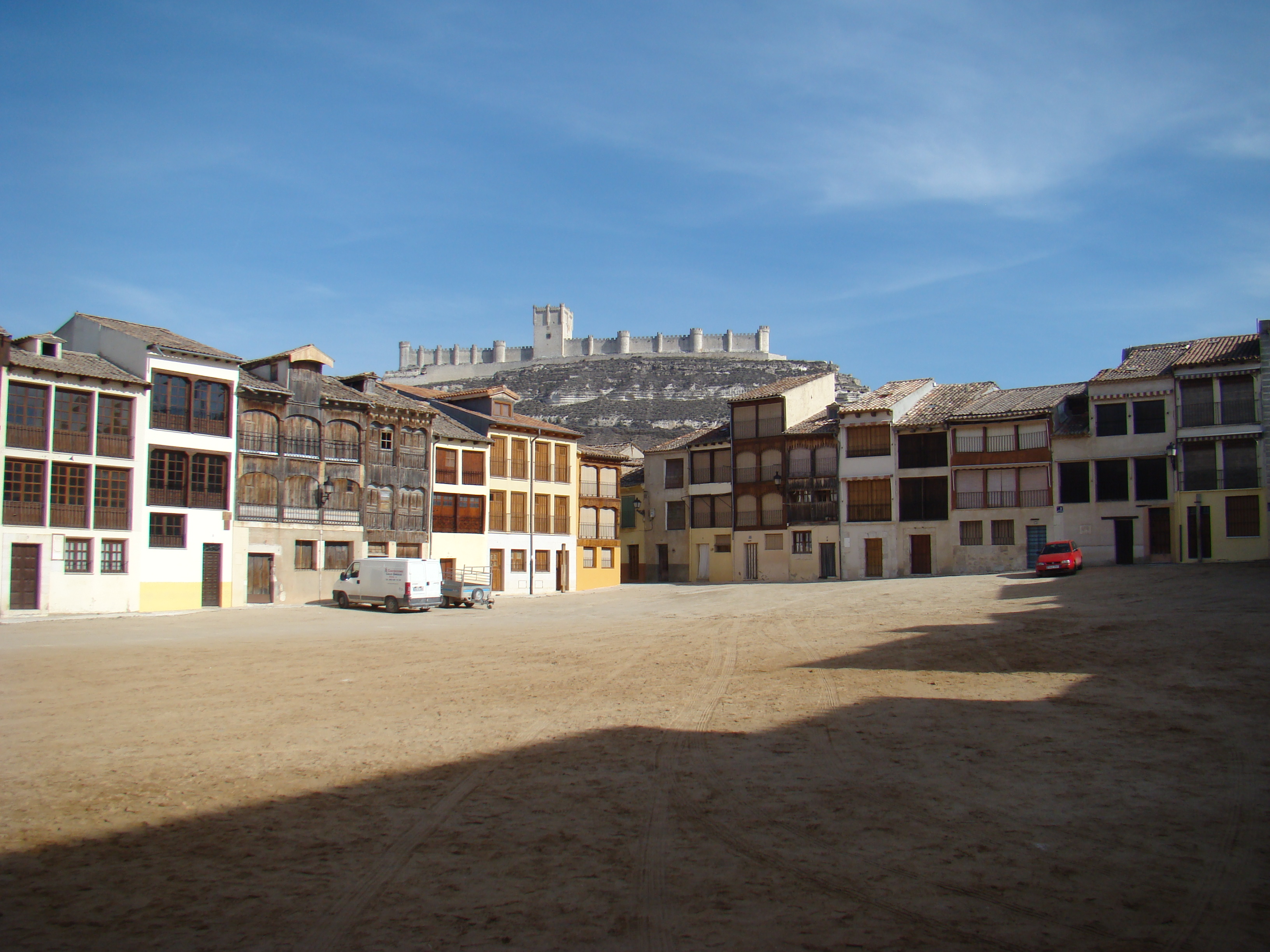
Plaza del Coso

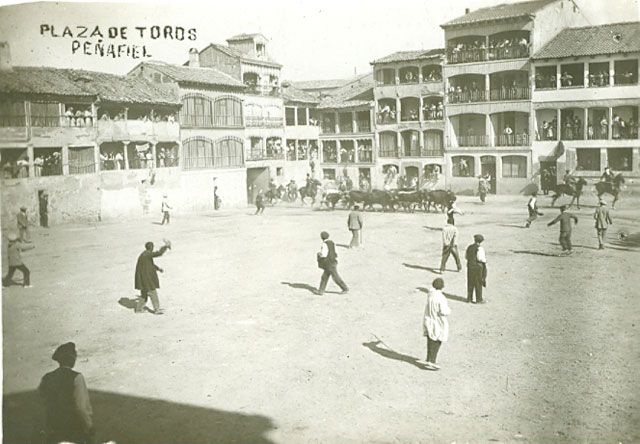
Early 20th century

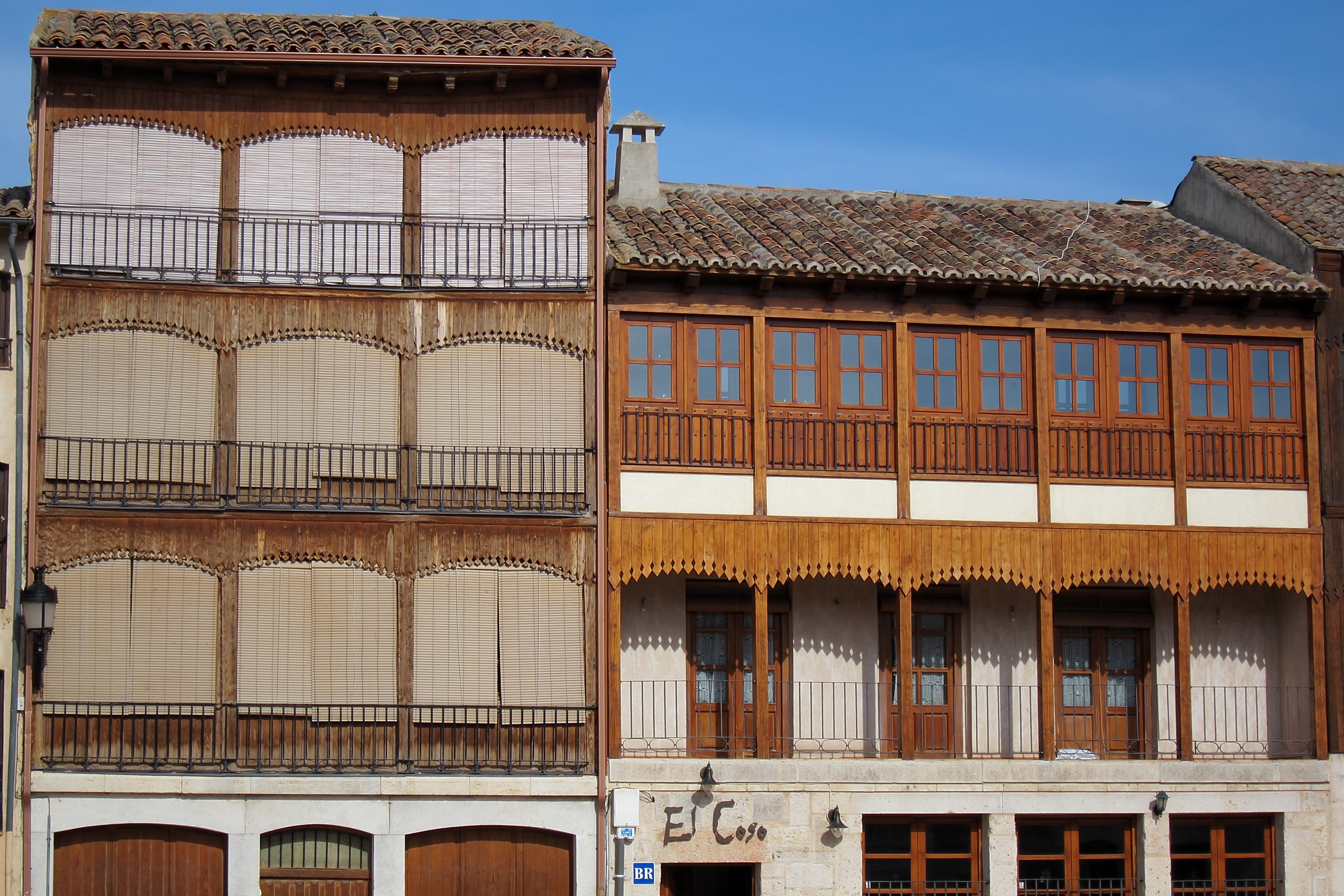
House

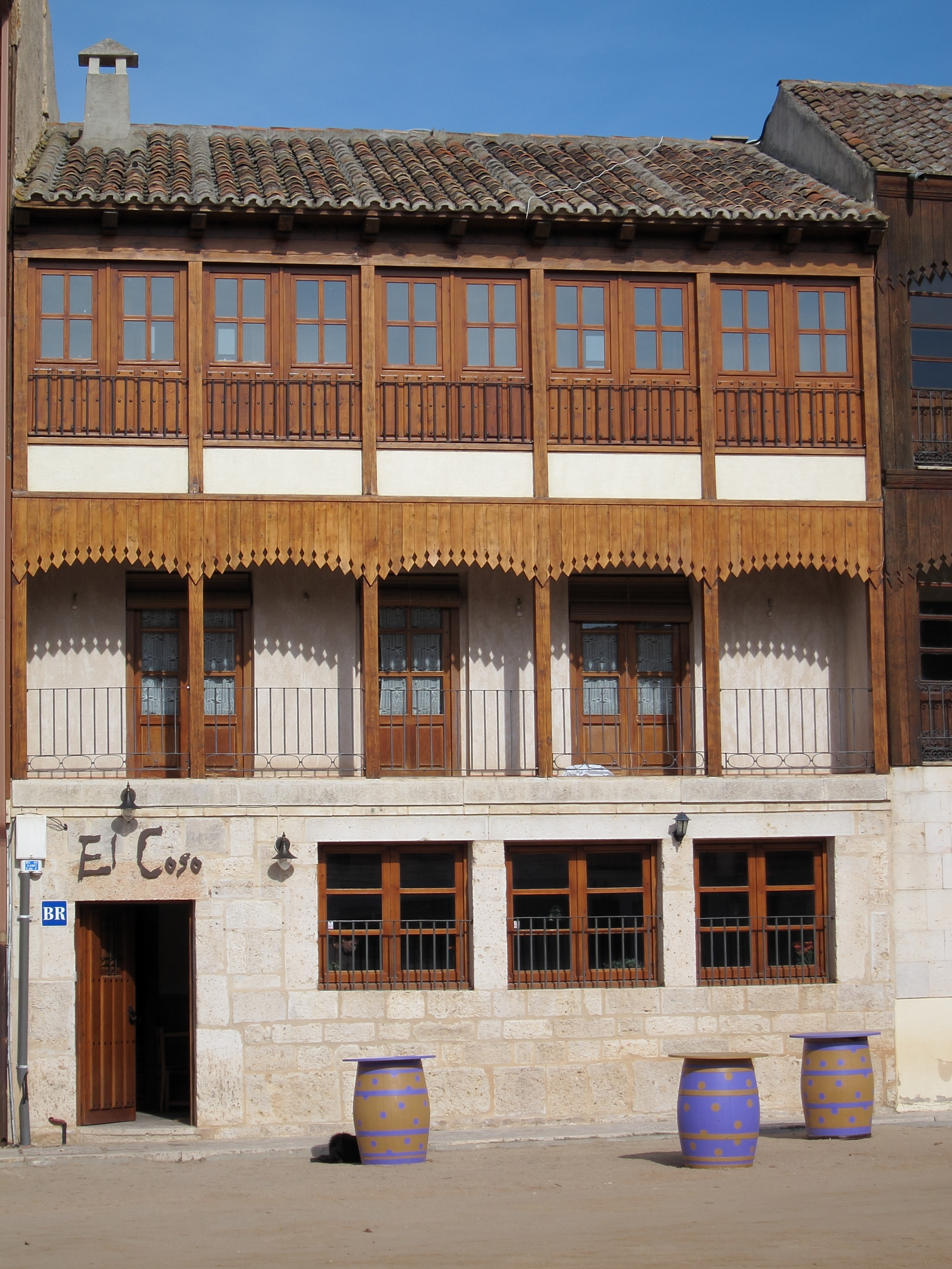
House
