= Blanche of France, Infanta of Castile =

Blanche of France
- Infanta of Castile
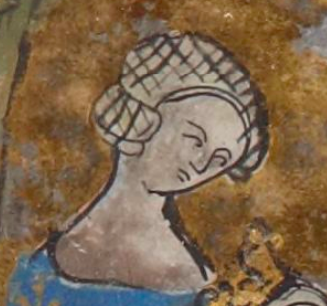
- Born: 1253; Jaffa, County of Jaffa and Ascalon
- Died: 1323 (aged 69–70); Paris, Kingdom of France
- Burial: Cordeliers Convent, Paris
- Spouse: Ferdinand de la Cerda, Infante of Castile (m. 1269; died 1275)
- Issue: Alfonso de la Cerda of Castile; Ferdinand de la Cerda of Castile
- House: Capet
- Father: Louis IX of France
- Mother: Margaret of Provence

Blanche of France (French: Blanche de France) (1253–1323) was a daughter of King Louis IX of France and Margaret of Provence.

== Biography ==
Blanche was born in 1253 in Jaffa, County of Jaffa and Ascalon during the Seventh Crusade led by her father, Louis IX of France.

In November 1269, she married Ferdinand de la Cerda, Infante of Castile, eldest son of Alfonso X of Castile and Violant of Aragon. They had:

- Alfonso (1270–1333), who married Mahaut, daughter of John I of Brienne, Count of Eu. They had four sons and three daughters.
- Ferdinand (1275–1322), who married Juana Núñez de Lara, called "la Palomilla", Lady of Lara and Herrera, daughter of Juan Núñez I de Lara and Teresa Álvarez de Azagra. They had one son and three daughters. One daughter, Blanca de La Cerda y Lara, was the mother-in-law of King Henry II of Castile.

Ferdinand predeceased his father in 1275 at Ciudad Real. Blanche and Ferdinand's sons did not inherit the throne of their grandfather, since their uncle, the second son, Sancho, enforced his claim, even by rebelling. Blanche's brother Philip warned Sancho that he would invade Castile on behalf of his two nephews.

Blanche left Castile never to return. Her sons were sent to live with their grandmother Violant of Aragon who had them sent to the fortress of Xàtiva so they would be safe from Sancho.

Blanche died at the Monastère des Clarisses de l’Ave Maria, in Paris, in 1323.

== Sources ==
- Doubleday, Simon R. (2015). The Wise King: A Christian Prince, Muslim Spain, and the Birth of the Renaissance. Basic Books. ISBN 978-0465066995.
- Linehan, Peter (2008). Spain, 1157-1300: A Partible Inheritance. Wiley.
