= Juan Manuel =

Duke of Peñafiel & Spanish writer (1282-1348)

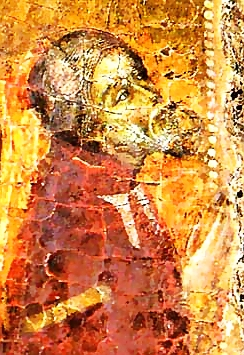
- Don Juan Manuel, Prince of Villena
- Born: 5 May 1282; Escalona
- Died: 13 June 1348 (aged 66); Córdoba
- Noble family: Castilian House of Ivrea
- Spouses: Elizabeth of Majorca; Constance of Aragon; Blanca de La Cerda y Lara
- Issue: Constanza, Queen of Castile; Fernando, 1st Duke of Villena; Juana, Queen of Castile; Illegitimate: Sancho, 1st Lord of Carcelén and Montealegre; Enrique, 1st Count of Seia
- Father: Manuel of Castile
- Mother: Beatrice of Savoy

Don Juan Manuel (5 May 1282 – 13 June 1348) was a Spanish medieval writer, nephew of Alfonso X of Castile, son of Manuel of Castile and Beatrice of Savoy. He inherited from his father the great Lordship of Villena, receiving the titles of Lord, Duke and lastly Prince of Villena. He married three times, choosing his wives for political and economic convenience, and worked to match his children with partners associated with royalty. Juan Manuel became one of the richest and most powerful men of his time, coining his own currency as the kings did. During his life, he was criticised for choosing literature as his vocation, an activity thought inferior for a nobleman of such prestige.

Some confusion exists about his names and titles. Juan Manuel often refers to himself in his books as "Don Juan, son of infante don Manuel". But some 19th and early 20th century scholars started calling him infante, a title he did not possess, as in medieval Castile only the sons of kings were called infantes (and he was the grandson of Fernando III). The same applies for the title of Duke and Prince of Villena, that he received from Alfonso IV and Pedro IV of Aragón. As these titles follow the Aragonese nobiliary traditions, they were of little interest to the Castilian author, to the point that he never used them in his writings or correspondence, and they have only been associated to him by a handful of scholars.

== Biography ==
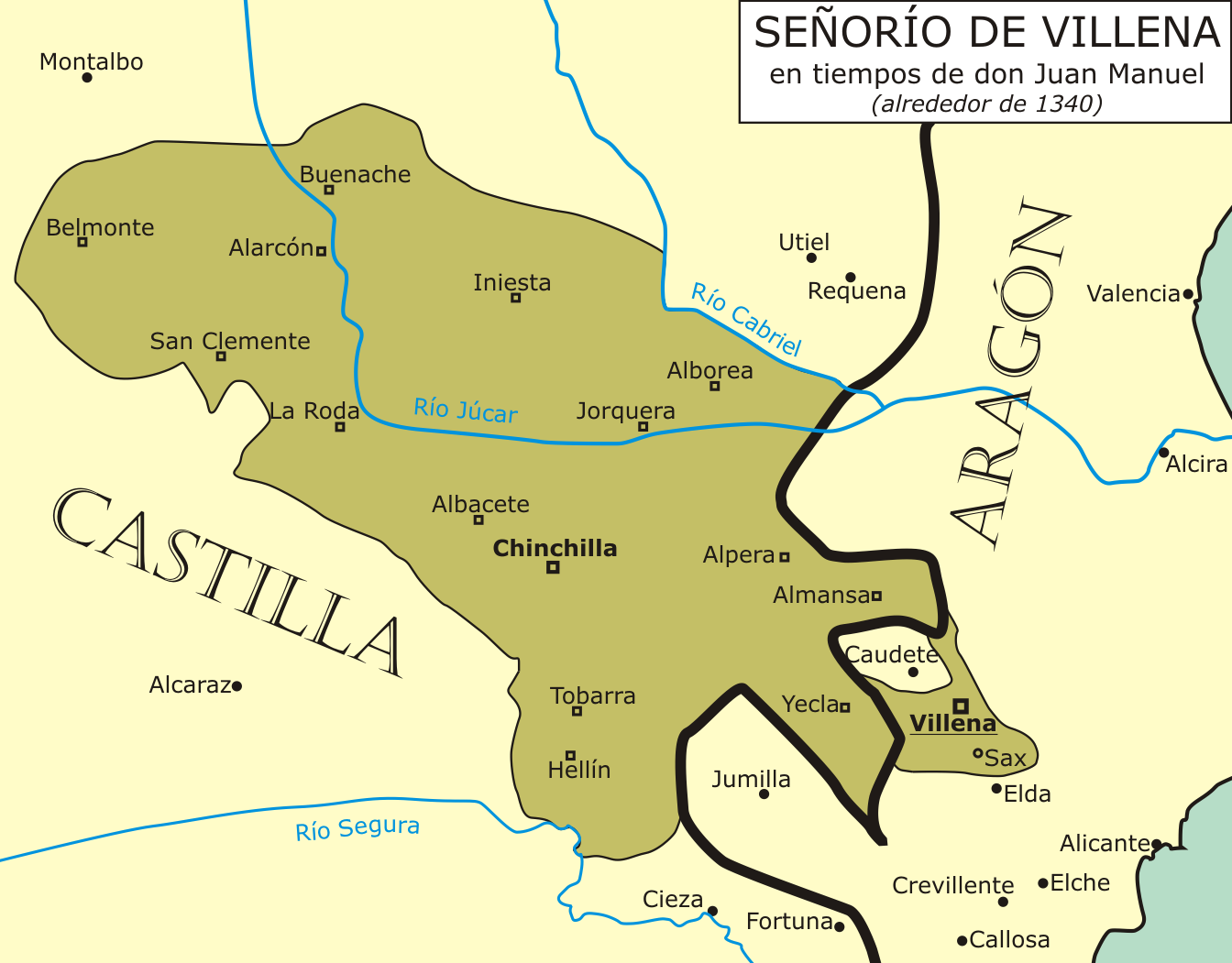
Extension of the Seigneury of Villena at the time of Juan Manuel, around the year 1340.

Juan Manuel was born in the Castle of Escalona, in what is now the province of Toledo. He was a son of Manuel of Castile (son of Ferdinand III of Castile) and his second wife Beatrice of Savoy. His father died in 1283, and Juan was educated at the court of his cousin, Sancho IV, with whom his abilities made him a favourite. With the death of his mother in 1292, Juan Manuel became duke of Peñafiel. Juan Manuel was trained in arts such as equestrianism, hunting, and fencing, and in addition learned Latin, history, law, and theology. At the age of twelve, he fought to repel the attack of the Moors from Granada to Murcia.

In 1304 he was entrusted by the queen mother, Doña María de Molina, to conduct political negotiations with James II of Aragon on behalf of her son, Ferdinand IV, then under age. The diplomacy was successful and Juan Manuel's marriage to James II's daughter, Constance, added to his prestige.

Juan Manuel gave the hand of his daughter Constanza in marriage to Alfonso XI, with whom he had constant confrontations. However, the king kept Constanza as a prisoner in the Castle of Toro for unclear reasons. This incident angered Juan Manuel, who decided to turn against Alfonso. He declared war on the monarch, beginning a long confrontation.

On the death of his wife Constance in 1327, Don Juan Manuel strengthened his position by marrying Doña Blanca de La Cerda y Lara; he secured the support of Juan Núñez, alférez of Castile, and entered into an alliance with Muhammed IV, Sultan of Granada. This formidable coalition compelled Alfonso XI to sue for terms, which he accepted in 1328 without any serious intention of complying with them. War speedily broke out anew, and lasted until 1331 when Alfonso invited Juan Manuel and Juan Nuñez to a banquet at Villahumbrales with the intention, it was believed, of assassinating them; the plot failed, and Don Juan Manuel joined forces with Alfonso IV of Aragon. He was besieged by Alfonso at Garci-Nuñez, whence he escaped on 30 July 1336, fled into exile, and kept the rebellion alive until 1338.

Finally, the Pope brought about reconciliation between Juan Manuel and Alfonso XI. This reconciliation was not complete until 1340, when Juan Manuel and Alfonso allied against the Muslims in the Battle of Río Salado, taking the city of Algeciras. After these events, Juan Manuel left political life and retired to Castillo de Garcimuñoz, where he spent his last years focused on literature. Proud of his works, he decided to compile them all in a single volume. This compilation was destroyed in a fire, with no known copy preserved.

Juan Manuel died at Córdoba in 1348, at the age of sixty-six.

== Works ==
House of Manuel Coat of Arms.

Throughout his life, he wrote approximately thirteen books, of which only eight are preserved today. These works are predominantly didactic. Following the path of his uncle, Alfonso X of Castile, Juan Manuel wrote in Castilian, a peculiarity in times when Latin was the official language for educated writing. He wrote in the vernacular to facilitate access to literature for a greater number of Castilian readers.

While his writings were directed largely to a literate class, it was nonetheless his assumption that they would be read aloud, as was common during the Middle Ages. He is ever conscious of propriety, and speaks carefully, both because of his elevated rank, and in case women or children should hear what he has written. His works reflect his character, ambitions, and beliefs, so that in many ways they are a mirror of his time and circumstances.

Juan Manuel's work is marked by a great preoccupation both with the practical and the spiritual life, and is directed not only to the nobility, but also to lower estates, since much of his work speaks not only of the duties of lords, but of their vassals as well. While his work is often classified under the general Medieval rubric of "the education of princes" it also begins to approach the Machiavellianism which is more characteristic of the Renaissance, by virtue of its dedication to the astute art of governing.

=== Chronological summary ===
Of Juan Manuel's surviving writings:

- Crónica abreviada, 'Abbreviated Chronicle' was compiled between 1319 and 1325.
- The Libro de la caza, 'Book of the Hunt' was written between 1320 and 1329; and during this period of nine years the Crónica de España, 'Chronicle of Spain', the Crónica complida, 'Complete Chronicle', and the Tratado sobre las armas, 'Treatise about the Weapons' were produced.
- The Libro del cavallero et del escudero, 'Book of the Knight and the Squire' was finished before the end of 1326. It is striking for its curious and varied erudition of the turbulent prince who weaves his personal experiences with historical or legendary incidents, with reminiscences of Aesop and Phaedrus, with the Disciplina clericalis, with Kalilah and Dimnah, with various Oriental traditions, and with the material of anecdotic literature which he embodies in the Libro de Patronio, best known by the title of El Conde Lucanor.
- The first book of the Libro de los estados, 'Book of the Estates' was finished on 22 May 1330, while the second was begun five days later. The author deliberately fuses history and fiction, which serves as a defense of his person and estate against the monarch, Alfonso XI's, encroachment upon the established rights and privileges of the upper nobility.
- The first book of El Conde Lucanor was written in 1328, the second in 1330, and the fourth is dated 12 June 1335.
- The devout Treatise on the Virgin, dedicated to the prior of the monastery at Peñafiel, to which Don Juan Manuel bequeathed his manuscripts, is of uncertain date, but it seems probable that the Libro de los frailes predicadores, 'Book of the Preaching Friars' is slightly later than the Libro de los estados; that the Libro de los castigos, 'Book of the Punishments' (left unfinished, and therefore known by the alternative title of Libro infinido, 'Unfinished Book') was written not later than 1333, and that the treatise De las maneras de amor, 'About the Ways of Love' was composed between 1334 and 1337.

Among his lost works, the Libro de los sabios, 'Book of the Wise Men', a treatise called 'Engaños de guerra, 'Deceptions of War' and the Libro de cantares, 'Book of Songs', a collection of verses, were composed between 1320 and 1327; but they have disappeared together with the Libro de la caballería, 'Book of the Chivalry' (written during the winter of 1326), and the Reglas cómo se debe trovar, 'Rules How to Make Poetry', a metrical treatise assigned to 1328–1334.

=== El Conde Lucanor ===
El Conde Lucanor, or Tales of Count Lucanor (the name Lucanor being taken from the prose Tristan), also entitled the Libro de enxemplos, 'Book of exempla', was first printed by Gonzalo Argote de Molina at Seville in 1575, and it revealed Don Juan Manuel as a master in the art of prose composition, and as the predecessor of Boccaccio in the province of romantic narrative. The structure of stories reflects the ordinances and hierarchical structuring of the medieval world. In the first parts a young nobleman, Lucanor, proposes an abstract problem to Patronio; later, he gives an apologue which extracts the solution from Patronio's tale, applying it to himself. Juan Manuel concludes the story with a short verse, condensing the moral of the story into short, concrete statements.

It is essentially the production of a conscious artist, deliberative and selective in his methods. Don Juan Manuel naturalizes the Eastern apologue in Spain, and by the laconic picturesqueness of his expression imports a new quality into Spanish prose which attains its full development in the hands of Juan de Valdés and Cervantes. Some of his themes are utilized for dramatic purposes by Lope de Vega in La Pobreza estimada, 'The Esteemed Poverty', by Juan Ruiz de Alarcón in La Prueba de las promesas, 'The Test of the Promises', by Calderón in Life is a Dream, and by José de Cañizares in Don Juan de Espina en Milán, 'Don Juan de Espina in Milan'; there is an evident, though remote, relation between the tale of the mancebo que casó con una mujer muy fuerte y muy brava, 'young man who married a very strong and very furious woman' and The Taming of the Shrew; and a more direct connection exists between some of Don Juan Manuel's enxemplos and some of Hans Christian Andersen's fairy tales.

== Children ==
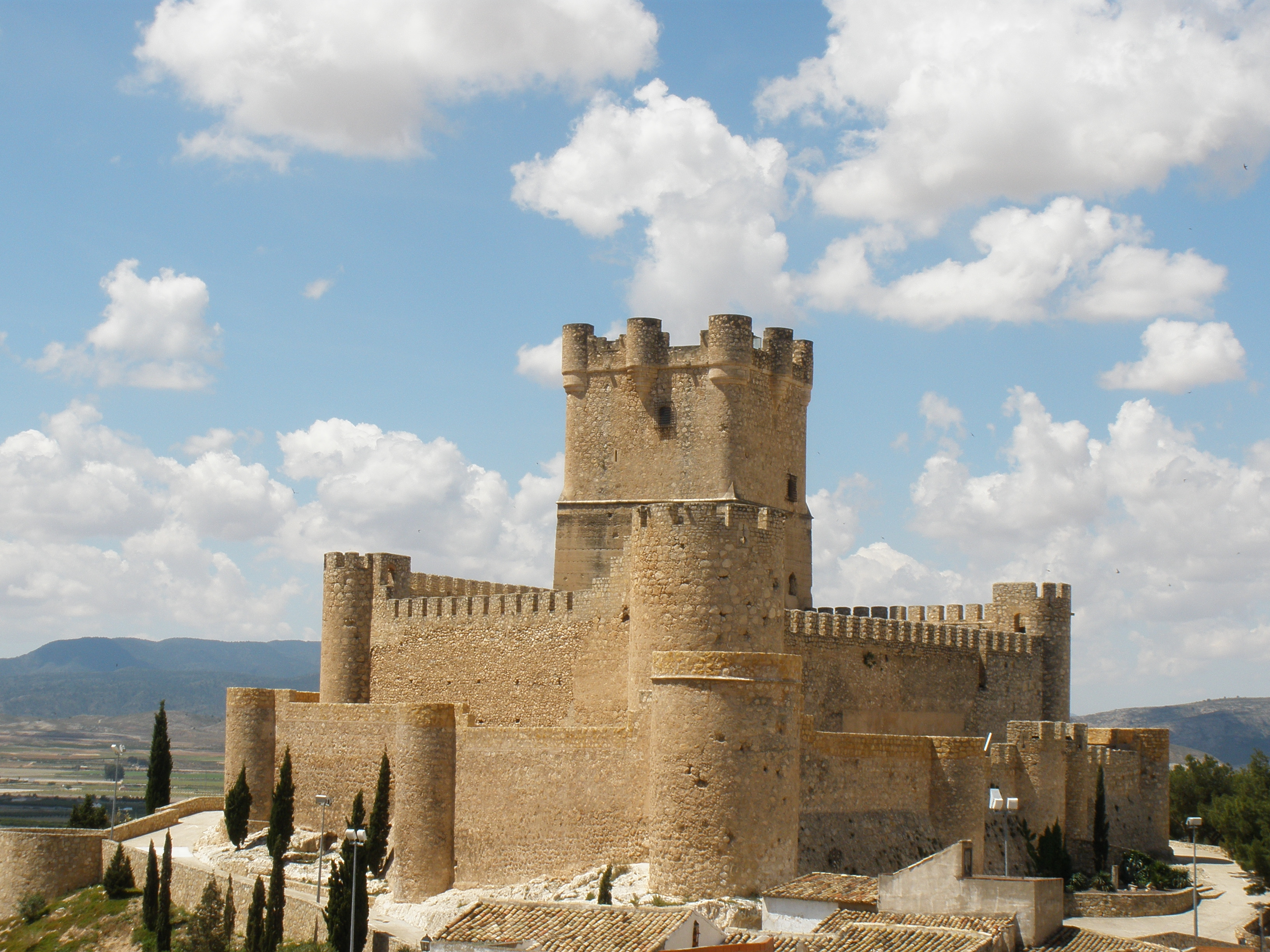
Castle of Villena, capital of Seigneury of Villena.

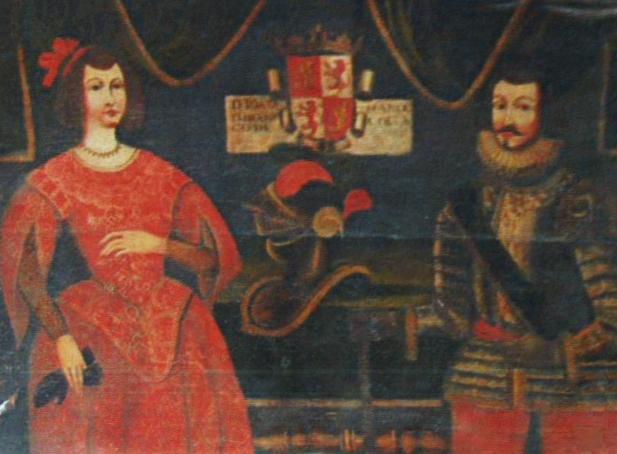
Blanca de La Cerda and Don Juan Manuel, in a 17th-century Portuguese painting series depicting the ancestors of the Manuel family (Ficalho Palace, Serpa, Portugal)

His first wife was Elizabeth of Majorca, daughter of James II of Majorca. She died around 1301 and they had no children.

With Constance of Aragon, daughter of James II of Aragon:

- Constanza Manuel of Villena (c. 1318 – 1349), who first married Alfonso XI of Castile in 1325 before the marriage was annulled in 1327. She married her second husband Infante Peter of Portugal in 1340.
- Beatrice Manuel of Villena, died young.
- Manuel of Villena, died young.

With Blanca de la Cerda y Lara, daughter of Fernando de la Cerda:

- Fernando Manuel of Villena (died c. 1350), Lord of Escalona, Peñafiel and Villena, who married in 1346 Joan, a daughter of Ramón Berenguer, Count of Ampurias, himself a younger son of James II of Aragon. The couple had a daughter, Blanca Manuel (c. 1348 – 1361), heiress of Villena, Escalona and Peñafiel.
- Juana Manuel of Villena (1339–1381), who married in 1350 Henry II of Castile and became Queen of Castile.

Illegitimate with Inés de Castañeda:

- Sancho Manuel of Villena (1320–1347),
- Enrique Manuel of Villena (1340–1390), count of Seia and lord of Sintra.

== Ancestors ==
Ancestors of Juan Manuel

8. Alfonso IX of León
4. Ferdinand III of Castile
9. Berengaria of Castile
2. Manuel of Castile
10. Philip of Swabia
5. Elisabeth of Hohenstaufen
11. Irene Angelina
1. Juan Manuel, Prince of Villena
12. Thomas I of Savoy
6. Amadeus IV, Count of Savoy
13. Margaret of Geneva
3. Beatrice of Savoy
14. Barral of Baux
7. Cecilia of Baux
15. Sibylle d'Anduze

== See also ==
- Spanish literature

== Sources ==
- Ayerbe-Chaux, Reinaldo. Count Lucanor: Traditional matter and originality creadorá. Madrid: J. Porrúa Turanzas, 1975.
- Biglieri, Aníbal A. Towards a poetic one of the didactic story: Eight studies on count Lucanor. Chapel Hill: UNC Dept. of Romance Languages, 1989.
- Flory, David. The Count Lucanor: Don Juan Manuel within his historical context. Madrid: Pliegos, 1995.
- Giménez Soler, Andrés. Don Juan Manuel. Biography and critical study. Zaragoza: F. Martinez, 1932.
- Hammer, Michael Floyd. "Framing the Reader: Exemplarity and Ethics in the Manuscripts of the 'Count Lucanor'." Ph.D. University of California at Los Angeles, 2004.
- Lida de Malkiel, Maria Rosa. "Three notes on Don Juan Manuel." Romance Philology 4,2-3 (1950): 155-94.
- Wacks, David A. "Don Yllán and the Egyptian Sorcerer: Vernacular commonality and literary diversity in medieval Castile." Sefarad 65,2 (2005): 413-33.
- MacPherson, Ian. ed. Juan Manuel: A Selection. London: Tamesis Texts Limited, 1980.
- Peters, Michael F., Jr. "Juan Manuel’s Libro de los estados: fictive history, estate theory, and disputes with Alfonso XI." Journal of Medieval Iberian Studies 18.1 (2025): 1-27. https://doi.org/10.1080/17546559.2025.2589278
- Wacks, David A. "Reconquest Colonialism and Andalusī Narrative Practice in the Conde Lucanor." diacritics 36, no. 3-4 (2006): 87-103.
