= Fernando de la Cerda (1275–1322) =

Ferdinand de la Cerda
- Lord consort of Lara
- Arms of the House of La Cerda before 1376
- Born: 1275
- Died: Shortly after 1 June 1322
- Noble family: House de la Cerda
- Spouse: Juana Núñez de Lara
- Issue: Juan Núñez III de Lara; Blanche Núñez de Lara; Margaret Núñez de Lara; María Núñez de Lara
- Father: Ferdinand de la Cerda, Infante of Castile
- Mother: Blanche of France

Fernando de la Cerda (1275–1322) was the younger son of Ferdinand de la Cerda, Infante of Castile and his wife Blanche of France. His paternal grandparents were Alfonso X of Castile and Violant of Aragon. His maternal grandparents were Louis IX of France and Marguerite of Provence. His elder brother was Alfonso de la Cerda.

== The fight for the throne ==
Fernando's father died before inheriting Castile. His elder brother, Alfonso, should have ascended the throne on his grandfather's death. In 1282 their uncle, Sancho assembled a coalition of nobles to declare for him against Fernando's elder brother, then took control of the kingdom when Alfonso X of Castile died in 1284. This was all against the wishes of the boys' grandfather, but Sancho was crowned in Toledo nevertheless.

Sancho was recognised and supported by the majority of the nobility and the cities, but a sizable minority opposed him throughout his reign and worked for Alfonso and Fernando. One of the leaders of the opposition was Don Juan, his uncle, who united to his cause the lord of Vizcaya, Lope Díaz III de Haro. Sancho responded by executing the lord of Vizcaya and incarcerating his uncle.

== Marriage and issue ==
Fernando was married to Juana Núñez de Lara, who is also known as Lady of Lara. The couple had three daughters and a son,

- Juan Núñez de Lara (1313–1350), married María Díaz II de Haro.
- Blanche Núñez de Lara (1311–1347), married Juan Manuel, Prince of Villena and was mother of Juana Manuel of Castile, consort of Henry II of Castile and mother of John I of Castile.
- Margaret Núñez de Lara, a nun.
- María Núñez de Lara, married Charles II of Alençon and was mother of Charles III of Alençon.
