= Fernando de la Cerda (1255–1275) =

Heir apparent to the Crown of Castile (1255–1275)

Ferdinand de la Cerda
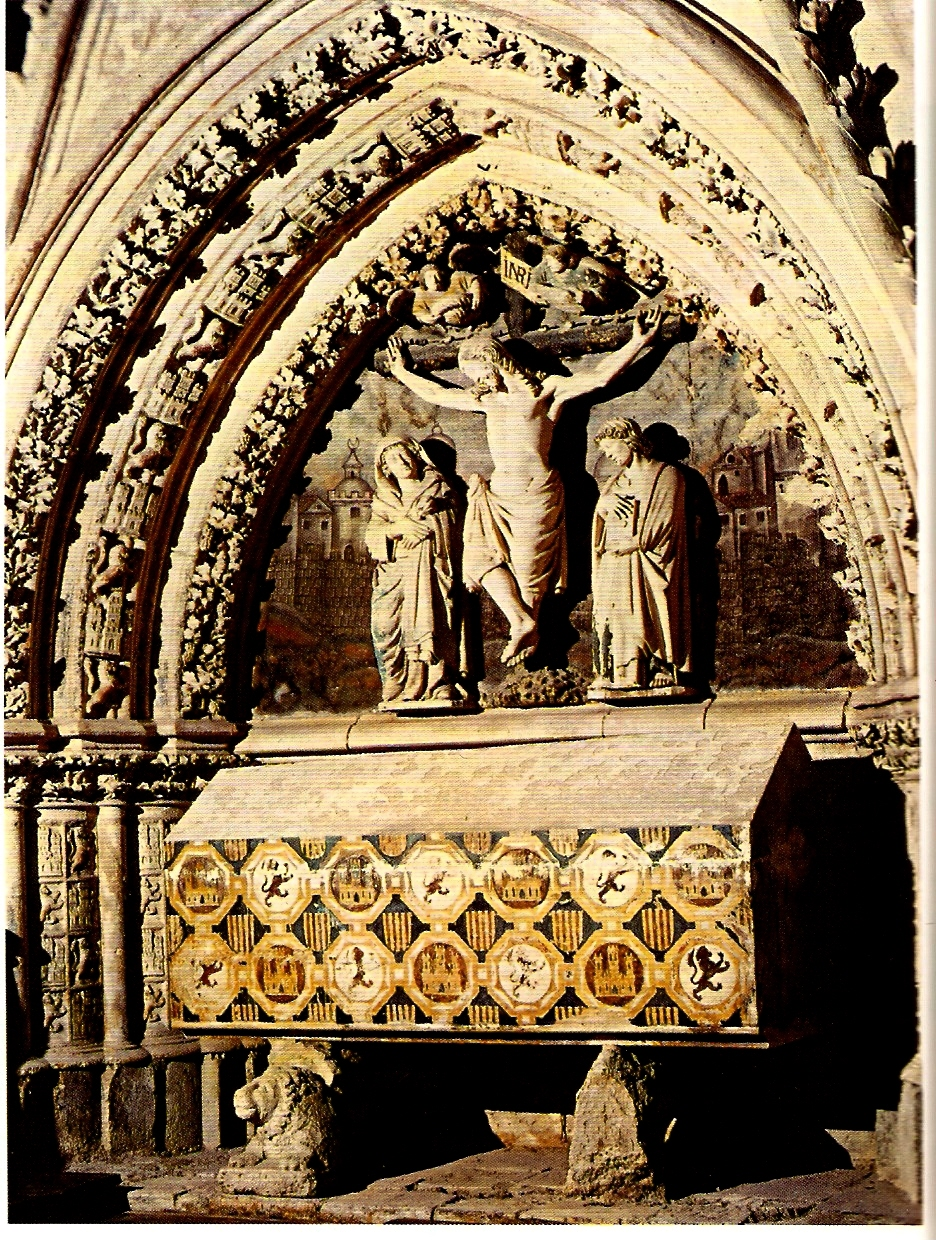
- Tomb of Ferdinand de la Cerda
- Born: 23 October 1255; Valladolid, Castile
- Died: 25 June 1275 (aged 19); Ciudad Real, Castile
- Noble family: House of la Cerda
- Spouse: Blanche of France
- Issue: Alfonso de la Cerda; Fernando de la Cerda
- Father: Alfonso X of Castile
- Mother: Violant of Aragon

Ferdinand de la Cerda (23 October 1255 – 25 June 1275) was the heir apparent to the Crown of Castile as the eldest son of Alfonso X and Violant of Aragon. His nickname, de la Cerda, means "of the bristle" in Spanish. There are various accounts of the origin of this name, including that it was a reference to being born with a full head of hair or that he was born with a hairy mole, resembling a bristle or mane, on his chest or back according to different accounts.

Arms of the House de la Cerda to the 13th century, a combination of Castile and León, from infante Fernando, and the arms of France, for Blanche of France.

In November 1268 Ferdinand married Blanche, the daughter of King Louis IX of France. They had two sons:

- Alfonso de la Cerda (1270-1333), who was believed to have married Matilde of Narbonne, daughter of Viscount Aimery VI of Narbonne. Recent research showed that Alfonso de la Cerda married Matilde of Brienne, daughter of John I of Brienne. They had four sons and three daughters.
- Fernando de la Cerda (1275-1322), who married Juana Núñez de Lara, called "la Palomilla", Lady of Lara & Herrera, daughter of Juan Núñez de Lara “el Mayor” and Teresa Álvarez de Azagra. They had one son and three daughters. One daughter, Blanca Núñez de Lara, was the mother-in-law to King Henry II of Castile.

Ferdinand became regent of Castile in November 1274 when his father left for Germany. In May 1275 the Marinids from Morocco landed in Spain upon call from Muhammad II of Granada and attacked Castile. Ferdinand raised troops and moved south from Burgos to defend the kingdom but died unexpectedly in Villa Real on 25 June 1275 leaving Castile open to invasion. His sons did not inherit the throne of their grandfather, since their uncle Sancho, who had repulsed the Moorish invasion, usurped the throne.

== Sources ==
- Linehan, Peter (2008). Spain, 1157-1300: A Partible Inheritance. Wiley.
