= Chronology of the Reconquista =

Reconquista
- Part of the Crusades
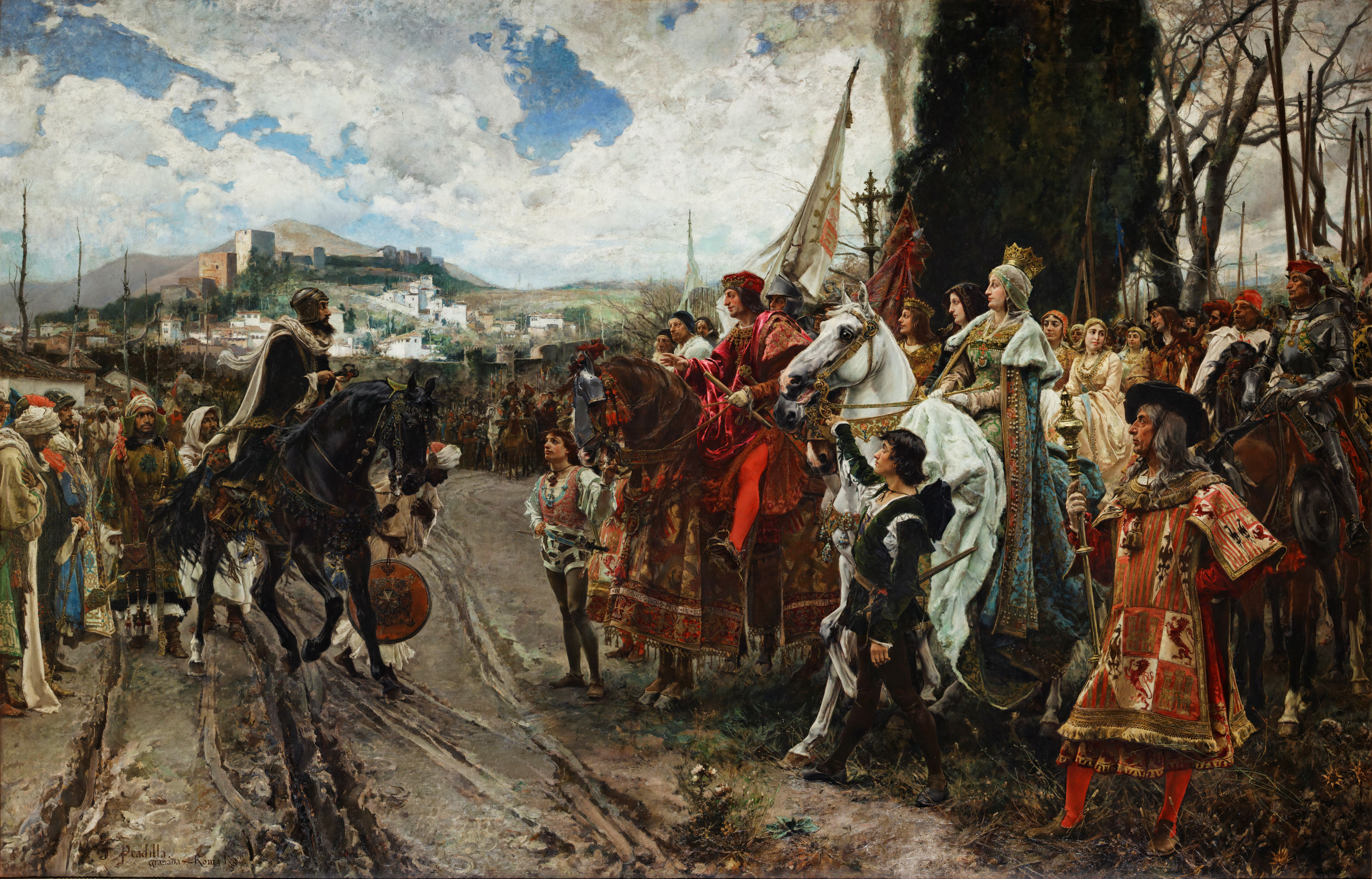
- La rendición de Granada by Francisco Pradilla Ortiz. Muhammad XI surrenders to Ferdinand and Isabella.
Date	711–1492
Location	Iberia, Northern Africa
Result	Moors expelled from Western Europe
Territorial changes	Iberia reclaimed by Christians

Belligerents
Visigoths; Roderic; Egilona; Theudemia; Pelagius (Note: Pelagius (of Asturias) was a Visigoth nobleman who founded the Kingdom of Asturias in 718. He is credited with initiating the Reconquista.); France; Odo the Great; Lampegia; Charles Martel; Pepin the Short; Charlemagne; Asturias; Pelagius of Asturias (Note: Pelagius of Asturias was the first king of Asturias whose reign began in 714.); Favila of Asturias; Alfonso I the Catholic; Fruela I the Cruel; Aurelius of Asturias; Silo of Asturias; Mauregatus the Usurper; Bermudo I the Monk; Alfonso II the Chaste; Nepotian of Asturias; Ramiro I of Asturias; Ordoño I of Asturias; Alfonso III the Great (Note: The Kingdom of Asturias merged with the Kingdom of León in 925 and Alfonso III the Great was succeeded by Fruela II in Asturias, Alfonso III in León and, in Galicia, by Ordoño II of León.); Fruela II of Asturias; Alfonso Fróilaz (Note: Alfonso Fróilaz the Hunchback was briefly the king of the unified kingdom of Asturias, Galicia and León in 925. He succeeded his father Fruela II of Asturias. Later that year, Asturias would become part of León. Galicia would reunite with León later, in 929); Galicia; Ordoño II of León (Note: Ordoño II of León was king of Galicia from 910 and king of León from 914. In Galicia, he succeeded Alfonso III the Great.); Sancho Ordóñez (Note: Sancho Ordóñez was succeeded by Fruela II of Asturias in Galicia.); Garcia II of Galicia (Note: Garcia II of Galicia succeeded his father Ferdinand I the Great as king of Galicia in 1065 and was overthrown by his brothers Sancho II the Strong and Alfonso VI the Brave in 1071.); Pamplona; Íñigo Arista (Note: Íñigo Arista was the first king of Pamplona beginning in 824.); García Íñiguez; Fortún Garcés; Sancho I of Pamplona; Jimeno Garcés; García Sánchez I (Note: García Sánchez I was also the first King of Najera.); Sancho II of Pamplona; García Sánchez II; Sancho III the Great; García Sánchez III; Sancho Garcés IV (Note: Sancho Garcés IV was succeeded by Sancho Ramirez V, the king of Aragon.); Navarre; García Ramírez (Note: García Ramírez of Navarre, known as "the Restorer," succeeded Alfonso I the Battler as king of Navarre.); Sancho VI the Wise; Sancho VII the Strong; Theobald I the Troubadour; Theobald II of Navarre; Henry I the Fat; Joan I of Navarre (Note: Joan I of Navarre married Philip IV of France and Kingdom of Navarre came under French control.); Aragon; Ramiro I of Aragon (Note: Ramiro I of Aragon was the first king of Aragon beginning in 1035.); Sancho Ramirez V (Note: Sancho Ramirez V and Peter I of Aragon were also successive kings of Pamplona, succeeding Sancho Garcés IV of Pamplona.); Peter I of Aragon; Alfonso I the Battler (Note: Alfonso I the Battler was also the first king of Navarre (formerly known as Pamplona), succeeding Peter I of Aragon and Pamplona. He was succeeded in Navarre by García Ramírez of Navarre.); Ramiro II the Monk; Petronilla of Aragon; Alfonso II the Troubadour; Peter II the Catholic; James I the Conqueror; Peter III of Aragon; Alfonso III the Liberal; James II the Just; Alfonso IV the Kind; Peter IV the Ceremonious; John I the Hunter; Martin the Humane; Ferdinand I of Aragon; Alfonso V el Magnànim; John II the Great; Ferdinand II of Aragon (Note: Ferdinand II of Aragon married Isabella I of Castile and became Ferdinand V of Castile and León in 1475.); León; Alfonso IV the Monk (Note: Alfonso IV the Monk succeeded Fruela II of Asturias as king of León after a brief interlude by Alfonso Fróilaz.); Ramiro II of León; Ordoño III of León; Sancho I the Fat; Ordoño IV the Wicked; Ramiro III of León; Bermudo II the Gouty; Alfonso V the Noble; Bermudo III of León; Ferdinand I the Great (Note: Ferdinand I the Great was succeeded by Alfonso VI the Brave as king of León and Garcia II of Galicia as king of Galicia.); Ferdinand II of León (Note: Ferdinand II of León succeeded Alfonso VII the Emperor as king of León.); Alfonso IX of León; Sancha of León; Dulce of León (Note: Sancha of León and her sister Dulce of León were the daughters of Alfonso IX of León who were succeeded by Ferdinand III of Castile after the union of Castile and León.); Castile; Sancho II the Strong (Note: Sancho II of Castile and León, nicknamed "the Strong," was the first king of Castile, beginning in 1065.); Alfonso VI the Brave (Note: Alfonso VI the Brave was king of León from 1065–1109, serving jointly with his brother Sancho II the Strong briefly in 1072.); Urraca of Castile (Note: Urraca of Castile was queen of León from 1109–1126.); Alfonso VII the Emperor (Note: Alfonso VII the Emperor was king of León from 1135–1157 and was succeeded there by his son Ferdinand II of León.); Sancho III the Desired; Alfonso VIII the Noble; Henry I of Castile; Berengaria the Great; Ferdinand III the Saint (Note: The Treaty of Benavente was signed on 11 December 1230, in which Sancha and Dulce, the heiresses of the Kingdom of León, renounced their throne to their brother, Ferdinand III of Castile, unifying the two kingdoms.); Alfonso X the Wise; Sancho IV the Brave; Ferdinand IV of Castile; Alfonso XI the Avenger; Peter the Cruel; Constance of Castile (Note: Constance of Castile, daughter of Peter the Cruel, claimed the throne during the Castilian succession crisis.); John of Gaunt (Note: John of Gaunt claimed the throne of Castile by virtue of his marriage to Constance of Castile.); Henry of Trastámara (Note: Henry of Trastámara, known as Henry II the Fratricidal, killed his half-brother Peter the Cruel, ending the Castilian Civil War.); John I of Castile; Henry III the Suffering; John II of Castile; Henry IV the Impotent; Isabella I of Castile (Note: Isabella I is known as Isabella the Catholic. She and her husband Ferdinand V of Castile ruled over a unified Spain as the Catholic Monarchs.); Ferdinand V(II) of Castile (Note: Ferdinand II of Aragon married Isabella I of Castile in 1469 and became king of Castile and León as Ferdinand V of Castile shortly after the death of Isabella's brother Henry IV of Castile.)	Umayyad Caliphate al-Walid I (Note: Al-Walid I ibn Abd al-Malik was the sixth Umayyad caliph beginning in 668.); Sulayman ibn Abd al-Malik; Umar ibn Abd al-Aziz; Marwan II (Note: Marwan ibn Muhammad ibn Marwan was the last caliph of the Umayyads. The Abbasid Caliphate took power on 25 January 750.); Al-Andalus; Musa ibn Nusayr (Note: Musa ibn Nusayr was the first governor of al-Andalus beginning in 712.); Abd al-Aziz ibn Musa; Al-Samh ibn al-Khawlani; Anbasa ibn Suhaym; Abd al-Malik ibn al-Fihri; Uqba ibn al-Hajjaj; Yusuf ibn al-Fihri (Note: The governor of al-Andalus, Yusuf ibn al-Fihri, was succeeded by Abd al-Rahman I as the first emir of Córdoba.); Emirate of Córdoba; Abd al-Rahman I (Note: Abd al-Rahman I was the first emir of Córdoba, beginning in 756.); Hisham I of Córdoba; Al-Hakam I Abd al-Rahman II; Muhammad I Al-Mundhir of Córdoba; Abdullah of Córdoba (Note: Abdullah of Córdoba was succeeded as emir of Córdoba by his grandson Abd al-Rahman III one day after his death on 15 October 912. On 16 January 929, Abd al-Rahman III would declare himself caliph.); Caliphate of Córdoba; Abd al-Rahman III (Note: Abd al-Rahman III was the first caliph of Córdoba, beginning in 929.); Al-Hakam II; Hisham II of Córdoba; Muhammad II al-Mahdi; Sulayman ibn al-Hakam; Ali ibn Hammud al-Nasir; Al-Qasim al-Ma'mun; Almanzor (Note: As the chancellor of the Caliphate of Córdoba and hajib for Hisham II, Almanzor was effectively ruler of Islamic Iberia.); Abd al-Malik al-Muzaffar; Hisham III of Córdoba (Note: After the caliphate fell with the overthrow of Hisham III in 1031, its land holdings devolved into a number of taifas.); Almoravids; Yusuf ibn Tashfin (Note: Yusuf ibn Tashfin was emir of the Almoravids from 1061, succeeding the Sanhaja Berber tribal leader Abu Bakr ibn Umar who followed the spiritual authority of Abdallah ibn Yasin.); Ali ibn Yusuf; Tashfin ibn Ali; Ibrahim ibn Tashfin; Ishaq ibn Ali (Note: Ishaq ibn Ali served briefly in 1147 and was killed after the conquest of Marrakesh by the Almohads.); Almohads; Ibn Tumart; Abd al-Mu'min (Note: Abd al-Mu'min became the first Almohad caliph in 1130, a caliphate based on the teachings of Ibn Tumart.); Abū Ya'qūb Yūsuf I Yaqub al-Mansur; Muhammad al-Nasir; Abū Ya'qūb Yūsuf II; Abd al-Wahid I Abdallah al-Adil; Yahya al-Mu'tasim; Idris al-Ma'mun; Abd al-Wahid II; Abu al-Hasan as-Said; Abu Hafs Umar al-Murtada; Idris al-Wathiq (Note: Idris al-Wathiq was executed in 1269 when forces of the Marinids overran Marrakesh.); Marinids; Abd al-Haqq I (Note: Abd al-Haqq I became the first leader of the Marinids in 1215. The Marinid Sultanate would be founded in 1269 by Abu Yusuf Yaqub.); Uthman I ibn Abd al-Haqq; Muhammad I Abu Yahya; Abu Yusuf Yaqub; Abu Yaqub Yusuf an-Nasr; Abu Thabit 'Amir; Abu al-Rabi Sulayman; Abu Sa'id Uthman II; Abu al-Hasan Ali; Abu Inan Faris; Muhammad II; Abu Faris Abd al-Aziz I Muhammad III; Al-Mustansir; Musa ibn al-Mutawakkil; Abd al-Aziz II ibn Ahmad II; Abdallah ibn Ahmad II; Abu Said Uthman III; Abd al-Haqq II (Note: In 1465, the last Marinid sultan Abd al-Haqq II was killed by a revolt in Fez, which led to the establishment of direct Wattasid rule over Morocco.); Emirate of Granada; Muhammad I (Note: The Nasrid dynasty began ruling the Emirate of Granada in 1232 under Muhammad I of Granada, the first sultan of Granada.); Muhammad II; Muhammad III; Nasr of Granada; Ismail I of Granada; Muhammad IV; Yusuf I of Granada; Muhammad V Ismail II of Granada; Muhammad VI; Muhammad VII; Muhammad VIII; Muhammad IX; Yusuf IV of Granada; Yusuf V of Granada; Muhammad X Abu Nasr Sa'd; Abu'l-Hasan Ali; Muhammad XI; Muhammad XII ______________________; Portugal; Henry of Portugal; Theresa of Portugal; Afonso I the Founder (Note: Afonso Henriques was the first king of Portugal as Afonso I of Portugal beginning in 1139.); Sancho I the Populator; Afonso II the Fat; Sancho II the Pious; Afonso III the Boulonnais; Denis the Poet King; Afonso IV the Brave; Peter I the Just; Ferdinand I the Handsome; Beatrice of Portugal; John I of Aviz; Edward the Eloquent; Alfonso V the African; John II the Perfect Prince

Commanders and leaders
Christians; Ermesinda; Adosinda; William of Gellone; Bera of Barcelona; Velasco the Basque; Aznar Sánchez; García Íñiguez; Rodrigo of Castile; Gomelo II; Ramiro Garcés; García Fernández; Sancho Garcés II; Sancho García; García Gómez; Ermengol I of Urgell; Hugh I of Empúries; R. Borrell of Barcelona; Berenguer Ramón II; El Cid; Jimena Díaz; Ermengol IV of Urgell; Álvar Fáñez; Odo I of Burgundy; William the Carpenter; Gaston IV of Béarn; Rotrou III of Perche; Centule II of Bigorre; William IX of Aquitaine; Bernard Ato IV; William V of Montpellier; Sigurd the Crusader; Sancho Alfónsez; Martín Flaínez; Fernando Díaz; Diego Gelmírez; Gómez González; Pedro González de Lara; William X of Aquitaine; Rodrigo González de Lara; Ramon Berenguer III; Pedro Ansúrez; Guy of Lescar; Aimery II of Narbonne; Centule VI of Béarn; Bertrán de Risnel; Rodrigo Martínez; Muño Alfonso; Hervey de Glanvill; Arnout IV of Aarschot; Ramon Berenguer IV; Ramón de Bonifaz; Gerald the Fearless (Note: Gerald the Fearless is known as the Portuguese El Cid.); Gualdim Pais; Diego López II de Haro; P. Fernández de Castro; Peire de Montagut; Soeiro II of Lisbon; William I of Holland; William II of Béarn; Berenguer de Palou II; Nuño Sánchez; Peter I of Urgell; García F. de Villamayor; Goswin of Bossut; Alfonso de Molina; Álvaro Pérez de Castro; Bernat Guillem d'Entença; Pelayo Pérez Correa; Ramón de Bonifaz; Paio Peres Correia; Nuño González de Lara; Manuel of Castile; Fernando S. de Castro; Pedro Fernández de Híjar; Fernando de la Cerda; Sancho II de Aragon	Moors; Musa ibn Nusayr; Tariq ibn Ziyad; Ibn al-Ghafiqi; Umar I of Crete; Musa ibn al-Qasawi; Muhammad ibn Lubb; Galib ibn Abd al-Rahman; Wadih al-Siqlabi; Mujahid al-Amiri; Al-Mundhir; Ahmad al-Muqtadir; Abdallah ibn Buluggin; Yusuf al-Mu'taman; Yahya al-Qadir; Syr ibn Abi Bakr; Mazdali ibn Tilankan; Axataf; Ibn Mardanīš; Ibrahim ibn Hamusk; Yahya al-Mu'tasim; Abu Yahya; Ibn Hud (Note: By 1228, Ibn Hud had seized power over much of al-Andalus. His defeat at the Battle of Jerez in 1231 led to the rise of Muhammad I of Granada.); Zayd Abu Zayd; Zayyan ibn Mardanish (Note: In 1229, Zayyan ibn Mardanish became ruler of the Taifa of Valencia after dethroning Zayd Abu Zayd, the last Almohad governor of the province.); Abu Said Uthman I Abu Zayyan I Uthman ibn Abi al-Ula; Abu Malik Abd al-Wahid; Abu Tashufin I Kaid Ridavan ______________________; Christians (continued); Peter of Castile; Alfonso Fernández el Niño; Gonzalo Ruiz Girón; Roger of Lauria; Guzmán el Bueno; Ruy Pérez Ponce de León; Juan Núñez II de Lara; Alonso Pérez de Guzmán; Fernando Gutiérrez Tello; Garci López de Padilla; John of Castile; P. Fernández de Castro; James Douglas; James III of Majorca (Note: James III of Majorca was king of Majorca until 1344 when he was deposed by Peter IV of Aragon and Majorca annexed.); Juan Manuel of Villena; Garci Lasso de la Vega II; Edward the Black Prince (Note: Edward the Black Prince, heir to the throne of England, supported Peter the Cruel in the Castilian Civil War.); Bertrand du Guesclin (Note: Bertrand du Guesclin, later Constable of France, supported Henry of Trastámara in the Castilian Civil War and enabled the execution of Peter the Cruel by his half-brother Henry.); Diego García de Padilla; Enrique Enríquez el Mozo; J. Fernández de Heredia; João Afonso Telo; F. Sánchez de Tovar; Nuno Álvares Pereira; Pedro Álvares Pereira; Louis II de Bourbon; Pedro de Menezes; Álvaro de Luna; Henry of Aragon; Henry the Navigator; Philip the Good; Philip of Viana; Filippo Visconti; Biagio Assereto; Enrique Pérez de Guzmán; Ferdinand the Saint; Afonso of Braganza; Ferdinand of Viseu; Peter of Coimbra; John of Portugal; Juan Alonso de Guzmán; Alfonso of Asturias; Alonso de Arcos; Rodrigo de Arcos

This chronology presents the timeline of the Reconquista, a series of military and political actions taken following the Muslim conquest of the Iberian Peninsula that began in 711. These Crusades began a decade later with dated to the Battle of Covadonga and its culmination came in 1492 with the Fall of Granada to Isabella I of Castile and Ferdinand II of Aragon. The evolution of the various Iberian kingdoms (including Aragon, León and Castile) to the unified kingdoms of Spain and Portugal was key to the conquest of al-Andalus from the Moors.

== Chronologies of the Reconquista ==
Numerous chronologies of the Crusades have been published and include the following.

- A Chronology of the Crusades, covering the crusades from 1055 to 1456, by Timothy Venning.
- Chronology and Maps, covering 1095–1789, in The Oxford History of the Crusades, edited by Jonathan Riley-Smith.
- A Chronological Outline of the Crusades: Background, Military Expeditions, and Crusader States, covering 160–1798, in The Routledge Companion to the Crusades, by Peter Lock.
- A Narrative Outline of the Crusades, covering 1096–1488, ibid.
- The Crusades: A Chronology, covering 1096–1444, in The Crusades—An Encyclopedia, edited by Alan V. Murray.
- Important Dates and Events, 1049–1571, in History of the Crusades, Volume III, edited by Kenneth M. Setton (1975).
- Historical Dictionary of the Crusades, by Corliss K. Slack. Chronology from 1009 to 1330.
- Oxford Reference Timelines: Crusades, 1095–1303; Spain.

== 8th century ==
705

- 9 October 705. Al-Walid I becomes Umayyad caliph, leader of the Moors.

After 707

- (Date unknown). Arab general Musa ibn Nusayr leads the Moors in capturing Western Maghreb, then under Visigoth control.
- (Date unknown). Musa ibn Nusayr becomes governor of Ifriqiya, with Tariq ibn Ziyad as his deputy at Tangier.

=== 710 ===
- Estimated. Roderic becomes Visigothic king in Christian Hispania.

711

- 27–28 April. Tariq ibn Ziyad lands an invasion force of Arabs and Berbers at Gibraltar. This began the Muslim conquest of Spain.
- 19 July. The Visigoths are defeated at the Battle of Guadalete.
- Shortly thereafter. Roderic, the last Visigoth king, drowns while retreating.
- (Date unknown). Córdoba and Galicia are captured by the Moors.

712

- July. Musa ibn Nusayr lands in Iberia with a follow-on force, and Medina–Sidonia falls shortly afterwards.
- Fall. Seville falls to ibn Nusayr's forces.

713

- 5 April. Visigoth lord Theudemia of Murcia agrees to the Treaty of Orihuela with the Moors.
- 30 June. The city of Mértola surrenders to the Moors.

714

- Spring. Ibn Nusayr and Ibn Ziyad complete their conquest of Hispania, now known as al-Andalus.
- Summer. The caliph orders ibn Nusayr and ibn Ziyar to return to Damascus.
- (Date unknown). Abd al-Aziz ibn Musa given the governorship of al-Andalus.
- (Date unknown). Abd al-Aziz marries Egilona, widow of Roderic.

715

- February. Ibn Nusayr and ibn Ziyar return to Damascus to find the caliph dead, succeeded by his brother Sulayman ibn Abd al-Malik.
- (Date unknown). Musa ibn Nusayr is assassinated on the orders of Sulayman.

717

- (Date unknown). Córdoba is established as the capital of al-Andalus.

718

- Summer (year in question (Note: Some sources date the Battle of Covadonga to 722.)). Pelagius of Asturias defeats the Moors at the Battle of Covadonga, beginning the Reconquista.
- (Date unknown). Pelagius founds the Kingdom of Asturias.
- (Date unknown). The Moors conquer Barcelona.

Al-Andalus at its greatest extent

719

- (Date unknown). The forces of Umar ibn Abd al-Aziz led by al-Samh ibn Malik al-Khawlani capture the coastal city of Narbonne.
- (Date unknown). Al-Samh ibn Malik al-Khawlani becomes governor of al-Andalus.
- (Date unknown). Moorish occupation reaches its largest extent in Iberia and expands to Occitania.

=== 720 ===
- (Date unknown). The Moors under al-Samh conquer Narbonne.

721

- Early. The Moors establish garrisons in Septimania, beginning the Moorish invasion of Gaul. This included the County of Roussillon.
- 9 June. An army led by Odo the Great, the duke of Aquitaine, defeats the Moors at the Battle of Toulouse, stopping their progress westward from Narbonne into Aquitaine.

725

- (Date unknown). The Moors under Anbasa ibn Suḥaym al-Kalbi complete their conquest of Septimania.

=== 730 ===
- (Date unknown). After defeating the Saxons, Charles Martel turns his attention to the Moors, rivaling Odo the Great.
- (Date unknown). Odo the Great marries his daughter Lampegia to Berber rebel Munuza, securing a peace.

731

- (Date unknown). The Venerable Bede writes Ecclesiastical History of the English People.

732

- May. The Moors led by Abd al-Rahman ibn al-Ghafiqi capture Bordeaux after defeating Odo the Great at the Battle of the River Garonne.

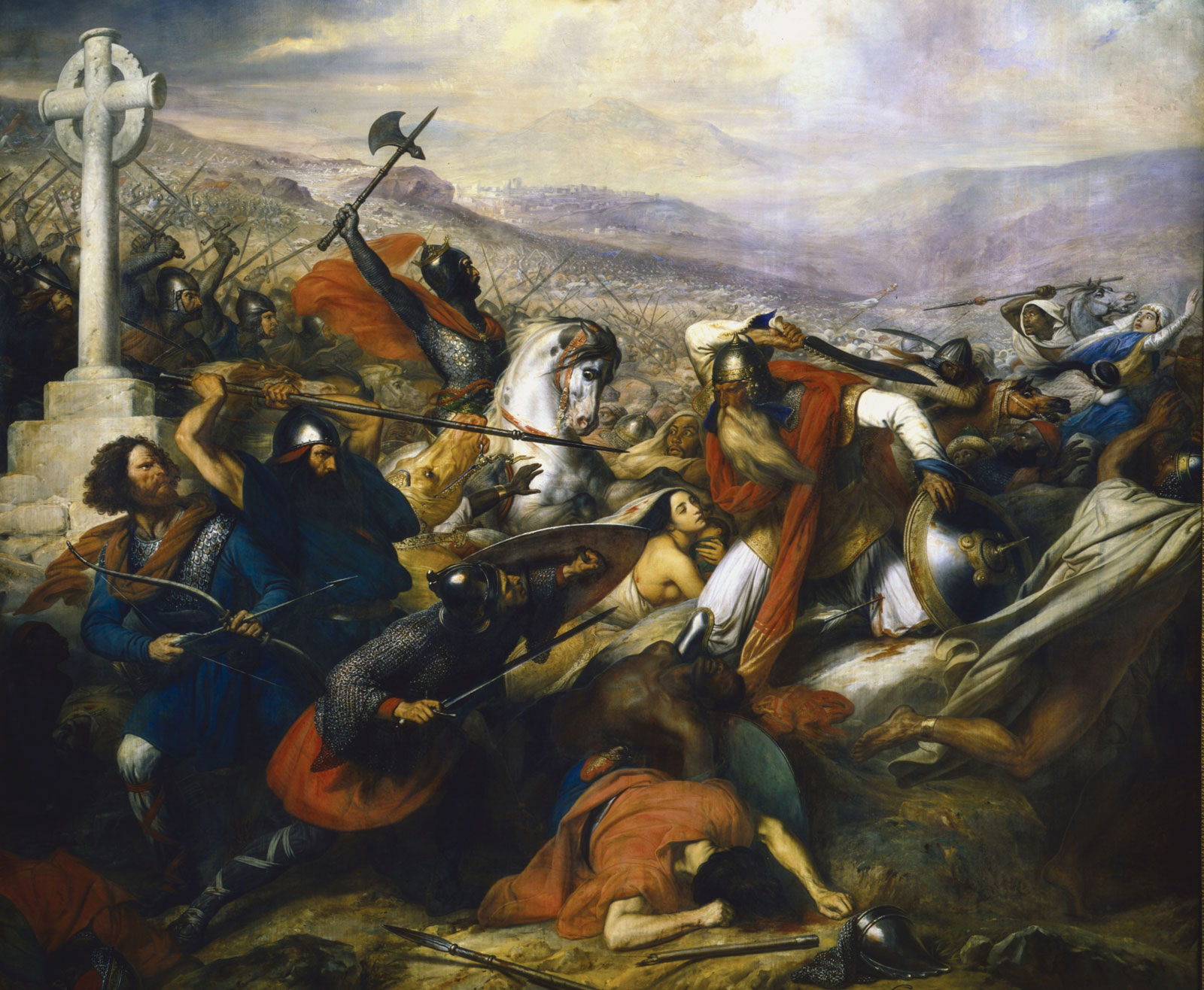
Bataille de Poitiers en Octobre 732 by Charles de Steuben depicts Charles Martel defeating Abd Al Rahman Al Ghafiqi at the Battle of Tours.

- 10 October. Charles Martel defeats the Moorish forces led by Abd al-Rahman at the Battle of Tours.

735

- (Date unknown). Uqba ibn al-Hajjaj invades Gaul and is stopped by Charles Martel.

737

- (Date unknown). Favila of Asturias succeeds his father Pelagius as the second king of Asturias.
- (Dates unknown). Charles Martel begins a campaign in Septimania which includes the following four sieges/battles:
1. Martel destroys a Moorish garrison at the Siege of Avignon.
2. Following the destruction of Avignon, Martel fails in the first Siege of Narbonne.
3. After his failure at Narbonne, Martel defeats Yusuf ibn Abd al-Rahman al-Fihri at the Battle of the River Berre.
4. Martel continues his campaign with the successful Siege of Nîmes. He then returns to France.

739

- (Date unknown). Alfonso I of Asturias (the Catholic) becomes king and creates the buffer zone known as the Desert of the Duero. He married Ermesinda, daughter of Pelagius.

740

- Early. The Berber Revolt results in several independent states created in North Africa.
- (Date unknown). Alfonso I of Asturias leads the Reconquest of Galicia, reestablishing the Kingdom of Galicia.

=== 750 ===
- 25 January. The Umayyads are defeated at the Battle of the Zab, leading to the Abbasid Revolution.

752

- (Date unknown). Frankish forces under Pepin the Short begin the second Siege of Narbonne.

754

- (Date unknown). The Mozarabic Chronicle of 754 is written.

756

- 14–15 May. The Umayyads led by Abd ar-Rahman I are successful at the Battle of Alameda, establishing the Emirate of Córdoba.

757

- (Date unknown). Fruela I of Asturias (the Cruel), son of Alfonso I and Ermesinda, becomes king.

759

- (Date unknown). Pepin reclaims Narbonne from the Moors.

760

- Pepin begins his expedition to Septimania and Aquitaine and conquers the cities of Carcassonne and Toulouse, and the County of Roussillon.

761

- 25 November. The city of Oviedo founded.

768

- (Date unknown). Aurelius of Asturias becomes king succeeding his cousin Fruela I the Cruel.

774

- (Date unknown). Silo of Asturias becomes king, coming to the throne upon his marriage to Adosinda, daughter of Alfonso I.

=== 777 ===
- (Date unknown). Charlemagne and caliph Harun al-Rashid pursue an Abbasid–Carolingian alliance.

778

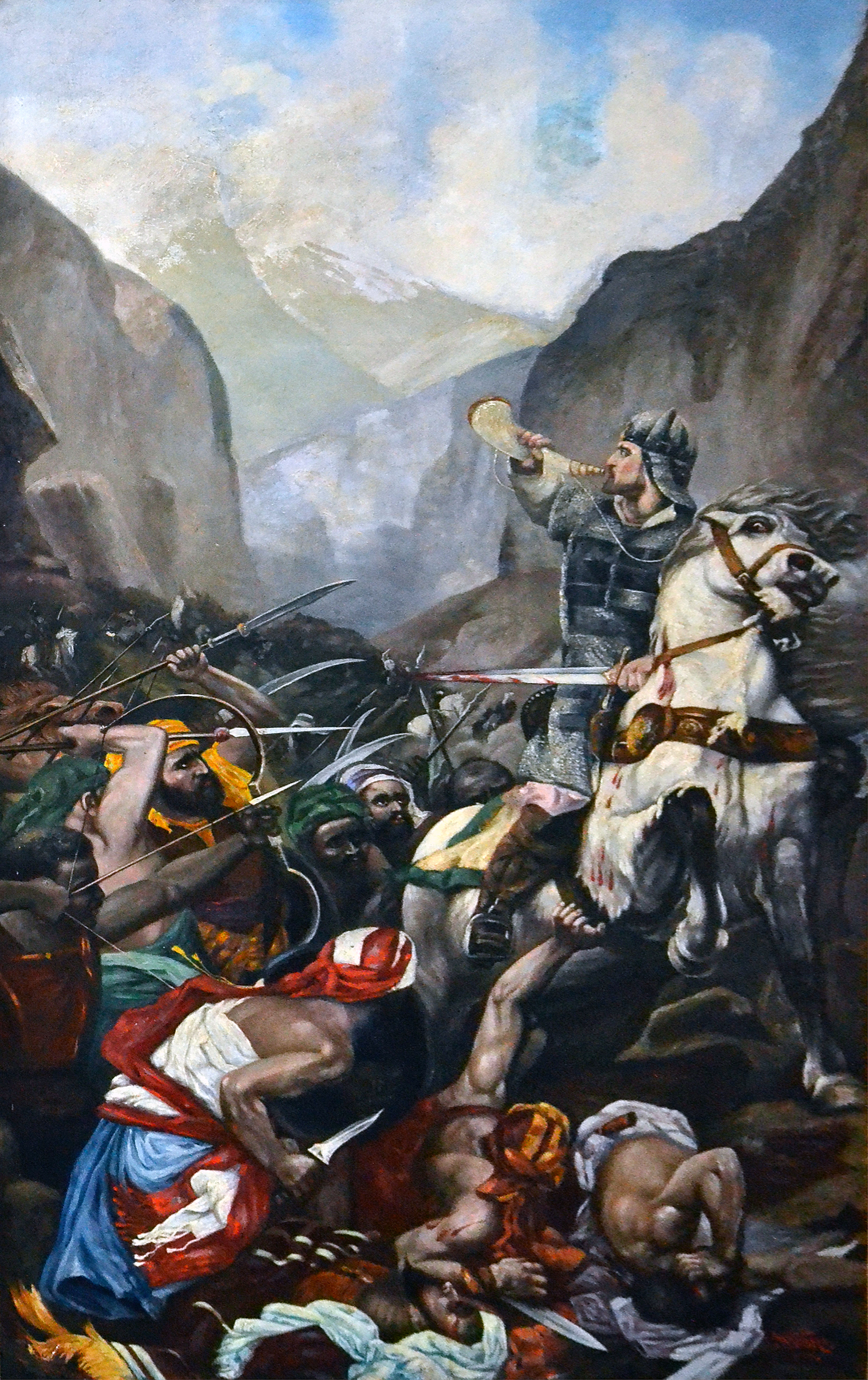
Roland at the Battle of Roncevaux Pass

- 15 August. A contingent of Basques ambush Carolingian forces at the first Battle of Roncevaux Pass. The 12th-century work The Song of Roland is based on this battle and the exploits of the legendary Frankish military leader Roland.

=== 781 ===
- (Date unknown). Louis the Pious named King of Aquitaine.

783

- (Date unknown). Mauregatus (the Usurper) becomes king of Asturias. He was an illegitimate son of Alfonso I.

787

- (Date unknown). Paul the Deacon writes the History of the Lombards.

789

- (Date unknown). Bermudo I of Asturias (the Monk) becomes king.

=== 791 ===
- 1 January. The Moorish forces of Córdoba defeat a Christian force led by Bermudo I the Monk at the Battle of Río Burbia.
- 14 September. Bermudo abdicates and is succeeded by his cousin Alfonso II of Asturias (the Chaste).

793

- 28 March. A Frankish force led by William of Gellone is defeated by the Moors at the Battle of Orbiel River.

794

- (Date unknown). Hisham I of Córdoba is defeated by Alfonso II of Asturias at the Battle of Lutos.

795

- 16 September. Hisham I defeats Asturias at the Battle of Las Babias.
- (Date unknown). Marca Hispanica is established by Charlemagne.

== 9th century ==
=== 800 ===
- 20 August. Frankish siege army mustered under Louis the Pious to attack Barcelona.
- October. Siege of Barcelona begins with forces led by William of Gellone.

801

Iberia in 814

- 4 April. The Siege of Barcelona ends with a Carolingian victory over the Moors. William of Gellone's son Bera becomes the first Count of Barcelona.

808

- (Date unknown). The Catalonian city of Tortosa is retained by the Moors after a year-long Siege of Tortosa.

816

- (Date unknown). A Frankish force led by Velasco the Basque is defeated by a Moorish force in the sixteen-day Battle of Pancorbo.

=== 824 ===
- (Date unknown). A Carolingian force under Aznar Sánchez of Gascony is defeated by the Basques at the second Battle of Roncevaux Pass.
- (Date unknown). The Kingdom of Pamplona is founded under Íñigo Arista. Formed around the city of Pamplona, this would include the Kingdom of Najera in 923 and eventually become the Kingdom of Navarre in 1134.

827

- (Date uncertain). Emirate of Crete founded under the Andalusian Umar I of Crete.

829

- (Date unknown). Annales Regni Francorum is written.

=== 842 ===
- (Date unknown). Nepotian of Asturias is briefly king after the death of Alfonso II of Asturias.
- Later. Ramiro I of Asturias becomes king after defeating Nepotian at the Battle of the Bridge of Cornellana.

843

- (Date unknown). García Íñiguez (later king of Pamplona) joins with rebel Musa ibn Musa al-Qasawi in an attack against the Emirate of Córdoba. The rebellion was put down by Abd ar-Rahman II.

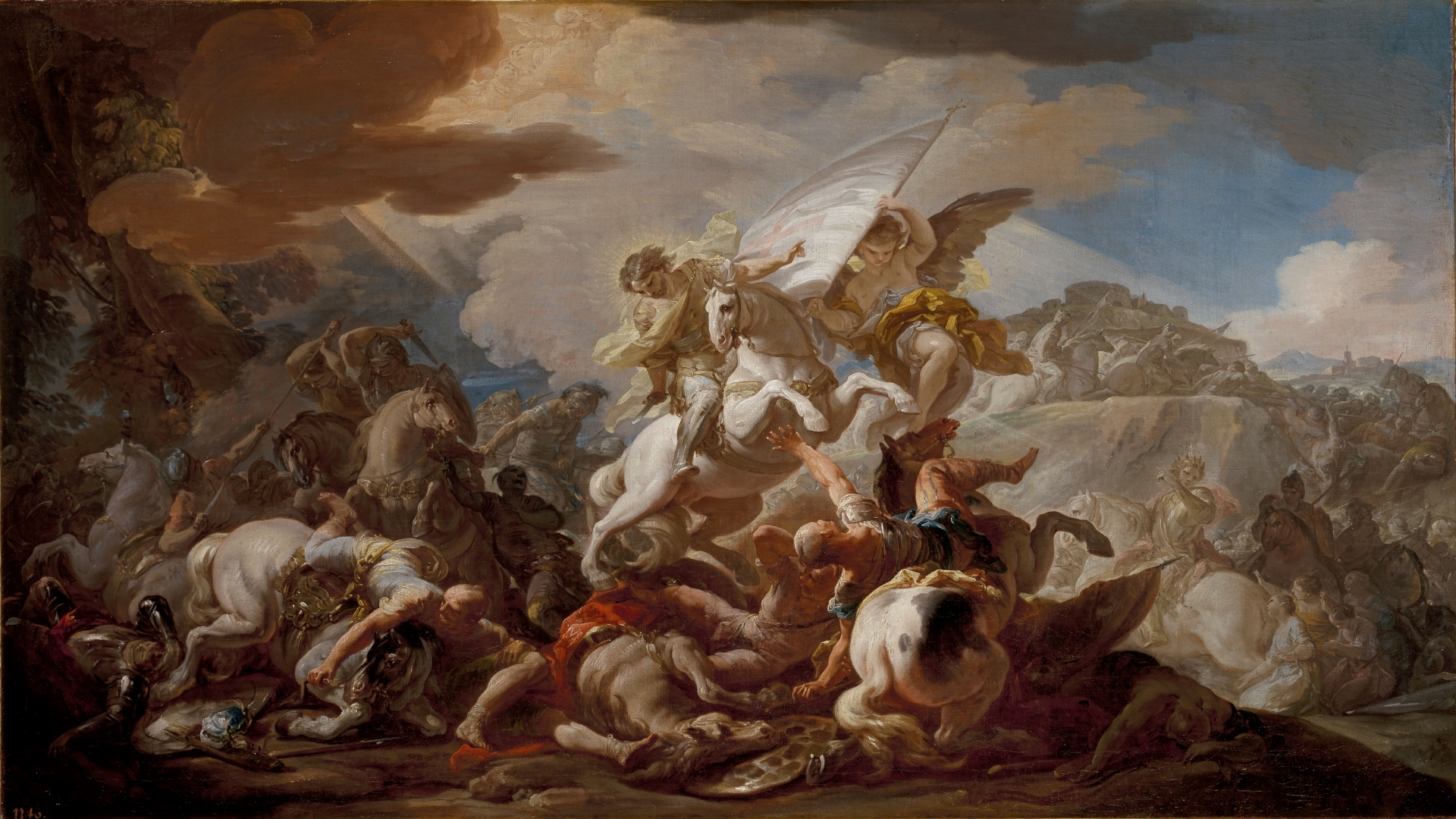
The Battle of Clavijo by Corrado Giaquinto.

844

- 23 May. The fictional Battle of Clavijo is presumed to have taken place.

=== 850 ===
- 1 February. Ordoño I of Asturias becomes king.
- (Date unknown (Note: The execution of the Martyrs of Córdoba may have occurred as late as 859)). The Martyrs of Córdoba are executed.

851

- (Date unknown). The Moors under Musa ibn Musa al-Qasawi defeat the Franks and Gascons at the Battle of Albelda.
- (Date unknown). Ordoño I of Asturias begins a campaign to suppress a Basque revolt.
- (Date unknown). García Íñiguez of Pamplona becomes king.

852

- (Date unknown). Forces under the command of Muhammad I of Córdoba defeat those of Asturias and Navarre at the Battle of Guadalacete.

859

- (Date uncertain). García Íñiguez is captured by a Viking force and ransomed.
- Later. Ordoño I and his ally García Íñiguez defeat the Moors under Musa ibn Musa al-Qasawi at the Battle of Monte Laturce.

=== 865 ===
- 9 August. Castilian nobleman Rodrigo of Castile defeats Muhammad I of Córdoba at the Battle of the Morcuera.

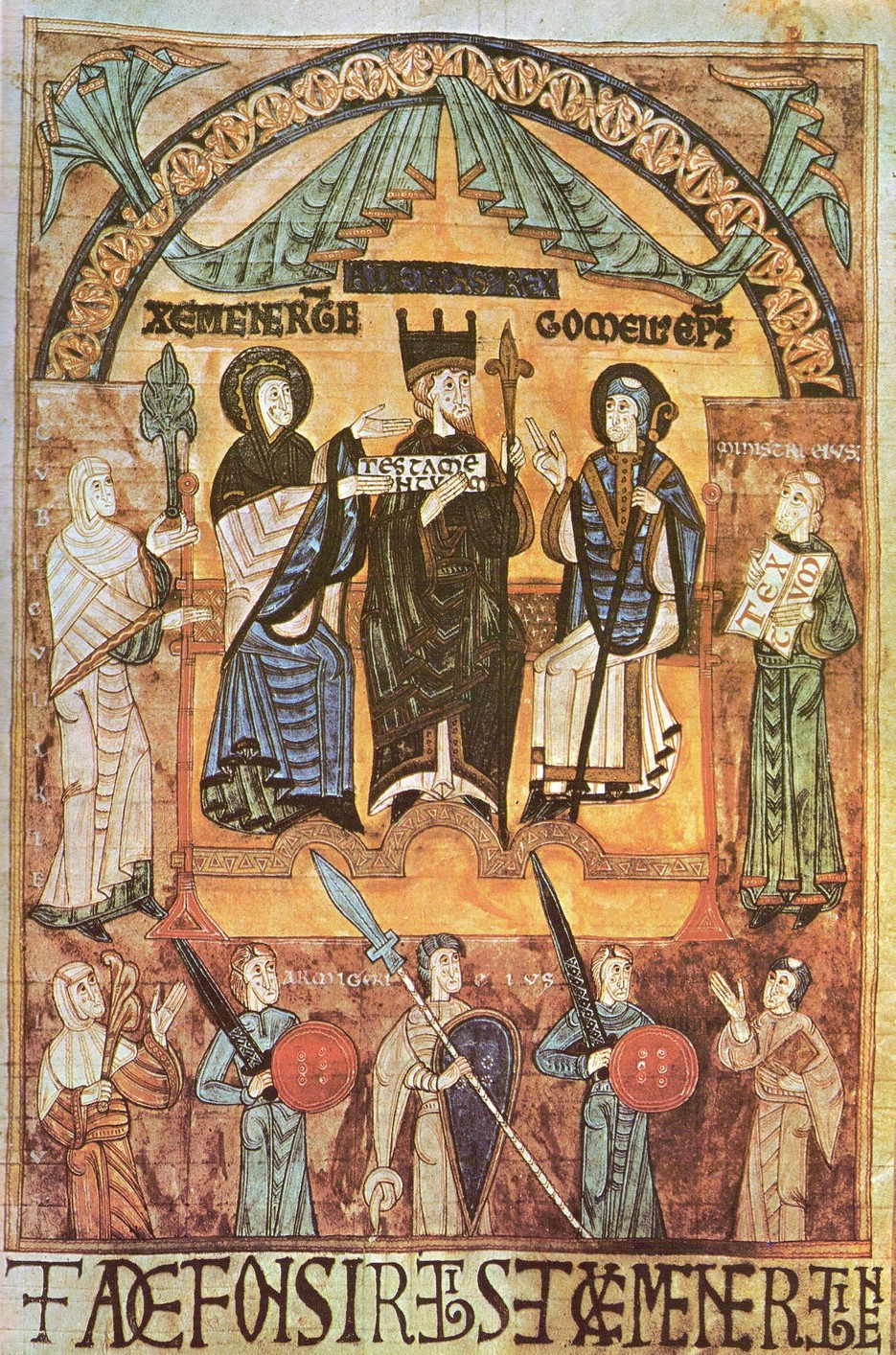
Miniature (c. 1118) from the archives of Oviedo Cathedral showing Alfonso III flanked by his wife Jimena and bishop Gomelo II.

866

- 27 May. Alfonso III of Asturias (the Great) becomes king of Asturias.

870

- (Date unknown). García Íñiguez forms an alliance with Moorish rebel Amrus ibn Yusuf.
- Later. (Note: The date of the beginning of the reign of Fortún Garcés of Pamplona varies between 870 and 882 in the sources.) Fortún Garcés of Pamplona becomes king.

=== 878 ===
- (Date unknown). Alfonso III of Asturias defeats Muhammad I of Córdoba at the Battle of Polvoraria.

881

- (Date unknown). Codex Vigilanus and Chronicle of Alfonso III are compiled.

882

- (Date unknown). Asturias defeats the Córdobans under Muhammad ibn Lubb and al-Mundhir of Córdoba at the First Battle of Cellorigo.

883

- April. The Latin chronicle Chronica Prophetica is written.
- (Date unknown). Asturias again defeats Córdoba at the Second Battle of Cellorigo.

== 10th century ==
=== 901 ===
- July. Alfonso III defeats the Moorish forces under Ibn al-Qitt at the battle known as the Day of Zamora.

905

- (Date unknown). Sancho I of Pamplona becomes king.

=== 910 ===
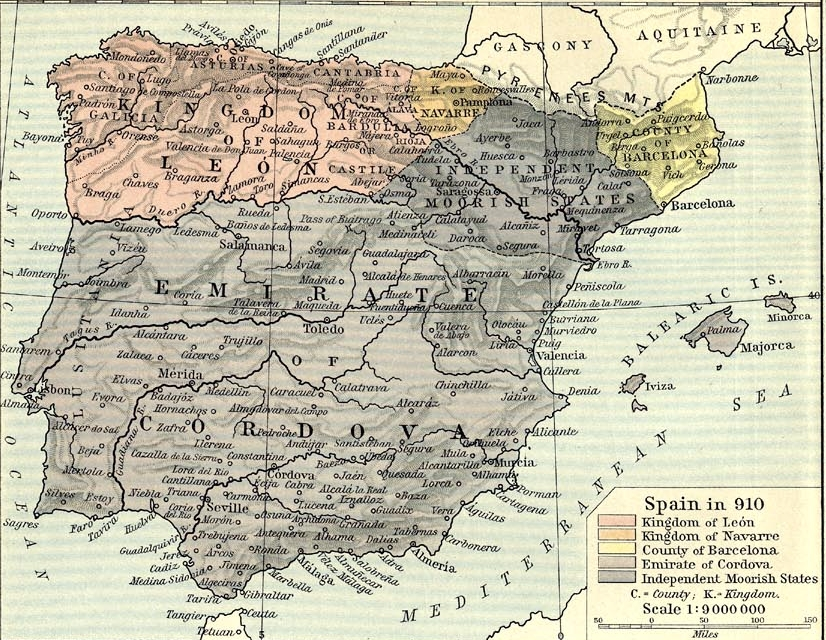
The Kingdom of León in 910

- (Date unknown). Kingdom of León founded under Garcia I of León.
- 20 December. Alfonso III dies and is succeeded by his sons Fruela II of Asturias, Ordoño II of León in Galicia, and García I of León in León.
- (After 910). The Chronicle of Alfonso III written.

912

- 16 October. Abd al-Rahman III becomes emir of Córdoba, one day after the death of his grandfather Abdullah of Córdoba.

917

- (Date unknown). Ordoño II of León defeats Córdoba at the Battle of San Esteban de Gormaz.

=== 920 ===
- 26 July. The Moorish forces of Córdoba defeat the forces of León and Navarre at the Battle of Valdejunquera.

923

- (Date unknown). Kingdom of Najera formed under García Sánchez I.

925

- August. Fruela II of Asturias dies, and his son Alfonso Fróilaz briefly becomes the king of the unified kingdom of Asturias, Galicia and León. He is soon deposed by his cousins Sancho Ordóñez, Alfonso IV of León and Ramiro II of León.
- Later. The Kingdom of León absorbs Asturias and operates as a united kingdom under Alfonso IV of León.
- 10 December. Jimeno Garcés becomes king of Pamplona upon the death of his brother Sancho I of Pamplona.

926

- (Date unknown). Sancho Ordóñez becomes king of Galicia. He may also had been briefly king of León from 925 to 926.

928

- (Not later than). García Sánchez I becomes joint ruler of Pamplona with his uncle Jimeno Garcés.

Emirate/Caliphate of Córdoba

929

- 16 January. Caliphate of Córdoba established under Abd ar-Rahman III.
- (Date unknown). The Kingdom of Galicia reunites with the Kingdom of León after the death of Sancho Ordóñez.

=== 930 ===
- May. The first Siege of Toledo begins.

931

- (Date unknown). Alfonso IV of León abdicates in favor of his brother Ramiro II of León.
- (Date unknown).The County of Castile splits from the Kingdom of León.

932

- June. The Córdobans defeat Ramiro II of León at the first Siege of Toledo, taking the city and holding it until 1085.

939

- 19 June. The forces of Ramiro II of León defeat those of Abd al-Rahman III at the Battle of Simancas.
- 5 August. Abd al-Rahman III defeats troops were those loyal to Ramiro II at the Battle of Alhandic.

=== 951 ===
- 1 January. Ordoño III of León becomes king.

956

- (Date unknown). Sancho I of León becomes king.

958

- (Date unknown). Ordoño IV of León becomes king, interrupting the reign of Sancho I of León for two years.

=== 961 ===
- 6 March. Crete recaptured by the Byzantines after the Siege of Chandax.
- 15 October. Al-Hakam II becomes Caliph of Córdoba after the death of Abd ar-Rahman III.

966

- 19 December. Ramiro III of León becomes king.

970

- 22 February. Sancho II of Pamplona becomes king.

975

- 6 July. Córdoba defeats the Kingdom of Viguera under Ramiro Garcés at the Battle of Estercuel.

976

- 16 October. Hisham II becomes Caliph of Córdoba.

The campaigns of Almanzor, 977–1006

978

- (Date unknown). Almanzor (Ibn Abi ‘Amir) becomes chamberlain of the Caliphate of Córdoba and continues his campaigns against the Christians.

=== 981 ===
- 9 July. Forces loyal to Córdoba under Almanzor and defeat a rebel force under Galib ibn Abd al-Rahman supported by Ramiro Garcés and García Fernández at the Battle of Torrevicente.
- (Date unknown). Christian forces of Ramiro III of León, García Fernández and Sancho Garcés II were defeated by Moorish forces led by Almanzor at the Battle of Rueda.

982

- (Date unknown). Bermudo II of León becomes king of Galicia (as Bermudo I).

984

- (Date unknown). Bermudo II becomes king of León and seeks an alliance with Almanzor.

985

- Summer. The Hispanic March is attacked by Almanzor who defeats Borrell II at the Battle of Rovirans.
- 1–6 July. Almanzor leads the Sack of Barcelona.

987

- (Date unknown). The Portuguese city of Coimbra is taken from the Christians by Almanzor.

=== 994 ===
- (Date unknown). García Sánchez II of Pamplona becomes king.

997

- (Date unknown). Santiago de Compostela sacked by Almanzor after the successful Santiago de Compostela campaign.
- (Late 10th century). Códice de Roda written.

999

- September. Alfonso V of León becomes king.

== 11th century ==
=== 1000 ===
- 29 July. Almanzor defeats Sancho García and García Gómez at the Battle of Cervera.

1002

- July. The legendary Battle of Calatañazor is said to occur, with Almanzor dying on 10 August.

1003

- Early. The Moors under Abd al-Malik, the son of Almanzor, are defeated an alliance of Catalan counts at the (presumed) Battle of Torà.
- 25 February. In a follow-on to Torà, the Battle of Albesa was inconclusive.

1004

- (Date approximate (Note: Sancho III of Pamplona was first reported as king in 1004 but his father García Sánchez II of Pamplona was last reported in 1000.)). Sancho III of Pamplona (Sancho the Great) becomes king.

1008

- 20 October. Abd al-Malik dies and is succeeded by his brother Abd al-Rahman Sanchuelo.

1009

- 15 February. Muhammad II al-Mahdi usurps the Caliphate, imprisoning Hisham II.
- 9 March. Abd al-Rahman Sanchuelo is assassinated, leading to the Fitna of al-Andalus.
- November. Muhammad II overthrown by Sulayman ibn al-Hakam.

Caliphate of Córdoba in 1000

=== 1010 ===
- Early. A Catalan–Andalusian alliance is formed to overthrow the Caliphate overlords led by Muhammad II and Wadih al-Siqlabi, together with Franks led by Ermengol I of Urgell, Hugh I of Empúries, and Ramon Borrell of Barcelona.
- 2 June. The rebels defeat the Caliphate at the Battle of Aqbat al-Bakr.
- 23 July. Hisham II restored as caliph.
- (Date unknown). Taifa of Valencia formed.

1012

- (Date unknown). Taifa of Dénia founded under the warlord Mujahid al-Amiri.

1013

- 19 April. Sulayman ibn al-Hakam again becomes Caliph.

1015

- (Date unknown). Mujahid al-Amiri of Dénia seizes control of the Balearic Islands.

1016

- (Date unknown). Ali ibn Hammud al-Nasir from the Hammudid dynasty becomes Caliph.

1018

- 22 March. Al-Qasim al-Ma'mun becomes Caliph of Córdoba.
- (Date unknown). The Taifa of Zaragoza is founded under al-Mundhir ibn Yahya al-Tujibi.

1026

- (Date unknown). Hisham III becomes the last Caliph of Córdoba.

=== 1028 ===
- 7 August. Bermudo III of León becomes king.

1031

- (Date unknown). The death of Hisham III marks the end of the Caliphate of Córdoba, crumbling into a number of independent taifas.
- Shortly thereafter. The Taifa of Córdoba is formed.

The Iberian Peninsula in 1030, during the reign of Sancho the Great

=== 1035 ===
- February. Kingdom of Aragon founded under Ramiro I of Aragon.
- 23 March. The army of Bermudo III of León defeats the Taifa of Seville at the Battle of Cesar.
- 18 October. Sancho the Great, king of Pamplona since 1004, dies and his eldest son García Sánchez III of Pamplona becomes king.

1037

- 4 September. Ferdinand I of León (Ferdinand the Great) becomes king after defeating Bermudo III at the Battle of Tamarón.
- (Date unknown). Kingdom of Castile founded under Sancho II of Castile and León (Sancho the Strong).

=== 1043 ===
- (Date unknown). Castilian hero El Cid is born Rodrigo Díaz de Vivar near Burgos.

1049

- (Date unknown). Ahmad al-Muqtadir becomes ruler of the Taifa of Zaragoza.

1054

- 1 September. Ferdinand I of León defeats his brother García Sánchez III at the Battle of Atapuerca. García Sánchez III dies in that battle and is succeeded by Sancho IV of Pamplona.

=== 1063 ===
- 8 May. Ahmad al-Muqtadir of Zaragoza teams with a Castilian force led by Sancho II and defeats Ramiro I of Aragon at the Battle of Graus. Some accounts say that El Cid supported Sancho.
- Shortly thereafter. Ramiro I dies in battle and is succeeded by his son Sancho Ramirez.

1064

- (Estimated). Alexander II sanctions the Crusade of Barbastro against the Taifa of Lérida.
- 9 July. Ferdinand I of León captures the Portuguese city of Coimbra from the Moors after the first Siege of Coimbra.
- August. A force led by William of Montreuil, Sancho Ramírez and William VIII of Aquitaine captures Barbastro from the Moors.

1065

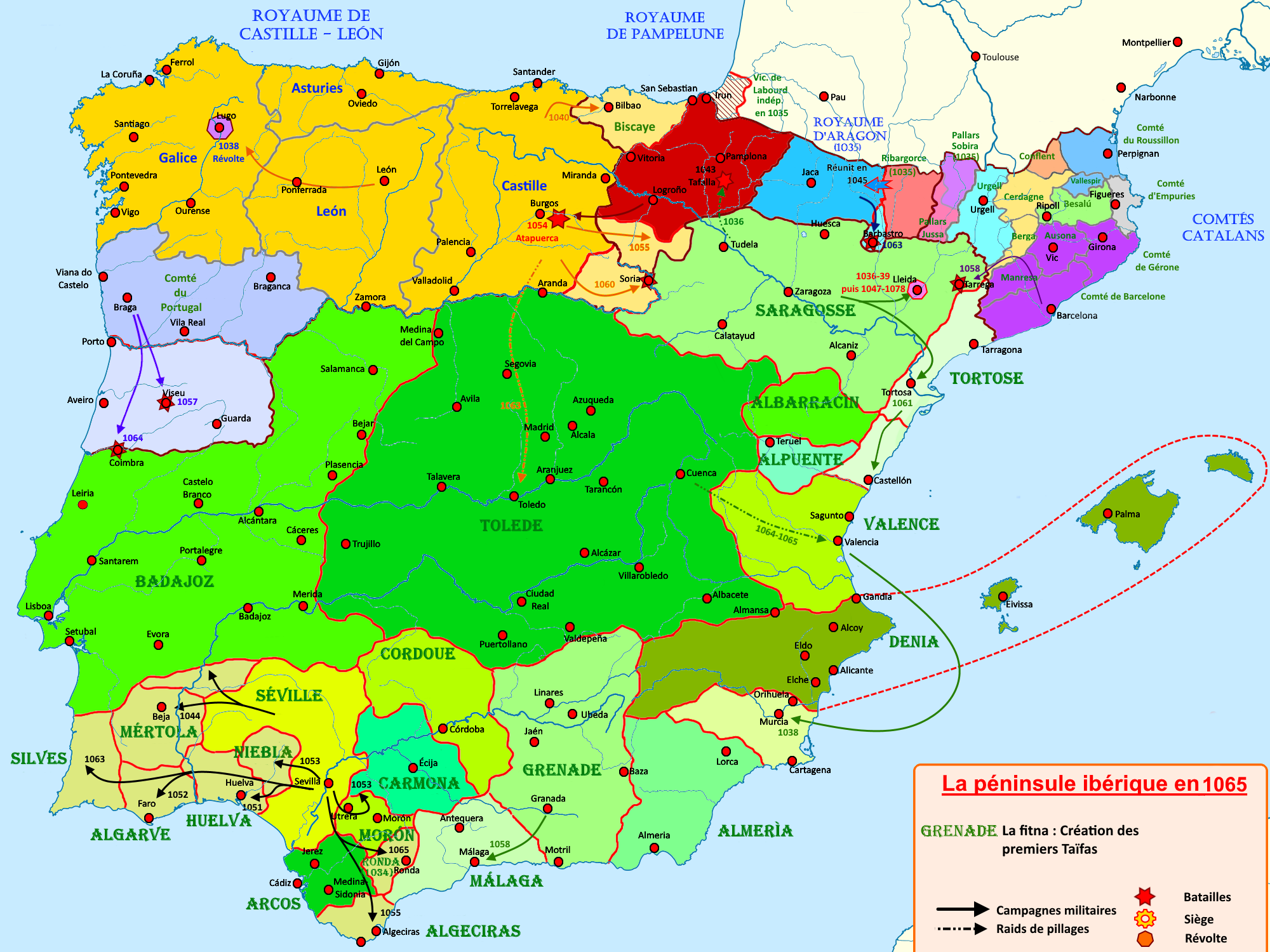
The Iberian peninsula in 1065.

- 17 April. The Aragonese city of Barbastro is recaptured by the Moors.
- Summer–Fall. After an unsuccessful Siege of Valencia, Ferdinand I of León captures the city in the Battle of Paterna.
- 24 December. Ferdinand I becomes ill after the Battle of Paterna and dies. His sons Alfonso VI of León and Garcia II of Galicia succeeded him.
- Later. Ferdinand's death triggers the War of the Three Sanchos, between three grandsons of Sancho the Great––Sancho II, Sancho Garcés IV and Sancho Ramirez.

1067

- August–September. Sancho II of Castile and León prevails in the War of the Three Sanchos. Castile annexes La Bureba, Montes de Oca and Pancorbo.

1068

- 19 July. Sancho II of Castile and León defeats his brother Alfonso VI of León at the Battle of Llantada.

=== 1071 ===
- 19 February. García II of Galicia defeats Portuguese count Nuno II Mendes at the Battle of Pedroso.
- Early June. Garcia II is overthrown by overthrown by his brothers Sancho II and Alfonso VI.

1072

- Early January. In an internecine battle among Christian kingdoms, Sancho II of Castile and León defeats Alfonso VI of León at the Battle of Golpejera. After an initial setback, El Cid rallied the Castilians to victory.
- 7 October. Sancho II is assassinated and is succeeded at Castile by his brother, now known as Alfonso VI of León and Castile, or Alfonso the Brave.

1076

- 4 June. Sancho Garcés IV is assassinated by his siblings and Sancho Ramírez becomes king of Aragon and Navarre.
- Shortly thereafter. The Kingdom of Najera is abolished.

1079

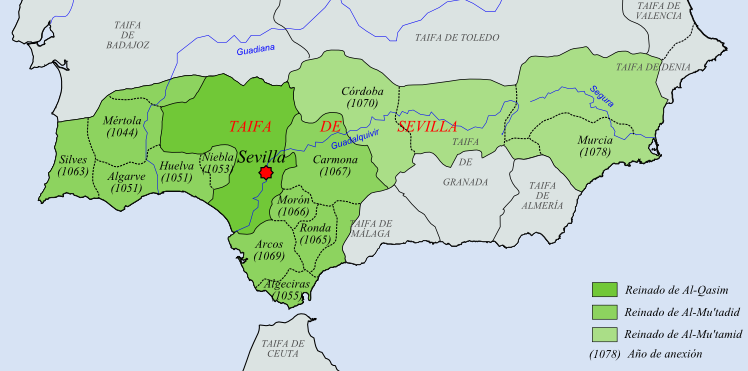
The Taifa of Sevilla in 1079

- (Date unknown). The Taifa of Seville defeats the Taifa of Granada at the Battle of Cabra. El Cid supported Seville in defeating Abdallah ibn Buluggin of Granada.

=== 1081 ===
- (Date unknown). El Cid banished from Castile by Alfonso VI.
- (Date unknown). Yusuf al-Mu'taman ibn Hud becomes ruler of Zaragoza.

1082

- Spring/Summer. The Taifa of Zaragoza under El Cid defeats the Taifa of Lleida and its Catalan allies at the Battle of Almenar. Berenguer Ramón II, count of Barcelona, is captured and released for ransom shortly thereafter.

1083

- (Date unknown). The Almoravid dynasty under Yusuf ibn Tashfin captures Ceuta.

1084

- 14 August. Aragon and Navarre under Sancho Ramírez are defeated by the forces of the Taifa of Zaragoza led by Yusuf al-Mu'tamin at the Battle of Morella. El Cid was a general for al-Mu'tamin at that time.
- 25 December. Sancho Ramírez is again defeated by Zaragoza at the Battle of Piedra Pisada, the unsuccessful culmination of Sancho's campaign into Zaragozan territory.

1085

- Autumn. Alfonso VI of León and Castile defeats Yahya al-Qadir at the second Siege of Toledo, taking the city held by the Moors since 932.

1086

- 23 October. The Moors under Yusuf ibn Tashfin defeat Alfonso VI and Álvar Fáñez at the Battle of Sagrajas.

1087

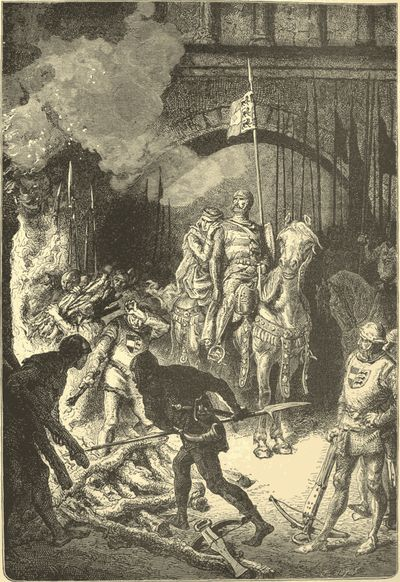
El Cid ordering the execution of Almoravid allies after his conquest of Valencia in 1094

- Spring. A French military campaign led by Odo I of Burgundy and William the Carpenter, supported by Alfonso VI and Sancho Ramirez, is turned away by the Moors at the first Siege of Tudela.

1089

- (Date unknown). Urban II grants a Crusade bull to Berenguer Ramón II and Ermengol IV of Urgell at the time of the attempted Reconquest of Tarragona.

1090

- (Date unknown). The Castilians are successful in their Siege of Aledo.

1091

- June. The Castilians are defeated by the Armoravids at the Battle of Almodóvar del Río.

=== 1094 ===
- 4 June. Peter I of Aragon becomes king upon the death of his father Sancho Ramirez.
- 17 June. El Cid conquers the Taifa of Valencia.
- 21 October. The forces of El Cid defeat the Almoravids at the Battle of Cuarte.
- November. Lisbon is captured from Raymond of Burgundy by the Almoravids led by Syr ibn Abi Bakr.

1096

- August. The First Crusade begins and Urban II later extends crusading indulgences to Spain.
- (Date unknown). Aragon completes the conquest of Huesca after the Battle of Alcoraz. Peter I of Aragon led the Aragonese forces, as supported by his brother Alfonso I of Aragon. The Moors were led by al-Musta'in II and supported by Castilians García Ordóñez de Nájera and Gonzalo Núñez de Lara.

1097

- Early. The army of Peter I of Aragon and El Cid defeats the Moors at the Battle of Bairén.
- 15 August. A Castilian and Leónese army under Alfonso VI of León and Castile is defeated by the Moors under Yusuf ibn Tashfin at the Battle of Consuegra. The Christian army included Diego Rodríguez (killed in battle), Álvar Fáñez, Pedro Ansúrez and García Ordóñez.

1099

- 10 July. El Cid dies and Valencia is ruled by his widow Jimena Díaz.
- 12 August. The First Crusade ends with the successful Battle of Ascalon. Crusaders who joined the Reconquista after returning from the Holy Land include: Gaston IV of Béarn, Rotrou III of Perche, Centule II of Bigorre, William IX of Aquitaine, Bernard Ato IV and William V of Montpellier.

== 12th century ==
=== 1100 ===
- (Date unknown). Peter I of Aragon recaptures the Aragonese city of Barbastro, making it a bishopric seat.

1102

- 5 May. Valencia taken by the Moors under Mazdali ibn Tilankan.
- 11 September. Responding to increased Moorish raids into his lands, Ramon Berenguer III attacks and is defeated at the Battle of Mollerussa. The Catalonian Ermengol V of Urgell is killed.

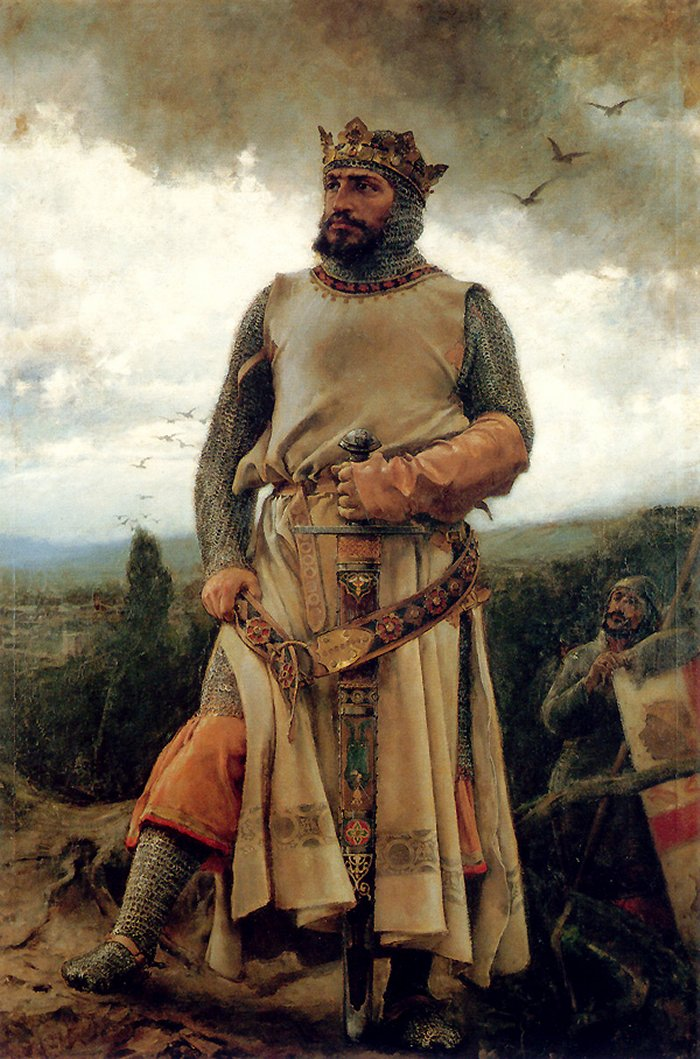
Alfonso I, the Warrior-King, by Francisco Pradilla Ortiz

1104

- 28 September. Alfonso I of Aragon (Alfonso the Battler) becomes king after the death of his brother Peter I of Aragon and Pamplona. He also served as the first king of Navarre.

1106

- (Date unknown). Ali ibn Yusuf becomes ruler of the Almoravid dynasty.
- (Date unknown). The city of Balaguer and its citadel are captured from the Almoravids, with forces led by Ermengol VI of Urgell and Pedro Ansúrez.

1107

- Autumn. The Norwegian Crusade led by Sigurd the Crusader begins with attacks on Iberia.

1108

- 29 May. The Moors defeat the forces of Alfonso VI of León and Castile at the Battle of Uclés. The Castilians lose Alfonso VI's son Sancho Alfónsez, Martín Flaínez and Fernando Díaz.
- Autumn. With the death of his only son, Alfonso VI names his daughter Urraca as his legitimate heir and marries her to Alfonso I of Aragon in early 1109.

1109

- 1 July. With the death of her father Alfonso VI, Urraca of León and Castile becomes queen.
- Later. Coria falls to the Moors.
- (Date unknown). The Norwegians take control of the city from the Moors after the Siege of Lisbon.
- (Date unknown). Sigurd the Crusader attacks Formentera in the Balearic Islands.

=== 1110 ===
Urraca's realm in 1118

- 24 January. Battle of Valtierra is fought between forces from Navarre and Zaragoza. The Navarrese defenders were victorious and the king of Zaragaoza, al-Musta'in II, was killed.
- May. Urraca and Alfonso I of Aragon separate.

1111

- 25 May. The Moors under Syr ibn Abi Bakr attack the County of Portugal and succeed in the Capture of Santarém, overwhelming the forces of Henry of Portugal.
- 26 October. The forces of Alfonso I of Aragon defeats those of Urraca at the Battle of Candespina. Urraca's lover Gómez González is killed, to be replaced by Pedro González de Lara.
- Late Autumn. Alfonso I defeats the Kingdom of Galicia, allies his estranged wife Urraca, at the Battle of Viadangos. Urraca's son and co-ruler, Alfonso VII of León and Castile escapes.
- (Date unknown). Santiago de Compostela becomes the capital of Galicia.

1114

- June. Ramon Berenguer III leads the Balearic Islands Expedition, capturing the islands from the Taifa of Dénia in August 1115.
- August. William V of Montpellier, as part of this expedition, captures Majorca from the Moors.

1116

- (Date unknown). Ramon Berenguer III travels to Rome to petition Paschal II for a crusade to liberate Tarragona.

1117

- 2 June. Ali ibn Yusuf fails in his attempt to capture the city in the second Siege of Coimbra. The city's defense was mounted by Theresa of Portugal, the half-sister of Urraca.
- (No earlier than). Liber maiolichinus de gestis Pisanorum illustribus is written, detailing the Balearic Islands Expedition.
- (Date unknown). Crónicas anónimas de Sahagún is written by the monks of Sahagún describing the early reign of Urraca of León and Castile.

1118

- Early. Pope Gelasius II grants a Crusade bull to Alfonso I of Aragon after he undertook to an operation reconquer Zaragoza.
- May–December. The Conquest of Zaragoza was led by Alfonso I and allowed him to take the city of Zaragoza from the Moors. The king was supported by Gaston IV of Béarn, Centule II of Bigorre and Rotrou III of Perche. It subsequently became the capital of Aragon under the lordship of Gaston IV.
- (Date estimated). Historia silense is written, providing a narrative history of the Iberia from the time of the Visigoths to the first years of the reign of Alfonso VI of León and Castile.

1119

- (Date unknown). Alfonso I of Aragon conquers the city in the second Siege of Tudela. First Crusade veterans Rotrou III of Perche and Centule II of Bigorre participated in the siege, and Rotrou III became lord of the city.

=== 1120 ===
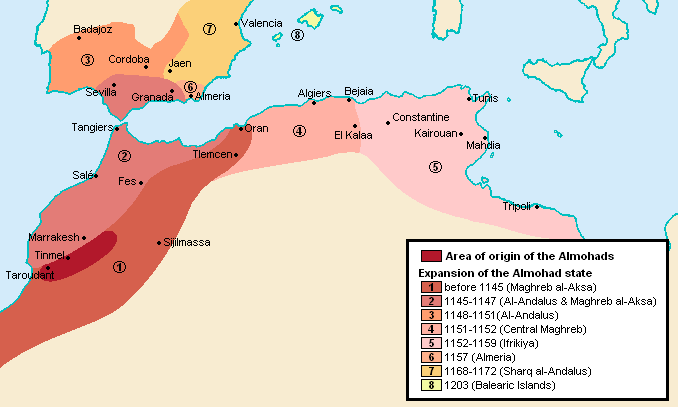
Phases of the expansion of the Almohad Caliphate.

- June. defeats the Almoravids at the Battle of Cutanda.
- 24 June. Alfonso I of Aragon successfully leads the Siege of Calatayud.
- (Date unknown). William IX of Aquitaine joins forces with the Castilians in an unsuccessful effort to take Cordoba.
- (Date unknown). Ramon Berenguer III achieves the reconquest of Tarragona.

1121

- (Date unknown). Almohad Caliphate founded under Ibn Tumart.

1122

- (Date unknown). Callixtus II declares a crusade in Spain.

1123

- 18 March. The First Council of the Lateran rules that the crusades to the Holy Land and the Reconquista of Spain were of equal standing, granting equal privileges.

1124

- Not earlier than. Historia Roderici, an early history of El Cid, is written.

1125

- 2 September. Alfonso I launches the Granada campaign to attempt to capture the city. He is supported by Gaston IV of Béarn, Centule II of Bigorre and Rotrou III of Perche.

1126

- 8 March. Alfonso VII of León and Castile becomes Imperator totius Hispaniae upon the death of his mother Urraca.
- 10 March. As part of the Granada campaign, the Aragonese forces led by Alfonso the Battler defeat the Almoravids at the Battle of Arnisol.
- 23 June. Ali ibn Yusuf stops the Granada campaign from meeting its objectives.
- (Date unknown). The Moors defeat the Catalan forces of Ramon Berenguer III at the Battle of Corbins.
- (Date approximate). Anales castellanos segundos was written.

1127

- June. The Peace of Támara is signed which delimited the territorial domains of Alfonso I of Aragón and Alfonso VII of Castile.

=== 1130 ===
- May. The Moors defeat Aragon at the Battle of Valencia. The viscount Gaston IV of Béarn is killed in the fighting.
- October. Alfonso I of Aragon launches the Siege of Bayonne against the Aquitainian city of Bayonne defended by William X of Aquitaine. The siege was lifted after a year without success.

1131

- (Date unknown). The Castilians are defeated by the Almoravids at the Battle of Alamín.

1133

- January–September. The first Andalusian campaign led by Alfonso VII of León and Castile with the support of Zafadola and Rodrigo González de Lara against the Almoravids was successful although no territory was occupied.
- (Date unknown). Abd al-Mu'min becomes the first ruler of the Almohad dynasty.

1134

- March. Tashfin ibn Ali defeats a Castilian raiding party at the Battle of Badajoz.
- 17 July. Moors defeat Alfonso I of Aragon at the Battle of Fraga. Christian casualtites included Guy of Lescar (captured) and among the killed were Aimery II of Narbonne, Centula VI of Béarn and Bertrán de Risnel.
- 11 September. Alfonso I of Aragon dies and is succeeded by Ramiro II of Aragon and García Ramírez of Navarre in those territories as Navarre gains its independence. He is succeeded by Alfonso VII of León and Castile as Imperator totius Hispaniae alongside his mother Urraca.

1137

- 13 November. Petronilla of Aragon becomes queen after the abdication of her father Ramiro II of Aragon. She was the last ruling member of the Jiménez Dynasty.

1138

- July. At the first Siege of Coria, Alfonso VII of León and Castile fails in his attempt to take the city, an action in which his general Rodrigo Martínez was killed.
- (Date unknown). (Date unknown). The Castilians are defeated by the Almoravids at the Battle of Guadalquivir.

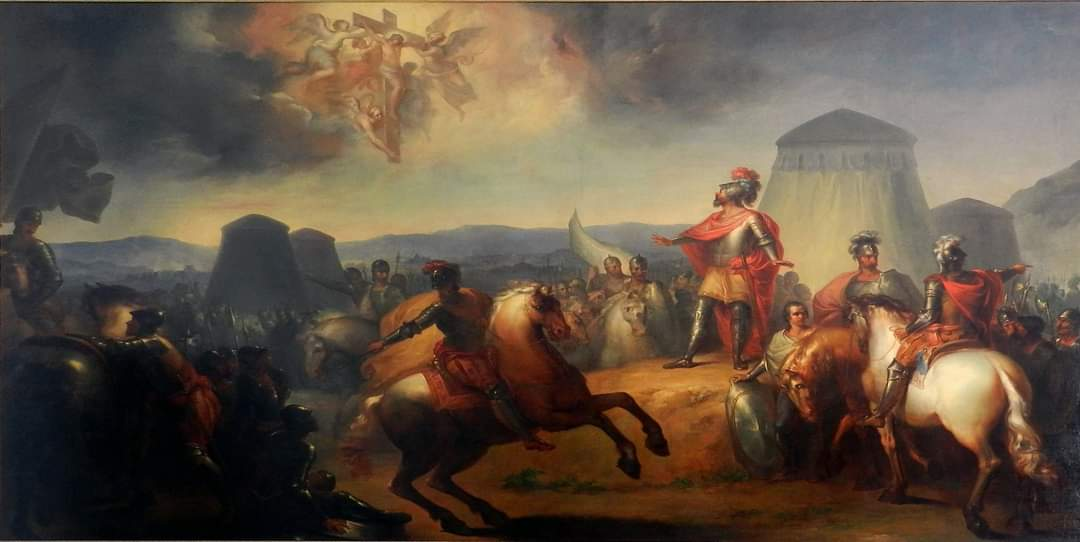
The Miracle of Ourique by Domingos Sequeira (1793)

1139

- April – October. Alfonso VII of León and Castile wins the first major victory against the Moors in the Reconquista at the Siege of Oreja.
- 25 July. Afonso Henriques defeats the Moors at the Battle of Ourique.
- Shortly thereafter. Kingdom of Portugal is declared and Alfonso Henriques becomes Afonso I of Portugal.
- Date approximate. The historical chronicle of Galicia Historia Compostelana is written.

=== 1140 ===
- Summer. Alfonso I of Portugal defeats his cousin Alfonso VII of León and Castile at the Battle of Valdevez.
- (Approximate). The Castilian epic poem about El Cid, Cantar de mio Cid, is written.
- (Approximate). The Chanson de Guillaume, a chanson de geste about William of Gellone, is written.

1142

- May – June. Alfonso VII of León and Castile takes the city from the Moors in the second Siege of Coria.
- Summer. Crusaders en route to Jerusalem asked by Afonso I of Portugal to take Lisbon, but fail to take the city after the first Siege of Lisbon.
- (Date unknown). Peter the Venerable commissions the first Latin translation of the Quran, Lex Mahumet pseudoprophete. This becomes part of the Corpus Cluniacense.

1143

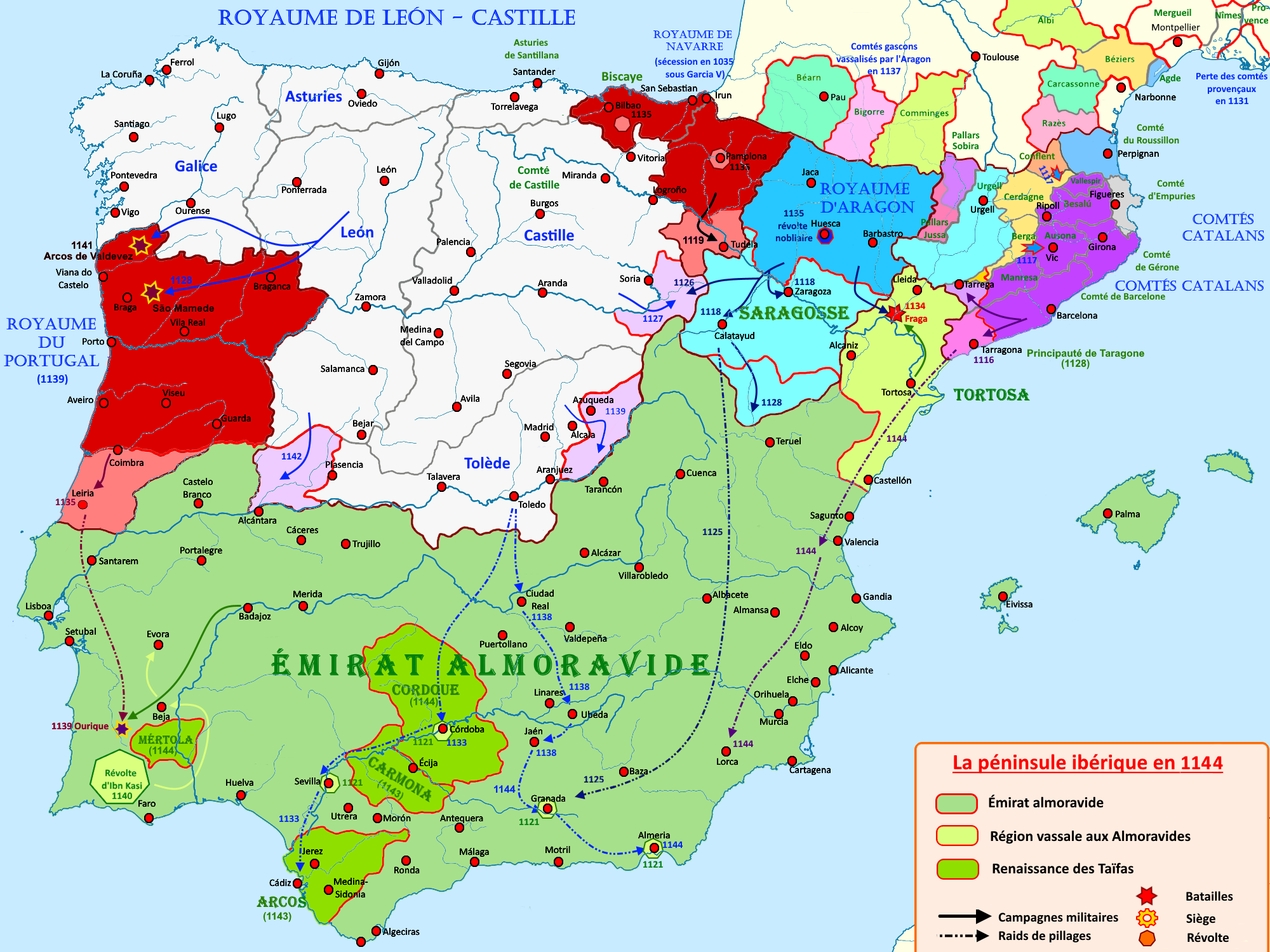
The Iberian peninsula in 1144.

- 1 March. Muño Alfonso and an army of knights from Ávila, Segovia, and Toledo defeats Moors at the Battle of Montiel.
- 5 October. The Treaty of Zamora officially recognizes the independence of Portugal from the Kingdom of León.

1144

- (Date unknown). The first stronghold of the Knights Templar is established in the Kingdom of León and Castile.

1145

- 1 December. Pope Eugene III issues the bull Quantum praedecessores calling for the Second Crusade.

1146

- 5 February. The Castilians defeat Sayf al-Dawla at the Battle of Albacete.
- May. Alfonso VII of León and Castile is successful in his Siege of Córdoba, forcing Yahya ibn Ghaniya, the Almoravid governor of Al-Andalus, to become a vassal of Alfonso.
- (Date unknown). The Military Order of Aviz, a body of Portuguese knights, is founded to fight the Moors.
- (Date unknown). The Almohads arrive in Iberia, leading to the Almohad wars.

1147

- 15 March. Afonso I of Portugal completes the Conquest of Santarém.
- Spring. Eugene III extends the Second Crusade to Iberia.
- April. Emir Ishaq ibn Ali, the last of the Almoravid rulers, dies, and the Almohads seize control of the Moorish principalities in Iberia. The Almohads then transferred the capital of Muslim Iberia from Córdoba to Seville.
- Later. Abd al-Mu'min becomes the first ruler of the Almohad Caliphate with the Almohad conquest of Marrakesh.

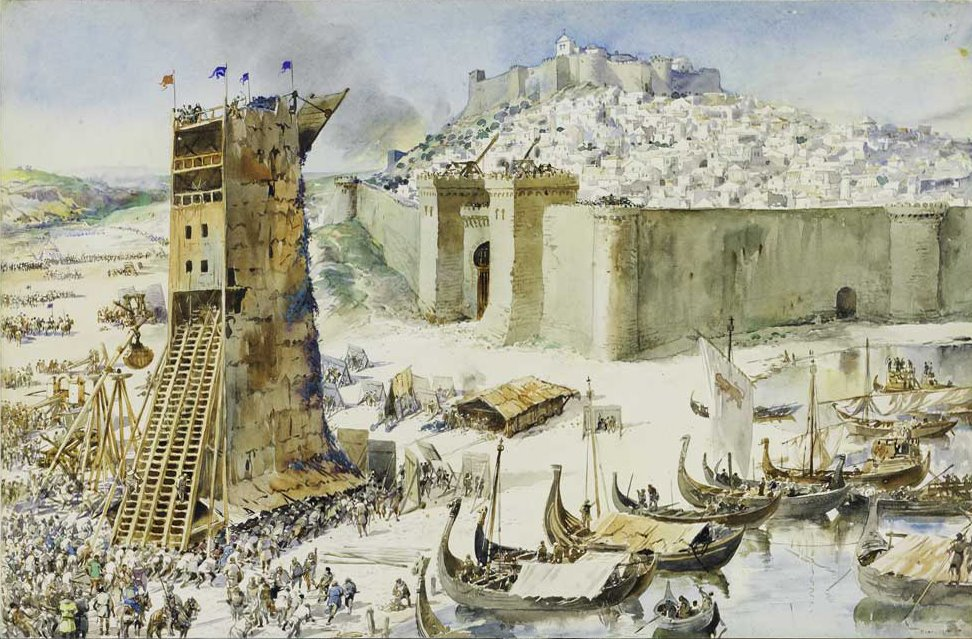
The Conquest of Lisbon by Alfredo Roque Gameiro (1917).

- 1 July – 25 October. In one of the few successes of the Second Crusade, Crusaders led by Hervey de Glanvill and Arnout IV of Aarschot, in concert with Afonso I of Portugal, defeat the Moors at the second Siege of Lisbon.
- July – 17 October. The forces of Alfonso VII of León and Castile are successful in the Siege of Almería. They were supported by Ramon Berenguer IV of Barcelona.
- Approximate. De expugnatione Lyxbonensi, an account of the second Siege of Lisbon, is written.

1148

- 1 July – 30 December. Ramon Berenguer IV leads a multi-national force in the successful Siege of Tortosa as part of the Second Crusade.

1149

- Summer/Fall. Eugene III sends Englishman Nicholas Breakspear (the future pope Adrian IV) on a mission to Catalonia.
- 24 October. Lérida falls to forces from Barcelona under Ramon Berenguer IV.
- Later. The women of Tortosa were honored with the formation of the Order of the Hatchet.

=== 1150 ===
- 21 November. Sancho VI of Navarre (the Wise) becomes king.

1153

- (Date unknown). Eugene III again authorizes a crusade in Spain.

1154

- (Date unknown). The chronicle Crónica de Alaón renovada written.

1157

- 21 August. Alfonso VII of Léon and Castile dies. Castile and Léon are divided, ruled by his sons Sancho III of Castile (who also rules Toledo) and Ferdinand II of León (who also rules Galicia).
- No earlier than. The Chronica Adefonsi Imperatoris is written. It is later appended by the Prefatio de Almaria.
- (Date unknown). Pope Adrian IV rejects the calls for a crusade in Spain made by Henry II of England and Louis VII of France.

1158

- 31 August. Alfonso VIII of Castile becomes king.
- (Date unknown). Upon the death of Abd al-Mu'min, his son Abu Yaqub Yusuf becomes the second Almohad caliph.
- Later. Sworn enemies of the Almohads, Ibn Mardanīš (the Wolf King) and his stepfather Ibrahim ibn Hamusk allied with Alfonso VIII of Castile and laid siege on Córdoba by 1158–1160, ravaging the surroundings but failing to take the city.

=== 1164 ===
- 18 July. Alfonso II of Aragon becomes king under the regency of his mother Petronilla, ushering in the rule of the House of Barcelona in Aragon.
- 26 September. Pope Alexander III recognizes the Order of Calatrava.

1165

- 15 October. The invading Almohads led by the brothers of caliph Abu Yaqub Yusuf defeat the Taifa of Murcia under Ibn Mardanīš at the Battle of Fahs al-Jullab.

1166

- September. Évora taken by Portuguese warrior and folk hero Gerald the Fearless.

1169

- 21 May. The Moors, supported by Ferdinand II of León, defeat Afonso I of Portugal and Gerald the Fearless at the Siege of Badajoz.

=== 1170 ===
- (Date unknown). The Order of Santiago (Order of Saint James of Compostela) is founded to defend Christianity and expel the Moors from Iberia.

1172

- (Date unknown). The Military Order of Saint James of the Sword is founded in Portugal.

1174

- (Date unknown). The Order of Mountjoy is founded by Rodrigo Álvarez to protect Christian pilgrims in the Iberian Peninsula.

1175

- (Date unknown). Pope Alexander III calls for a crusade in Spain.

1177

- 6 January – 21 September. The Christians are successful in their Conquest of Cuenca.
- (Date unknown). Alexander III recognizes the Order of Alcántara (Knights of St. Julian), founded in León in 1166.

1178

- May–July. The Portuguese conduct the Triana raid against Extremadura and Alentejo.

1179

- 23 May. Alexander III issues the bull Manifestis Probatum, recognizing Alfonso I of Portugal as king.

=== 1184 ===
- June–July. Abu Yaqub Yusuf crosses the straits of Gibraltar and marched inland. He was stopped by Afonso I of Portugal and Ferdinand II of León at the Siege of Santarém. Abu Yaqub Yusuf was killed during the siege and was succeeded by his son Yaqub al-Mansur.
- (Date unknown). The first version of the Gesta comitum Barcinonensium is written.

1185

- 6 December. Sancho I of Portugal (the Populator) becomes king.
- Approximate. The chronicle of Portuguese history Chronicon Lusitanum is written.

1187

- 29 October. Pope Gregory VIII issues the bull Audita tremendi calling for the Third Crusade.

1188

- 22 January. Ferdinand II of León dies and is succeeded by his son Alfonso IX of León.

1189

- June. A Holy Roman Empire fleet, supported by Denmark and Flanders, en route to the Holy Land stop in the Algarve and attack the castle there in the Alvor massacre.
- 21 July – 3 September. Sancho I of Portugal teams with Crusaders en route to the Holy Land defeat the Moors at the Siege of Silves. The siege is later documented in the Narratio de itinere navali and Epistola de morte Friderici imperatoris, and started the Almohad campaign against Portugal.

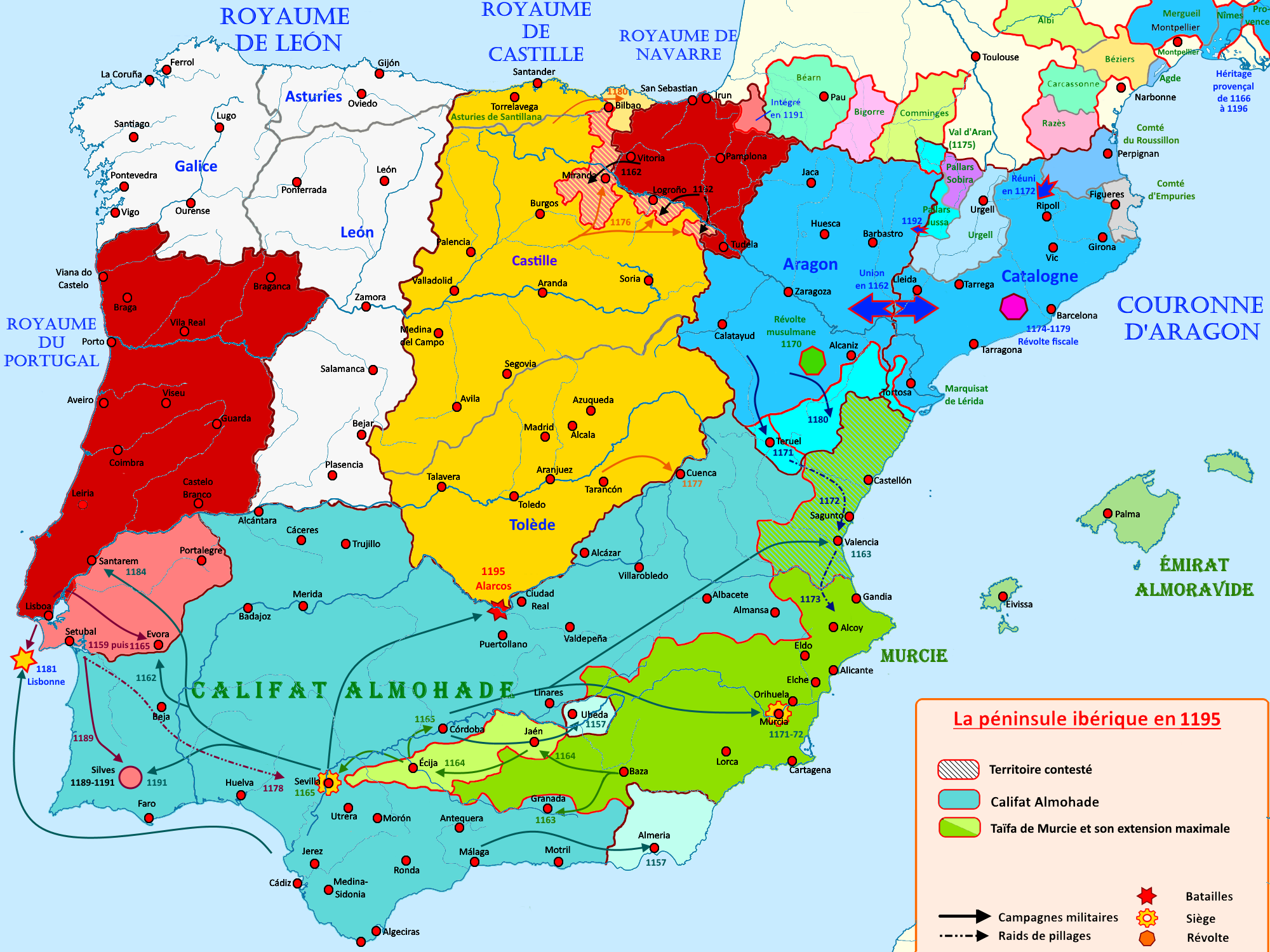
The Iberian Peninsula in 1195.

=== 1190 ===
- Spring. A northern fleet en route to the Holy Land fought a battle with the Moors and is defeated at the Strait of Gibraltar.
- 13–19 July. The Knights Templar under Gualdim Pais successfully repel the Moors at the Siege of Tomar.

1191

- 12 May. Berengaria of Navarre marries Richard the Lionheart in Cyprus. She was the eldest daughter of Sancho VI of Navarre and Sancha of Castile.

1193

- (Date unknown). Pope Celestine III calls for a crusade in Spain.

1194

- 27 June. Sancho VII of Navarre (the Strong) becomes king, the last of the Jiménez dynasty.
- (Date unknown). The Chronica Naierensis is written.

1195

- 18 July. The Almohads led by caliph Yaqub al-Mansur attacked the Kingdom of Castile at the Battle of Alarcos. Castilian forces led by Alfonso VIII of Castile and Diego López II de Haro were defeated, retreating to Toledo as the Almohads reconquered Trujillo, Montánchez, and Talavera. Castilian rebels led by Pedro Fernández de Castro supported the Moors.
- Later. Alfonso IX of León invades Castile and is excommunicated by Celestine III.

1196

- 25 April. Peter II of Aragon becomes king.

1197

- (Date unknown). Celestine III again calls for a crusade in Spain.
- (Date unknown). Knights of the Order of Calatrava take Salvatierra Castle from the Moors, holding it until 1211.
- (Date unknown). Alfonso IX of León marries Berengaria of Castile.

== 13th century ==
1209

- July. The Cathars reject the authority of the Crown of Aragon, resulting in the Albigensian Crusade.

1210

- (Date unknown). The forces of Peter II of Aragon, as supported by the Knights Templar (under Peire de Montagut) and the Knights Hospitaller, defeat the defending Moorish forces at the Siege of al-Dāmūs.

1211

- 26 March. Afonso II of Portugal (the Fat) becomes king.
- (Date unknown). Muhammad al-Nasir crosses the strait of Gibraltar and seizes Salvatierra Castle.

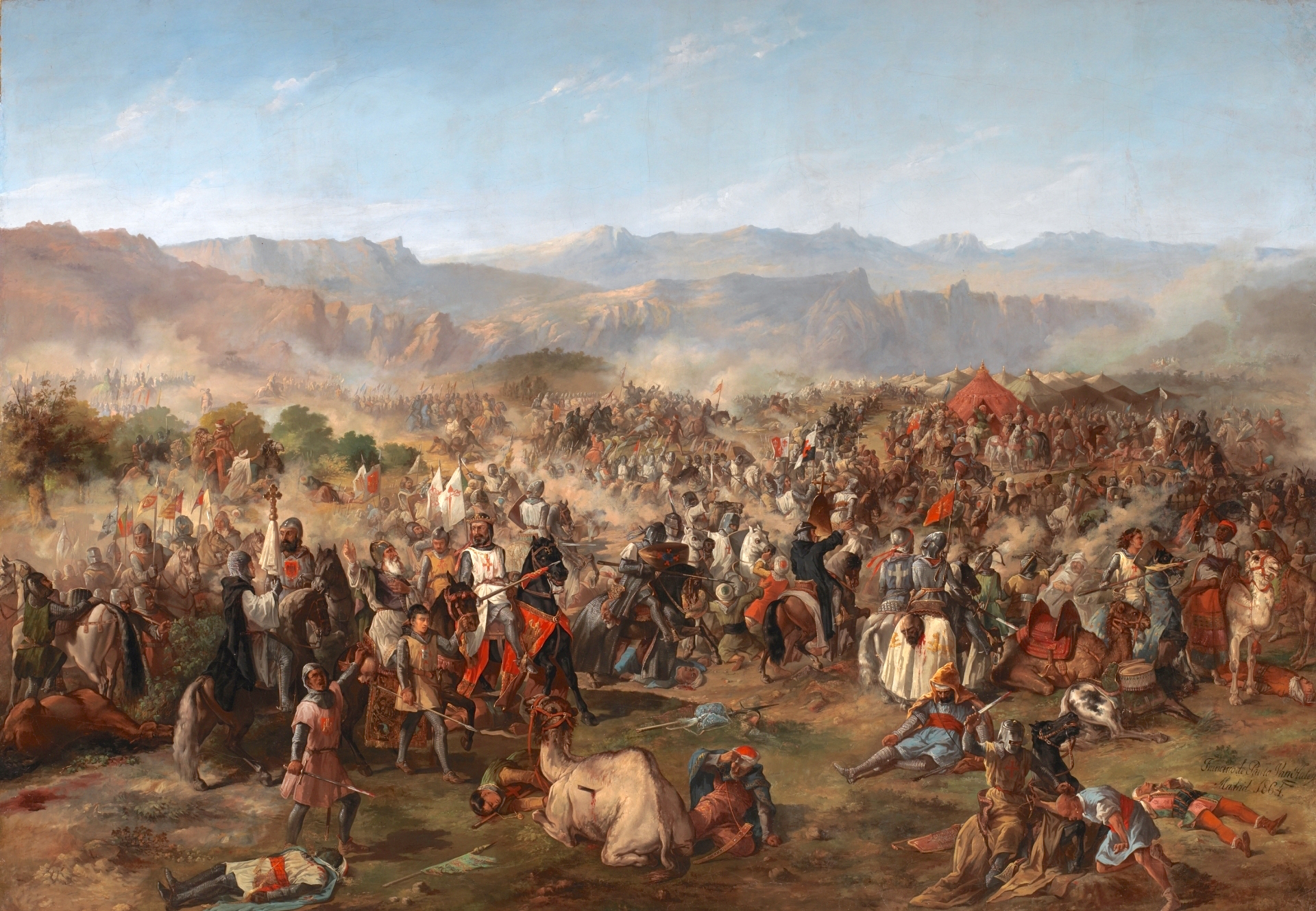
The Battle of Las Navas de Tolosa by Francisco de Paula Van Halen (1864)

1212

- (Date unknown). Pope Innocent III calls for a crusade in Spain.
- 16 July. Alfonso VIII of Castile, Sancho VII of Navarre and Peter II of Aragon defeat the Moorish forces under Muhammad al-Nasir at the Battle of Las Navas de Tolosa.
- August. Following their victory as Las Navas de Tolosa, the Crusades capture Ubeda.

1213

- 12 September. Peter II of Aragon dies fighting in the Battle of Muret and his son James I of Aragon (the Conqueror) becomes king.

1214

- 5 October. Henry I of Castile becomes king under the regency of his sister Berengaria.

1215

- 11 November. The Fourth Lateran Council downgrades Iberian activities in favor of the Fifth Crusade.
- (Date unknown). Marinid Sultanate begins in Morocco under Berber Abd al-Haqq I.

1217

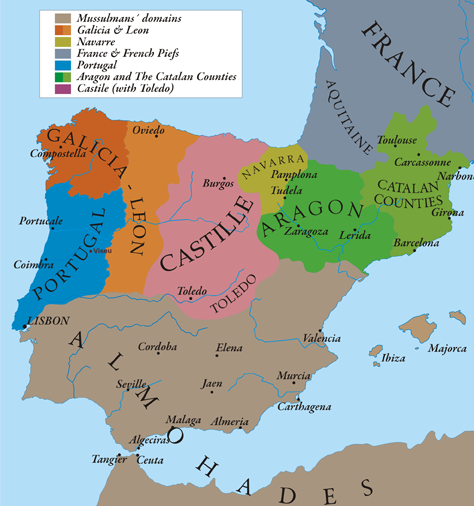
The Iberian Peninsula in 1210

- 6 June. Berengaria of Castile becomes queen upon the death of Henry I of Castile.
- 1 July. Forces depart France on the Fifth Crusade.
- 30 July – 18 October. Portugal and the Crusaders under Soeiro II of Lisbon and William I of Holland defeat the Moors at the Siege of Alcácer do Sal, the first engagement of the Fifth Crusade.
- 31 August. Ferdinand III of Castile becomes king upon the abdication of his mother Berengaria of Castile.

1218

- November–December. Siege of Cáceres, organized by Alfonso IX of León, fails to capture the city of Cáceres from the Almohad Caliphate. The siege is abandoned due to heavy rains and flooding.

1219

- No earlier than. The chronicles Gesta crucigerorum Rhenanorum, Carmen de expugnatione Salaciae, and first part of Anales toledanos are written.
- (Date unknown). Rodrigo Jiménez de Rada leads the first Crusade against Requena. The crusade was unsuccessful as was the second crusade in 1220.

=== 1223 ===
- 24 March. Sancho II of Portugal (the Pious) becomes king.

1225

- Late. The Portuguese Raid of Seville inflicts a bruising defeat on the Almohads forces and proceeds to pillage the outskirts of Seville and massacre its population.
- (Date unknown). At the first Siege of Jaén, the forces of the Taifa of Jayyān led Christian knight Álvaro Pérez de Castro defeat the forces of Ferdinand III of Castile and the Taifa of Baeza.

1228

- (Date unknown). Ibn Hud seizes power over much of al-Andalus.

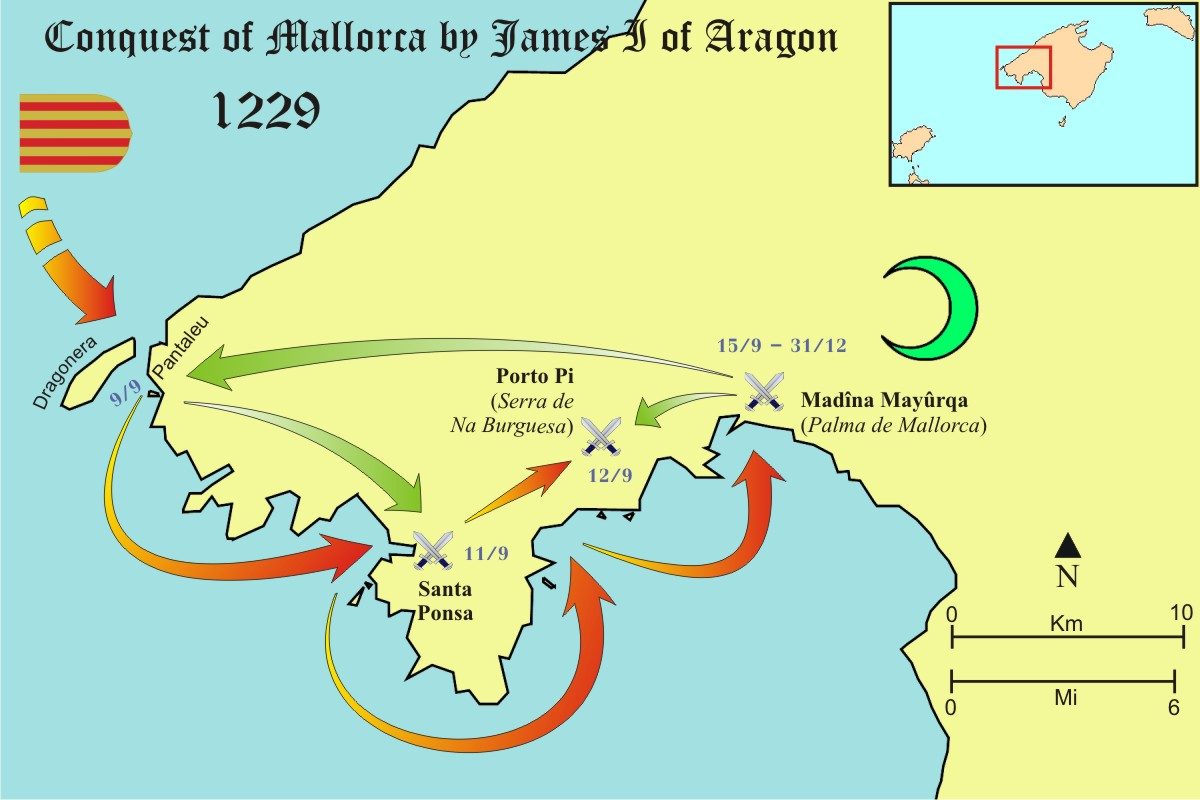
Conquest of Majorca by James I of Aragon (1229)

1229

- 13 February. Gregory IX issues a papal bull calling for a new crusade in Spain.
- 5 September. James I of Aragon begins the Conquest of Majorca resulting in the creation of the Kingdom of Majorca. James was supported by William II of Béarn, Berenguer de Palou II, Nuño Sánchez and Peter I of Urgell. The wali of Majorca, Abu Yahya, was defeated and was the last to serve in that role.
- 12 September. The Aragonese win the first engagement at Majorca at the Battle of Portopí.
- (Date unknown). Valencia falls to Zayyan ibn Mardanish, an opponent of the Almohades.

=== 1230 ===
- Spring/Summer. Badajoz and Mérida are conquered by Alfonso IX of León.
- March. The Aragonese are successful in their Siege of Artà.
- 24 June. The forces of Ferdinand III of Castile and García Fernández de Villamayor fail in their second Siege of Jaén.
- 24 September. Alfonso IX of León dies. Shortly thereafter, Ferdinand III of Castile invades León and, later Galicia.
- 30 October. The Conquest of Majorca is completed.
- 11 December. The Treaty of Benavente is signed, in which Sancha and Dulce, the heiresses of the Kingdom of León, renounced their throne to their brother, Ferdinand III of Castile.

1231

- (Date unknown). The crusade of Ferdinand III of Castile begins.
- (Date unknown). The forces of Ferdinand III of Castile led by Alfonso de Molina and Álvaro Pérez de Castro defeat those of Ibn Hud at the Battle of Jerez, leading to the rise of Muhammad I of Granada.
- (Estimated date). Goswin of Bossut writes De expugnatione Salaciae carmen, a song celebrating the Siege of Alcácer do Sal, and possibly De expugnatione Scalabis, an account of the Portuguese Conquest of Santarém.

1232

- 13 July. The Nasrid dynasty begins ruling the Emirate of Granada under Muhammad I of Granada, the first sultan of Granada.
- (Date unknown). James I of Aragon begins his campaign against the Moors occupying Valencia.

1233

- May–July. As part of his Valencian campaign, James I of Aragon and Bernat Guillem d'Entença defeat Zayyan ibn Mardanish at the Siege of Burriana.

1234

- 7 April. Theobald I of Navarre becomes king.

1236

- 29 June. Ferdinand III of Castile captures Córdoba from Ibn Hud after the Siege of Córdoba, regaining the city held by the Moors since 711.

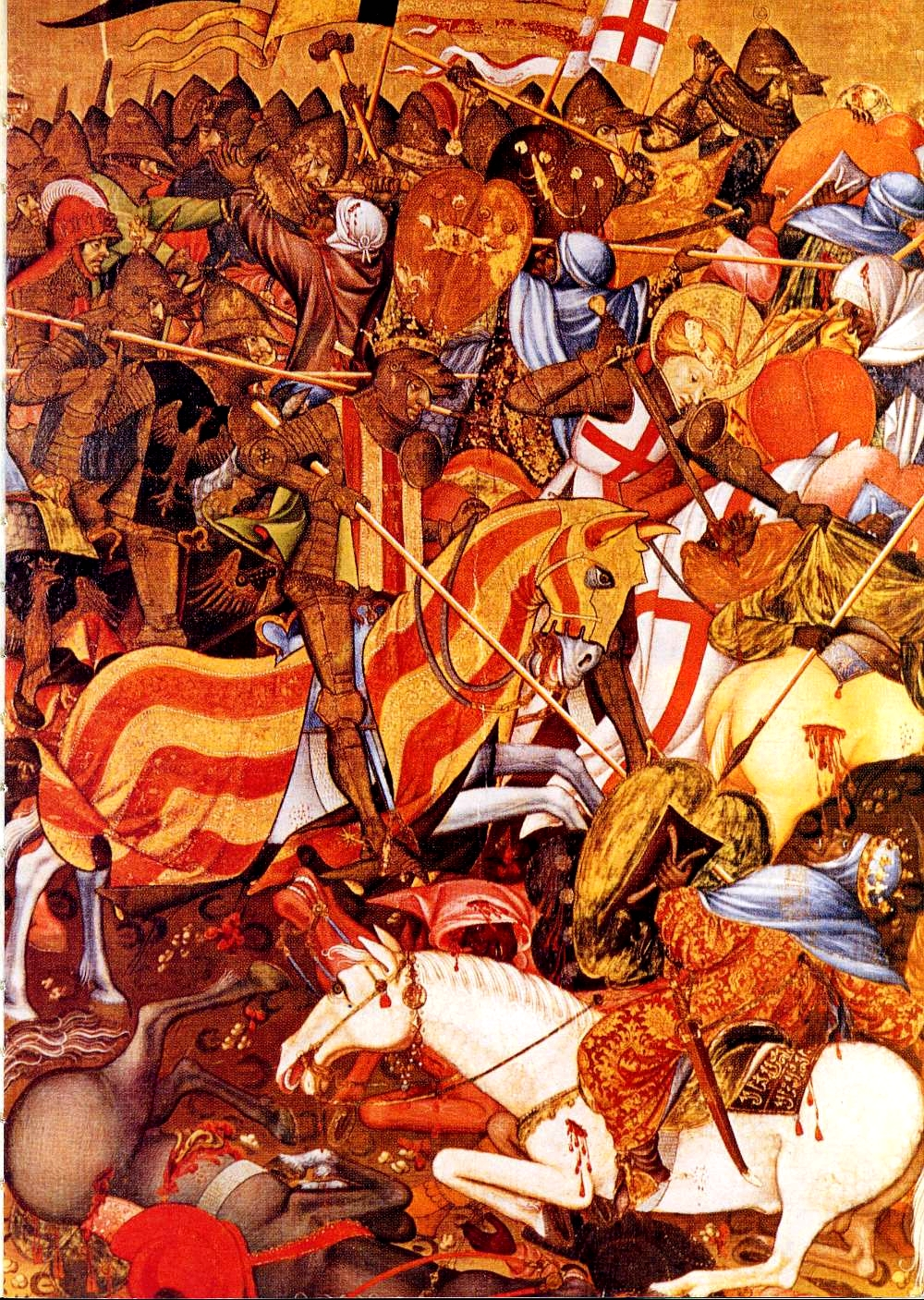
The Battle of the Puig de Santa Maria by Andrés Marzal de Sas.

1237

- 15 August. James I of Aragon and Bernat Guillem d'Entença defeat Zayyan ibn Mardanish at the Battle of the Puig, completing their Valencian campaign.

1238

- Spring. The Portuguese conquest of the Algarve begins.
- (Date unknown). The Taifa of Valencia becomes part of Aragon.
- (Date unknown). Ibn Hud is assassinated.

1239

- 2 November. Theobald I of Navarre initiates the Barons' Crusade.

=== 1243 ===
- (Date unknown). De rebus Hispaniae is written on behalf of Ferdinand III of Castile.

1244

- 22 May. The Moors surrender Xativa Castle to James I of Aragon following a five-month siege. The terms of surrender of the Moors were laid out in the subsequent Treaty of Xàtiva.
- (Date unknown). Arjona, the home of Muhammad I of Granada, is taken by Ferdinand III of Castile.

1246

- 28 February. Kingdom of Castile and the Order of Santiago commanded by Ferdinand III of Castile and Grand Master Pelayo Pérez Correa defeat a defending force of the Taifa of Jaén and the Emirate of Granada under Muhammad I of Granada at the Third Siege of Jaén.
- March. Muhammad I enters into peace agreement with Castile and Granada becomes its vassal.
- 15 April. James I of Aragon and his son-in-law Alfonso X of Castile enter into the Al-Azraq Treaty of 1245 with Moorish commander al-Azraq.

A map of Southern Spain around the time of Muhammad I, including the Emirate of Granada which he was to found. Green/pale yellow: Granada.

1247

- July. Castile begins the Siege of Seville.

1248

- 4 January. Afonso III of Portugal becomes king.
- 28 November. Ferdinand III of Castile, supported by Ramón de Bonifaz, defeats the Moors led by Axataf after the 16-month Siege of Seville.

1249

- March. Afonso III of Portugal and Paio Peres Correia capture the Algarve from the Taifa of Niebla after the Siege of Faro. This marked the end of the Portuguese conquest of the Algarve and therefore their Reconquista efforts in the Iberian peninsula.

=== 1252 ===
- 1 June. Alfonso X of Castile becomes king.

1253

- 8 July. Theobald II of Navarre becomes king.

=== 1260 ===
- 10–23 September. After the Battle of Salé, a Castilian fleet sent by Alfonso X of Castile temporarily occupies Salé in Morocco.
- 24 October. Baybars becomes Mamluk sultan of Egypt. He later signs commercial treaties with James I of Aragon and Alfonso X of Castile (dates unknown).

1261

- 25 November. After the 11-month Siege of Jerez, the Moorish enclave of Jerez de la Frontera is incorporated into the Crown of Castile. The head of the House of Lara, Castilian nobleman Nuño González de Lara is appointed Castilian of the Alcázar of Jerez de la Frontera.

1264

- (Date unknown). The Mudéjar revolt of the Muslim population of Castile begins, and is not put down until 1266.

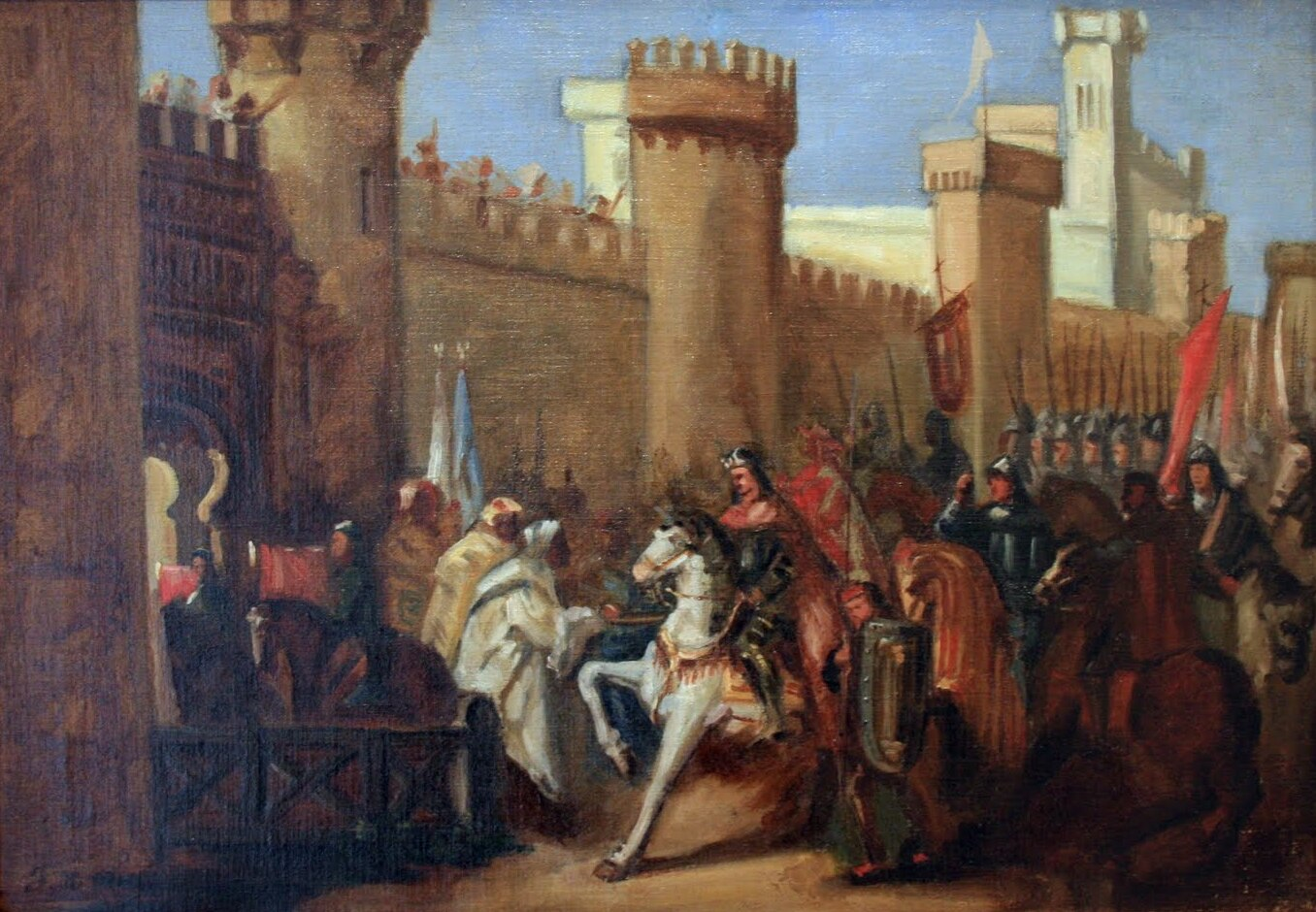
James I of Aragon entering the city after the Conquest of Murcia, February 1266.

1265

- October. James I of Aragon begins the Conquest of Murcia, taking the Muslim-held Taifa of Murcia on behalf of his ally Alfonso X of Castile. He is supported by Manuel of Castile and Paio Peres Correia.
- Fall–Winter. Clement IV issues a general Crusade bull for the whole of Spain, when the kings of Aragon and Castile joined in the expedition against the Taifa of Murcia.

1266

- 31 January. Murcia surrenders to James I of Aragon.

1267

- 16 February. The Treaty of Badajoz is signed between Alfonso X of Castile and Afonso III of Portugal, agreeing to establish lines of mutual assistance and friendship. Based on the terms of the accord, Alfonso X surrendered all rights to the Kingdom of the Algarve.

1269

- 1 September. Fernando Sánchez de Castro and Pedro Fernández de Híjar begin the Crusade of the Infants of Aragon, abandoning it the next year with no results.

=== 1270 ===
- 4 December. Henry I of Navarre becomes king.

1271

- (Date unknown). The Gran conquista de Ultramar, a late 13th-century Castilian chronicle of the crusades for the period 1095–1271, is written.

1272

- (Not earlier than). The Spanish history Estoria de España is written.

1273

- 22 January. Muhammad II of Granada becomes sultan of the Emirate of Granada.

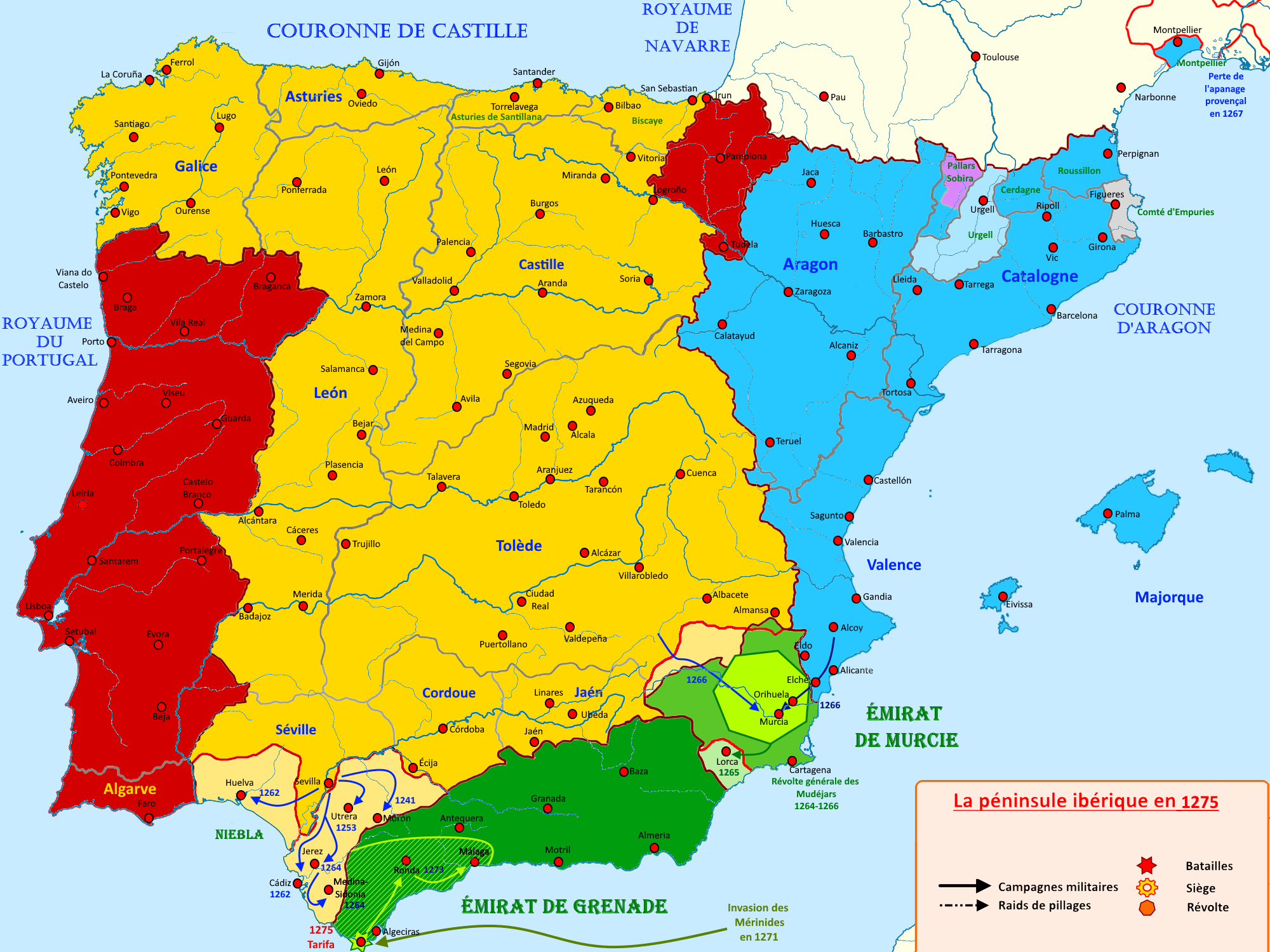
Granada and its neighbours in 1275.

1274

- 22 July. Joan I of Navarre becomes queen upon the death of her father Henry I of Navarre.
- November. Fernando de la Cerda becomes regent of the Crown of Castile during the absence of his father Alfonso X of Castile.

1275

- 13 May. Marinid forces led by Abu Yusuf Yaqub begin their first Invasion of Spain.
- 25 June. Fernando de la Cerda, regent of Castile, dies, leaving the kingdom open to the invading Marinid forces.
- 8 September. The Moors defeat Castile at the Battle of Écija. The Castilian commander Nuño González de Lara is killed in action.
- 21 October. The Moors defeat the army of Castile led by Sancho II de Aragon at the Battle of Martos. Sancho II was killed and Alfonso X of Castile was forced to accept a peace treaty.

1276

- 19 January. Abu Yusuf Yaqub ends his invasion of Spain, and, with Muhammad II of Granada, agrees to a truce with Alfonso X of Castile for two years.
- Later. The Llibre dels fets, a chronicle of the reign of James I of Aragon, is written.
- 27 July. James I of Aragon dies and is succeeded by his son Peter III of Aragon.

1277

- August. Abu Yusuf Yaqub begins his second Invasion of Spain, ravaging the districts of Jerez de la Frontera, Seville and Córdoba.
- Approximate. The Estoire d'Eracles, a history of the Crusades, is written.

1278

- 25 July. Castile defeated by the Marinids at the naval Battle off Algeciras.
- 5 August. Alfonso X of Castile launches the unsuccessful first Siege of Algeciras. Castilian forces were commanded by Peter of Castile and Alfonso Fernández el Niño.

1279

- 16 February. Alfonso III of Portugal dies and is succeeded by his son Denis of Portugal.

=== 1280 ===
- 23 June. Granada defeats Castile and León at the Battle of Moclín. The battle pitted Muhammad II of Granada against mercenaries and the Order of Santiago, commanded by Grand Master Gonzalo Ruiz Girón and Sancho IV of Castile.

1282

- 30 August. Peter III of Aragon lands in Sicily, claims crown four days later and is excommunicated by Pope Martin IV.
- (Date unknown). Roger of Lauria named commander of the Aragonese fleet.

1283

- 13 January. Martin IV declares the Aragonese Crusade against Peter III of Aragon.
- 8 July 1283, Roger of Lauria defeats the Angevins at the Battle of Malta.

1284

- 4 April. Alfonso X of Castile dies and is succeeded by his son Sancho IV of Castile.
- 5 June. Roger of Lauria defeats the Neapolitan fleet at the Battle of the Gulf of Naples, capturing the commander Charles II of Naples.
- 16 August. Joan I of Navarre marries Philip IV of France, and thus Navarre forms a personal union with the Kingdom of France.

1285

- 26 June. Philip III of France invades Aragon in response to the call for the Aragonese Crusade of 1283.
- 4 September. Argonese fleet commanded by Roger of Lauria defeats a French and Genoese at the Battle of Les Formigues.
- 1 October. Aragonese defeat the French at the Battle of the Col de Panissars.
- 5 October. Joan I of Navarre becomes queen consort of France by virtue of her marriage to Philip IV of France. Navarre goes under French rule.
- 2 November. Alfonso III of Aragon (the Liberal) becomes king.

1286

- March. Abu Yaqub Yusuf an-Nasr becomes Marinid sultan of Morocco upon the death of his father.

1287

- 23 June. Aragon defeats Naples at the naval Battle of the Counts.

1288

- 28 October. Edward I of England enters into the Treaty of Canfranc with Alfonso III of Aragon to secure the release of Charles II of Naples, captured four years before.

=== 1291 ===
- 18 June. Alfonso III of Aragon dies and is succeeded by his brother James II of Aragon.
- 6 August. Genoese-Sevillian fleet led by Benedetto Zaccaria wins a victory over Marinid fleet at Alcácer Seguir.
- Approximate. The annals of the Crusades Annales de Terre Sainte is written.

1292

- (Date unknown). The Conquest of Tarifa by Sancho IV of Castile is the first engagement of the Battle of the Strait, and Guzmán el Bueno is later appointed governor.

1295

- 25 April. Ferdinand IV of Castile becomes king.
- Late. The Kingdom of Castile is defeated by the forces of Muhammad II of Granada at the Battle of Iznalloz. Castilian forces were led by Sancho IV of Castile and Ruy Pérez Ponce de León.

1299

- May. The Kingdom of Tlemcen suffered the eight-year Siege of Tlemcen by Abu Yaqub Yusuf an-Nasr. Tlemcen was defended by Abu Said Uthman I and Abu Zayyan I and the siege was lifted upon the assassination of Abu Yaqub Yusuf an-Nasr.
- 4 July. Aragonese-Angevin fleet led by Roger of Lauria defeats a Sicilian fleet at the Battle of Cape Orlando.

== 14th century ==
=== 1300 ===
- February. Boniface VIII announces first Jubilee Year in Rome, promotes a crusade.

1302

- 8 April. Muhammad III of Granada becomes ruler of the Emirate of Granada after the death of his father Muhammad II.
- 31 August. The Peace of Caltabelotta recognizes Aragon's suzerinity over Sicily.

1304

- 8 August. The Treaty of Torrellas settles the question of conquest of the Kingdom of Murcia by James II of Aragon.

1305

- 19 May. The Treaty of Elche is signed, revising the borders set by the Treaty of Torrellas.
- (Date unknown). Majorcan Christian apologist Ramon Lull proposes Oriental languages be taught in the West, presents Liber de Fine to James II of Aragon proposing new crusades against the Muslims.

1307

- 13 May. Marinid sultan of Morocco Abu Yaqub Yusuf an-Nasr is assassinated and succeeded by Abu Thabit 'Amir.

1308

- 19 December. Castile and Aragon sign the Treaty of Alcalá de Henares, pledging to help each other to achieve a total conquest of Granada and split its territories between them.

1309

- 14 March. Nasr of Granada becomes sultan.
- Spring. Pope Clement V authorizes a Castilian and Aragonese crusade against the Moors in Spain.
- 29 April. Clement V issues the papal bull Prioribus decanis allowing Ferdinand IV of Castile to finance the war against Granada.
- 21 July. Aragon defeats Granada at the first Battle of Ceuta.
- 27 July. The second Siege of Algeciras launched by Ferdinand IV against Nasr of Granada. Castile is defeated in January 1310.
- 11 August. The Siege of Almeria launched by James II of Aragon against Granada fails after a Granadan relief column under Uthman ibn Abi al-Ula arrived in September.
- 15 August. The first Siege of Gibraltar is launched, resulting in a Castilian victory. Castilian forces were led by Juan Núñez II de Lara, Alonso Pérez de Guzmán, Fernando Gutiérrez Tello, Garci López de Padilla and John of Castile.

=== 1310 ===
- 23 November. Abu Sa'id Uthman II becomes sultan of Morocco upon the death of his nephew Abu al-Rabi Sulayman.

1312

- 7 September. Alfonso XI of Castile becomes king.
- (Date unknown). Ibn Idhāri writes the Al-Bayan al-Mughrib (Book of the Amazing Story of the History of the Kings of al-Andalus and Maghreb).

1314

- February. Nasr of Granada is forced to abdicate and Ismail I of Granada becomes sultan. Nasr declares himself ruler of Guadix and begins his rebellion.
- Approximate. The history of the Crusades known as the Gestes des Chiprois is written.

1315

- (Date unknown).The Great famine of 1315–1317 devastates Europe.

1316

- 22 February. Ferdinand of Majorca, claimant to the Principality of Achaea, defeats forces of Matilda of Hainaut at the Battle of Picotin.
- (Date unknown). Ismail I of Granada is unsuccessful in the second Siege of Gibraltar, leaving the city in the hand of Castile.

1317

- 10 June. The Order of Montesa, remnants of the Knights Templar in Aragon and Valencia, is approved to defend against the Moors and pirates.

1319

- 14 March. Denis of Portugal revives the Templars of Tomar as the Military Order of Christ and is recognized by Pope John XXII in the papal bull Ad ea ex quibus.
- 25 June. Castile decisively defeated by Ismail I of Granada at the Battle of Sierra Elvira (also known as the Battle of the Vega of Granada).

=== 1320 ===
- June. Peasants in Normandy begin the Shepherds' Crusade to expel assist the Reconquista, and is crushed by royal forces.

1321

- 21 June. Leper's plot, a conspiracy theory that lepers and Muslims were conspiring to poison water in France, results in lepers and Jews being burned at the stake.

1322

- 13 November. Nasr of Granada dies, ending his rebellion.

1325

- 7 January. Afonso IV of Portugal becomes king upon the death of his father Denis I.
- 8 July. Ismail I of Granada is murdered and is succeeded by his son Muhammad IV of Granada.

1327

- 2 November. Alfonso IV of Aragon becomes king.

1328

- (Date unknown). Crusading is revived in Spain by John XXII.

=== 1330 ===
- August. Alfonso XI of Castile defeats Muhammed IV of Granada and Uthman ibn Abi al-Ula at the Battle of Teba. Castilian commanders included Galician Pedro Fernández de Castro and Scot James Douglas.
- August. James Douglas is killed at Teba while carrying the heart of Robert the Bruce to the Holy Land.

1333

- February–June. Muhammed IV successfully captures Gibraltar from the Castilians after the third Siege of Gibraltar.
- 26 June – 24 August. The fourth Siege of Gibraltar, a counterattack by Castile, is repelled by the Granadans under Abu Malik Abd al-Wahid.
- 25 August. Yusuf I of Granada becomes sultan after the assassination of his brother Muhammed IV.

1335

- (Date unknown). The Siege of Tlemcen leads to the annexation of the Zayyanid Kingdom to the Marinids in 1337. The siege was led by sultan Abu al-Hasan Ali ibn Othman and the city was defended by Abu Tashufin I who died in battle along with three of his sons.

1336

- 24 January. Peter IV of Aragon becomes king.

1339

- 6 September. A fleet of Alfonso XI of Castile defeats that of the Marinids and Geneose at the second Battle of Ceuta.
- 28 October. Forces of Alfonso XI of Castile defeat those of Marinid sultan Abu al-Hasan 'Ali at the Battle of Vega de Pagana. The conflict is extended to 1340 at Río Salado near Tarifa.

=== 1340 ===
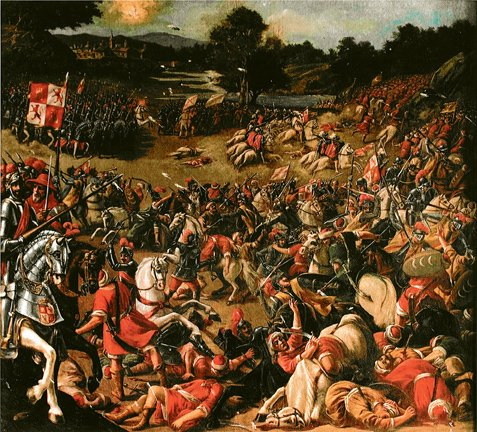
The Battle of Río Salado, 1340.

- 30 October. Afonso IV of Portugal and Alfonso XI of Castile defeat Abu al-Hasan 'Ali and Yusuf I of Granada at the Battle of Río Salado. They were supported by Juan Manuel of Villena and Garci Lasso de la Vega II. The essentially ending the ability of the Marinids to conduct operations in Iberia.

1342

- 8 April. The Kingdom of Castile and the Kingdom of Portugal defeat the Marinid Sultanate at the naval Battle of Guadalmesí.
- 3 August. Alfonso XI of Castile begins the third Siege of Algeciras to capture the capital and the main port of the European territory of the Marinid Empire.
- (Date unknown). Aragon routs the Marinid fleet at the Battle of Estepona.

1344

- 25 March. Algeciras surrenders to Alfonso XI, with Gibraltar remaining in Muslim hands.
- (Date unknown). Peter IV of Aragon annexes Majorca, deposing James III of Majorca.

1349

- 24 August. Alfonso XI of Castile attempts to take Gibraltar with the fifth Siege of Gibraltar.

=== 1350 ===
- 26 March. Alfonso XI of Castile dies of bubonic plague and the Siege of Gibraltar is abandoned shortly thereafter. Peter the Cruel of becomes king.

1351

- (Date unknown). The Castilian Civil War begins, a succession crisis between Peter the Cruel and his half-brother Henry of Trastámara (Henry II of Castile). Peter is supported by Edward the Black Prince and Henry by Bertrand du Guesclin. Part of the Hundred Years' War, it was not resolved until 1366.

1354

- 19 October. Muhammad V of Granada becomes sultan, beginning the Golden Age of Nasrid rule.

1356

- (Date unknown). The War of the Two Pedros begins, a struggle between two claimants to the throne of Castile, Peter of Castile and Peter IV of Aragon.

1357

- 28 May. Peter I of Portugal becomes king after the death of his father Afonso IV.

1359

- 23 August. Ismail II of Granada overthrows his uncle Muhammed V to become sultan of Granada.
- (Date unknown). The Chronicle of San Juan de la Peña written at the behest of Peter IV of Aragon.

=== 1360 ===
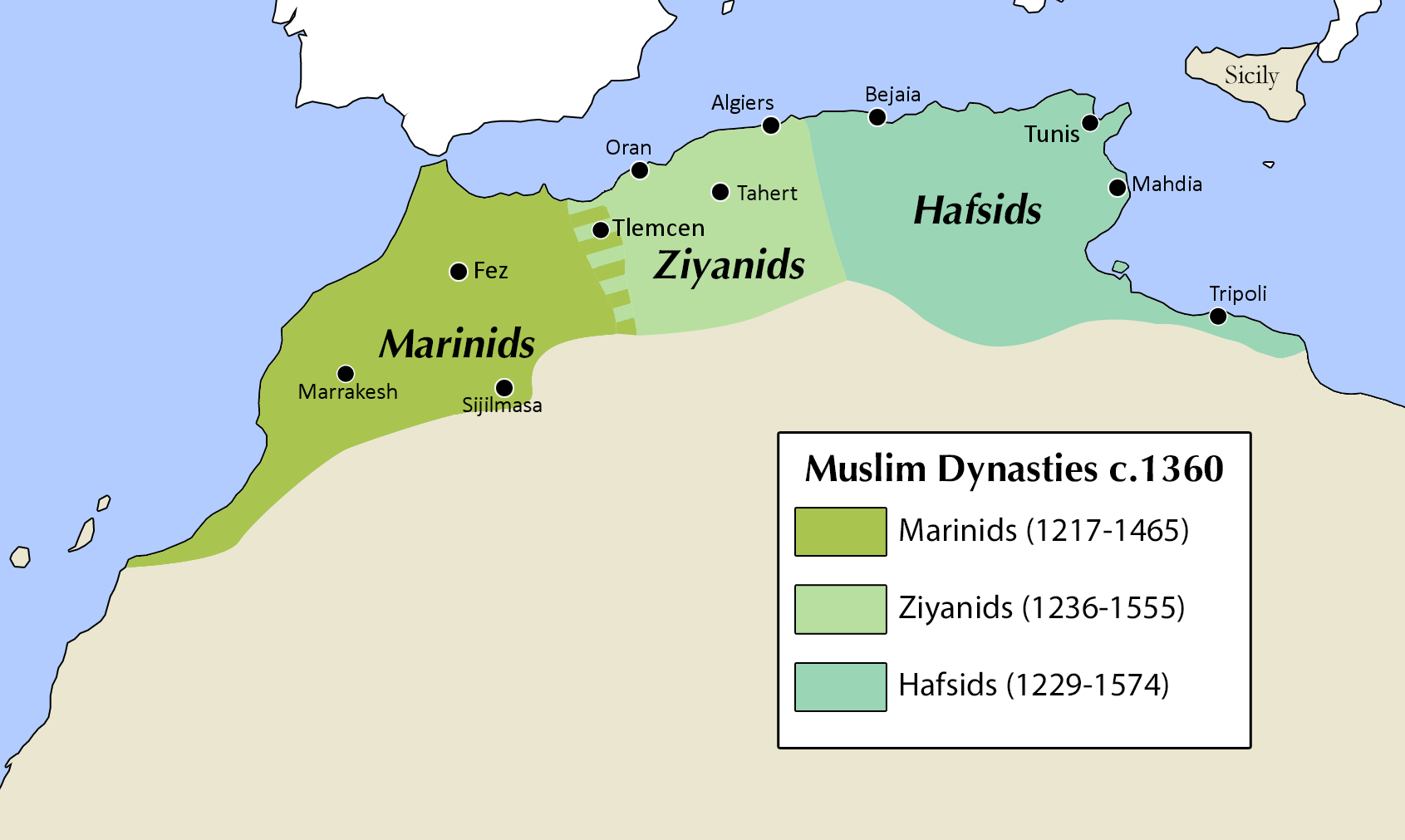
The Marinid Sultanate circa 1360.

- June/July. Muhammad VI of Granada becomes sultan.
- (Date unknown). The anonymous Castilian cantar de gesta, Mocedades de Rodrigo, is composed, relating the origins and exploits of the youth of El Cid.

1361

- 21 December. Castile forces under Diego García de Padilla and Enrique Enríquez el Mozo defeat those of Granada at the Battle of Linuesa.

1362

- January. Castilians are routed by the forces of Muhammed VI of Granada at the Battle of Guadix.
- 13 April. Muhammad VI flees Granada, is murdered by the orders of Peter of Castile two weeks later.
- Later. Muhammad V of Granada begins his second reign.

1366

- 13 March. Henry of Trastámara is procalimed king of Castile.
- 27 August. As part of the Savoyard crusade, Amadeus VI of Savoy, the Green Count, briefly captures Gallipoli.

1367

- 18 January. Ferdinand I of Portugal becomes king.
- 3 April. Peter of Castile is victorious at Battle of Nájera over Henry of Trastámara and Edward the Black Prince.

1369

- 14 March. Henry of Trastámara defeats his half-brother Peter of Castile at the Battle of Montiel, ending the Castilian Civil War.
- Shortly thereafter. Ferdinand I of Portugal begins the first of the Fernadine Wars against Castile.
- 28 July. Granada launches the fourth Siege of Algeciras, retaking the city on 30 July.

=== 1375 ===
- (Date unknown). Majorcan cartographer Abraham Cresques creates the Catalan Atlas.

Catalan Atlas, by the sefardi Cresques Abraham

1377

- (Date unknown). Achaea comes under the control of the Hospitallers under Grand Master Juan Fernández de Heredia. Leasing the principality from Joanna of Naples and Otto of Brunswick, the lease is abandoned in 1381.

1379

- 29 May. John I of Castile becomes king.
- Later. John I forms the Order of the Dove to defend the Catholic faith and the Kingdom of Castile.
- Approximate. The Gran Crónica de Alfonso XI is written.

=== 1381 ===
- (Date unknown). The Third Ferandine War begins, pitting Portugal and England against Castile. The Portuguese forces were led by João Afonso Telo and supported by John of Gaunt, and they faced Fernando Sánchez de Tovar representing Castile.

1382

- 10 August. The Treaty of Elvas is signed, ending the Third Ferandine War.

1383

- 2 April. The Treaty of Elvas is supplemented and clarified in the Treaty of Salvaterra.
- 17 May. Beatrice of Portugal marries John I of Castile.
- 22 October. The death of Ferdinand I of Portugal results in the Portuguese Interregnum.
- December. John I of Castile begins the Invasion of Portugal.

1384

- (Date unknown). Antipope Clement VII proclaims a crusade in support of John I of Castile's invasion of Portugal.
- 6 April. The Portuguese under Nuno Álvares Pereira defeat the Castilians under Fernando Sánchez de Tovar and Pedro Álvares Pereira at the Battle of Atoleiros.

1385

- 6 April. John I of Portugal becomes king.
- August. The Portuguese under Nuno Álvares Pereira defeat the Castilians under Pedro Álvares Pereira at the Battle of Aljubarrota, ending the 1383–1385 Crisis (Portuguese interregnum).

1386

- 29 July. John of Gaunt leads a crusade against Henry of Trastámara to claim the throne of Castile by right of his wife Constance of Castile.

1387

- 6 January. John I of Aragon becomes king.

=== 1390 ===
- 1 July. Louis II de Bourbon leads the Mahdia Crusade against Barbary pirates in Tunisia.
- 9 October. Henry III of Castile becomes king.

1391

- 15 January. Yusuf II of Granada becomes sultan.
- 6 June. The Pogroms of 1391 against Jews in Spain begin.

1392

- 3 October. Muhammad VII of Granada succeeds Yusuf II as Nasrid sultan of Granada.
- December. Nasrids conduct a Raid on Murcia, threatening the truce with Castile.

1394

- 26 April. Muhammad VII of Granada defeats the Castilians at the Battle of Puerto Lope.

1396

- 19 May. Martin of Aragon becomes king.

1398

- (Date unknown). Crusade of Tedelis between Martin of Aragon and the Kingdom of Tlemcen is inconclusive.

== 15th century ==
=== 1406 ===
- (Date unknown). Forces commanded by Henry III of Castile defeat Muhammad VII of Granada at the Battle of Collejares.
- 25 December. John II of Castile becomes king after the death of his father Henry III.

1407

- 5–25 October. The Castilians fail in their Siege of Setenil.

1408

- 13 May. Yusuf III of Granada become sultan.

1409

- (Date unknown). John I of Portugal plans the invasion of Ceuta, supported by Edward the Eloquent and Henry the Navigator.
- (Date unknown). Henry of Aragon becomes Grand Master of the Order of Santiago.

=== 1410 ===
- 16 September. Ferdinand I of Aragon takes the city in the Battle of Antequera, the first such victory against the Muslims in fifty years.
- (Date unknown). Álvaro de Luna becomes key advisor to John II of Castile.

1411

- (Date unknown). The sixth Siege of Gibraltar leaves the territory under Granadan control.

1412

- 3 September. Ferdinand I of Aragon becomes king.

1415

- 21 August. John I of Portugal completes the Conquest of Ceuta, beginning the series of Moroccan–Portuguese conflicts.

1416

- 2 April. Alfonso V of Aragon becomes king.

1417

- (Date unknown). Muhammad VIII of Granada becomes sultan (first reign).

1418

- (Date unknown). Pope Martin V authorizes of a crusade against Africa to combat the slave trade.

1419

- 13 August. Marinid sultan Abu Said Uthman III launches the unsuccessful Siege of Ceuta to recapture the city from the Portuguese who were led by Pedro de Menezes.
- (Date unknown). Muhammad IX of Granada begins his first reign as sultan.

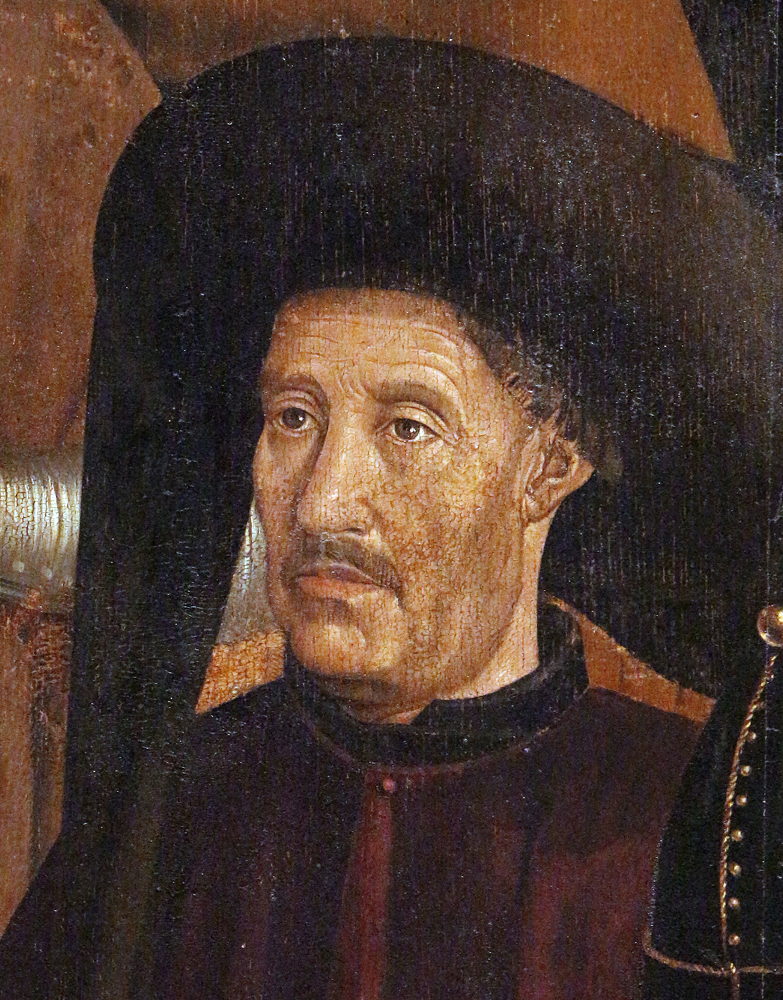
Henry the Navigator as shown in the Saint Vincent Panels by Nuno Gonçalves. (Note: This traditional image of Henry the Navigator presented in the Saint Vincent Panels remains under dispute.)

=== 1420 ===
- 25 May. Henry the Navigator is appointed Grand Master of the Military Order of Christ.

1427

- (Date unknown). Muhammad VIII of Granada becomes sultan (second reign).

1429

- (Date unknown).The Hafsids under Kaid Ridavan mount the Siege of Malta, then withdraw.
- (Date unknown). Muhammad IX of Granada begins his second reign as sultan.

=== 1430 ===
- 10 January. Philip the Good founds the Order of the Golden Fleece.

1431

- 1 July. Castilian forces led by Álvaro de Luna defeat Granada at the Battle of La Higueruela.

1432

- 1 January. Yusuf IV of Granada briefly becomes sultan.
- Later. Muhammad IX of Granada begins his third reign as sultan.

1433

- 14 August. Edward of Portugal becomes king after the death of his father John of Aviz.

1434

- (Date unknown). The Granadans defeat the Order of Alcántara at the Battle of Archidona.

1435

- 5 August. Filippo Visconti dispatches the Genoese navy under Biagio Assereto and decisively defeats Aragon at the naval Battle of Ponza. Alfonso V of Aragon, John II of Aragon and Henry of Aragon were captured and later released.

1436

- 31 October. Castilian Enrique Pérez de Guzmán fails to capture the stronghold after the seventh Siege of Gibraltar, drowning during the siege.

1437

- 13 August. The Castilian Civil War begins, pitting John II of Castile, Álvaro de Luna and Henry IV of Castile against John II of Aragon and Henry of Aragon.
- 8 September. Pope Eugenius IV issues the bull Rex Regnum blessing the Tangier enterprise with crusade privileges.
- 13 September – 19 October. Henry the Navigator is defeated by the Marinids at the Battle of Tangier. The son of John I of Portugal, infante Ferdinand the Saint Prince, is taken captive.

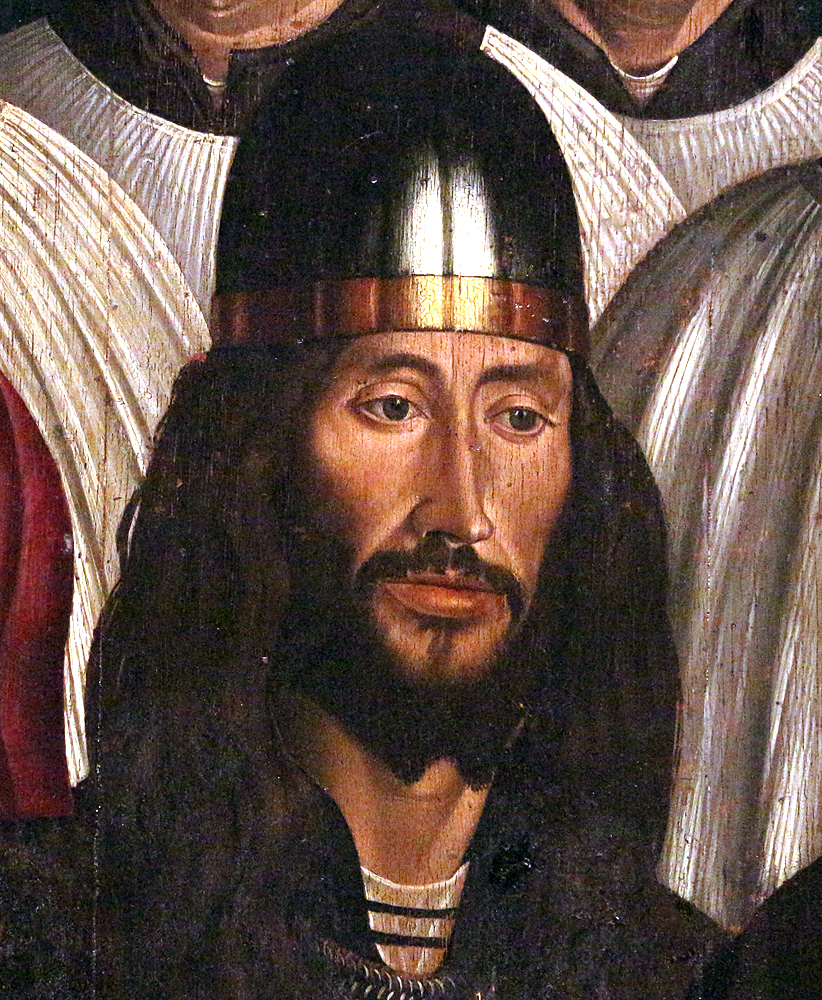
Detail from the Saint Vincent Panels by Nuno Gonçalves believed to be a portrait of Ferdinand the Saint Prince.

1438

- 28 July. The Grandans defeat the Castilians at the Battle of Castril.
- 13 September. Alfonso the African becomes king of Portugal after the death of his father Edward of Portugal.

=== 1443 ===
- 5 June. Ferdinand the Saint Prince dies in captivity in Fez.

1445

- 19 May. John II of Aragon is defeated by John II of Castile at the First Battle of Olmedo, ending the Castilian Civil War.
- (Date unknown) Álvaro de Luna becomes Grand Master of the Order of Santiago.

1448

- 17 March. The Granadans defeat the Castilians at the Battle of Río Verde.
- (Date unknown). Muhammad IX of Granada begins his last reign as sultan.
- Later. The Granadans defeat the Castilians at the Battle of Hellín.

1449

- 20 May. Afonso V of Portugal and Afonso of Braganza suppress the rebellion of Peter of Coimbra at the Battle of Alfarrobeira. Peter died in this battle.

=== 1450 ===
- (Date unknown). Nuno Gonçalves is appointed court painter of Afonso V of Portugal and later paints the Saint Vincent Panels.

1452

- 17 March. Castile and Murcia defeat Granada at the Battle of Los Alporchones.

1454

- 22 July. Henry IV of Castile becomes king.

1455

- 8 January. Pope Nicholas V publishes Romanus Pontifex, an encyclical to Afonso V of Portugal sanctioning slavery.

A map of Iberia ca. 1462

1458

- 27 June. John II of Aragon becomes king.
- 23 October. Afonso the African completes the Portuguese conquest of Ksar es-Seghir.

=== 1462 ===
- (Date unknown). Castilians capture the city after the eighth Siege of Gibraltar. Castilian forces were led by Juan Alonso de Guzmán, Alonso de Arcos and Rodrigo de Arcos.

1465

- 14 August. Marinid sultan Abd al-Haqq II is murdered in the Moroccan revolution, leaving much of the country under the rule of the Wattasid dynasty.

1466

- (Date unknown). Juan Alonso de Guzmán takes the city from Castile in the ninth Siege of Gibraltar.

1467

- 20 August. Henry IV of Castile defeats his half-brother Alfonso of Asturias at the Second Battle of Olmedo.

1468

- (Date unknown). Portuguese fleet commanded by Fernando of Viseu razes a region of Morocco in the Anfa Expedition.

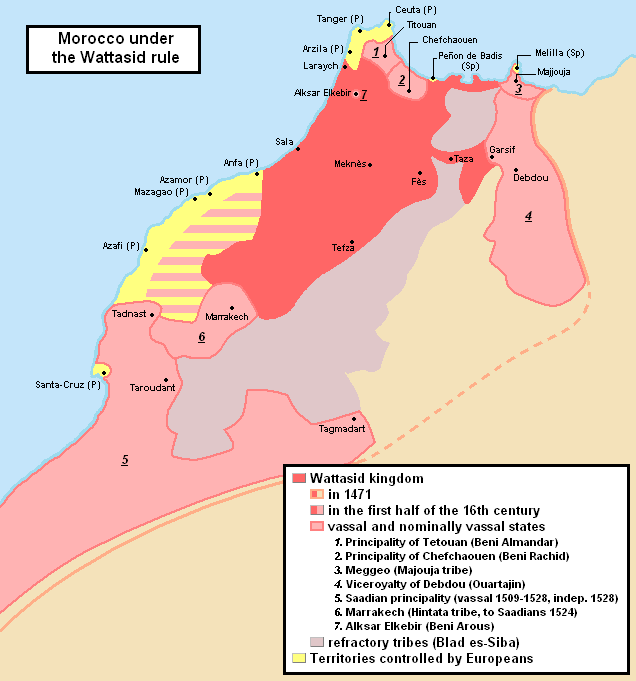
Morocco in the late 15th and 16th centuries.

1469

- 19 October. Ferdinand II of Aragon marries Isabella I of Castile.

=== 1471 ===
- 24 August. Portugal defeats Kingdom of Fez resulting in the Conquest of Asilah.
- 29 August. Portugal occupies Tangier.

1472

- (Date unknown). Wattasid dynasty under Abu Abd Allah al-Sheikh Muhammad is founded in Fez following the chaos left by the Moroccan revolution.

1474

- 11 December. Isabella I of Castile becomes queen after the death of her father Henry IV.
- 12 December. Henry IV's death triggers a civil war between Isabella I and her niece Joanna la Beltraneja.

1475

- (Date unknown). War of the Castilian Succession begins with the Siege of Burgos.

1476

- 1 March. The Catholic Monarchs defeat Afonso V of Portugal and John II of Portugal at the Battle of Toro.

1478

- Spring or Summer. A Portuguese fleet defeats a Castilian fleet at the Battle of Guinea. This was part of the War of the Castilian Succession.
- 1 November. The Spanish Inquisition begins.

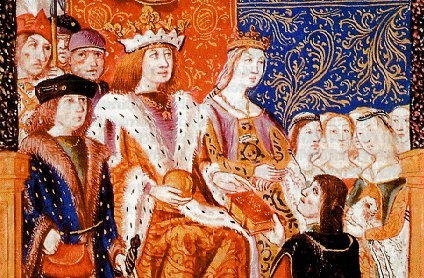
Ferdinand and Isabella with their subjects

1479

- 20 January. Ferdinand II of Aragon becomes king and rules together with his wife Isabella I of Castile over Iberia.
- 4 September. War of the Castilian Succession ends with the signing of the Treaty of Alcáçovas.

=== 1481 ===
- 21 June. Sixtus IV issues the bull Aeterni regis confirming the Treaty of Alcáçovas.
- 28 August. John II of Portugal becomes king.

1482

- 28 February. Alhama de Granada is taken by Christian forces, starting the Granada War.
- (Date unknown). Muhammad XI of Granada, known as Boabdil, begins his first reign as sultan.

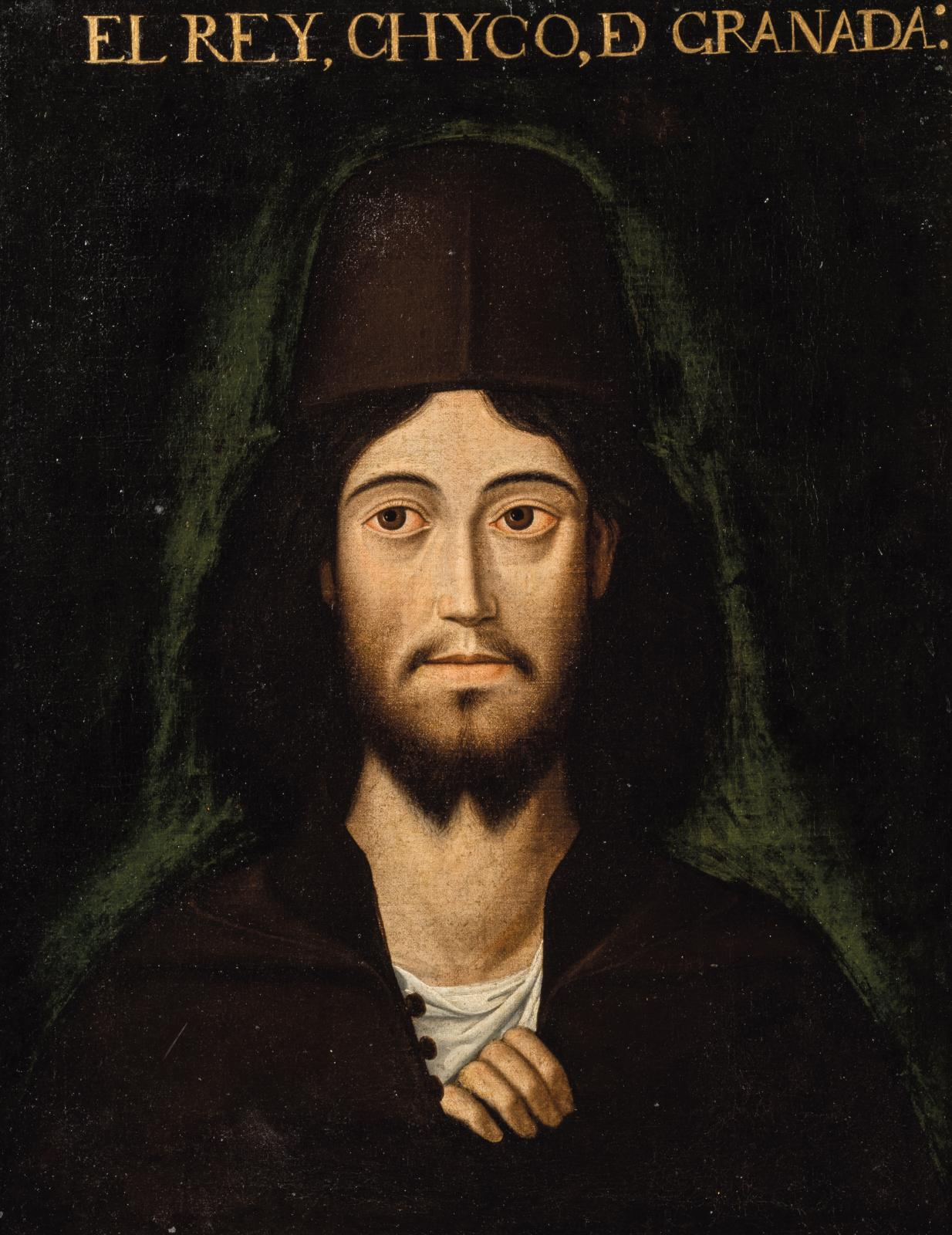
Portrait of Muhammad XI of Granada, 17th century, private collection.

1483

- April. Castile defeats Granada at the Battle of Lucena. Christian forces take Muhammad XI of Granada as prisoner.

1484

- 5 December. Pope Innocent VIII issues the bull Summis desiderantes affectibus giving the inquisition a mission to hunt heretics and witches.

1487

- Early. Muhammad XI of Granada, the last Nasrid ruler of the Emirate of Granada, is released in exchange for placing Granada as a tributary to the Catholic monarchy.
- 7 May – 18 August. Spain conquers the city after the 103-day Siege of Málaga following earlier attacks on Ronda and Vélez-Málaga.
- August. Portugal pillages the Anfa region (Casablanca) of Morocco in the Chaouia Expedition.

1489

- (Date unknown). Al-Zadal (Muhammad XII of Granada) surrenders the city to Spain after the six-month Siege of Baza and is captured.

=== 1490 ===
- (Date unknown). Portugal ravages Moroccan pirate havens in the Sack of Targa and Comice.

1491

- 23 April. Spain begins the Siege of Granada, the final battle of the Reconquisa.
- 25 November. Treaty of Granada signed, granting the Nasrids two months to withdraw from the city.

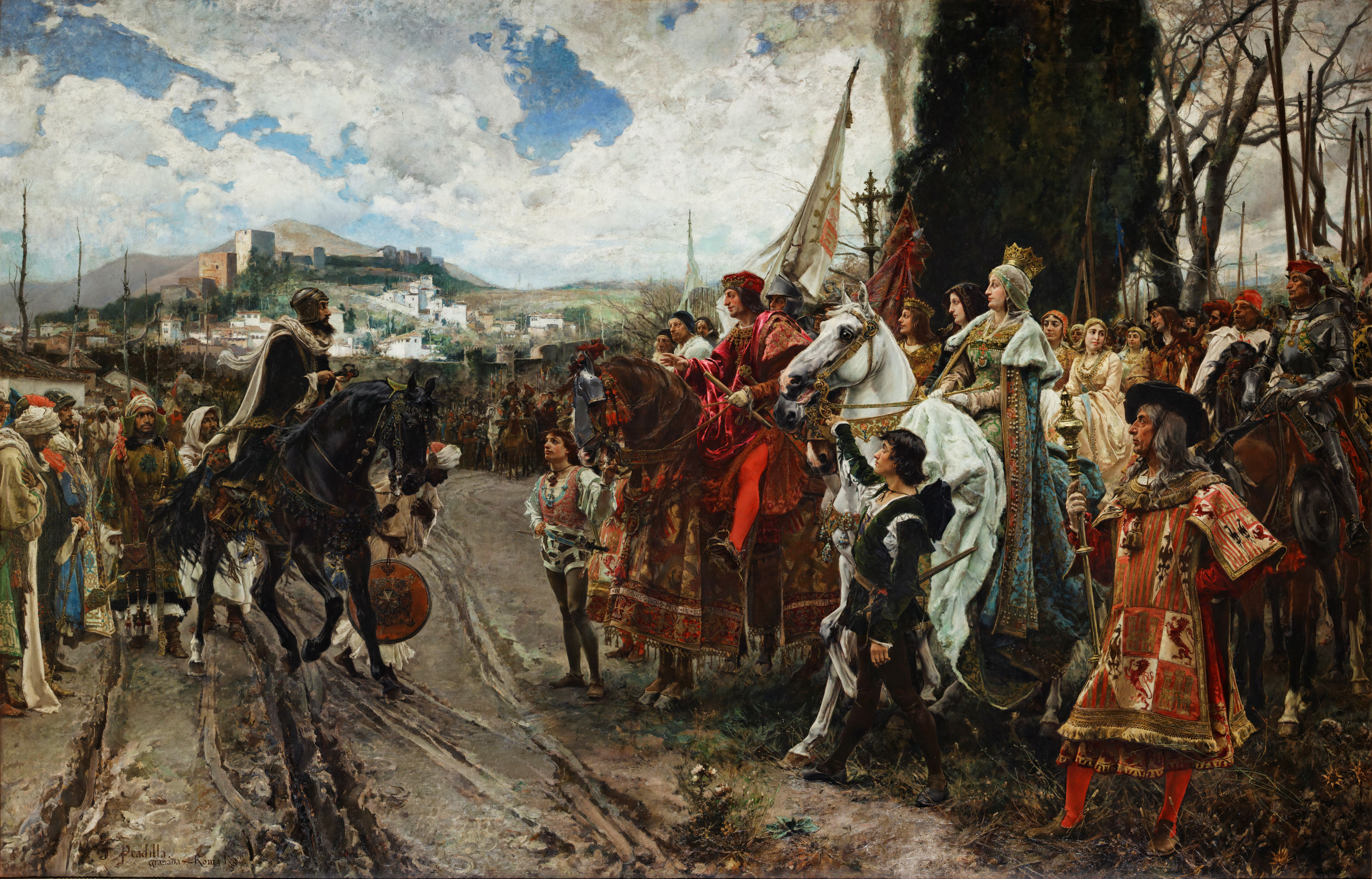
La rendición de Granada by Francisco Pradilla Ortiz. Muhammad XI surrenders to Ferdinand and Isabella.

1492

- 2 January. Muhammad XI, the last emir of Granada, surrenders his city to the army of the Catholic Monarchs after a lengthy siege, ending the ten-year Granada War and the centuries-long Reconquista, and bringing an end to 780 years of Muslim control in Al-Andalus.
- 6 January. Ferdinand and Isabella enter Granada.
- 31 March. Ferdinand and Isabella sign the Alhambra Decree, expelling all Jews from Spain unless they convert to Christianity.
- 2 August. Ottoman sultan Bayezid II dispatches the Ottoman Navy to bring expelled Spanish Jews safely to Ottoman lands.

== Aftermath ==
The Fall of Granada ended the Reconquista, but some residual events continued.

- 12 October 1492. Christopher Columbus makes landfall in the Caribbean, believing he has reached the East Indies.
- 4 May 1493. Pope Alexander VI issues the bull Inter caetera granting newly discovered lands to Spain. Dudum siquidem clarifies this on 26 September.
- 17 September 1497. The Conquest of Melilla was done by a fleet sent by the Juan Alonso Pérez de Guzmán which attacked the North African city of Melilla.
- 18 December 1499. Spanish Muslims begin the first Rebellion of the Alpujarras.
- 11 April 1501. Rebellion of the Alpujarras is squashed.
- 17 September 1502. Forced conversion of Muslims begins in the Crown of Castile by edict of Isabella I.
- 24 December 1568. The second Rebellion of the Alpujarras is resolved after three years.

== See also ==
- Portugal in the Reconquista
- Timeline of the Muslim presence in the Iberian Peninsula

== Bibliography ==
- Atiya, Aziz Suryal (1938). The Crusade in the Later Middle Ages. Methuen. ISBN 978-0-5270-3700-0.
- Bariani, Laura (2003). Almanzor. Nerea. ISBN 978-8-4895-6985-0.
- Barton, Simon (2002). The Aristocracy in Twelfth-Century León and Castile. Cambridge University Press. ISBN 978-0-5218-9406-7.
- Beazley, Raymond (1923). Prince Henry the Navigator. New York, G. P. Putnam's sons.
- Berend, Nora (2025). El Cid - The Life and Afterlife of a Medieval Mercenary. New York: Pegasus Books, Inc. ISBN 978-1-63936-646-0.
- Berry, Virginia G. (1969). "The Second Crusade" ( (PDF)). In Setton, Kenneth M.; Baldwin, Marshall W. (eds.). The First Hundred Years. A History of the Crusades. University of Wisconsin Press. pp. 463–512. ISBN 978-0-2990-4834-1. Archived from the original on 26 March 2023.
- Bishko, Charles J. (1975). "The Spanish and Portuguese Reconquest, 1095–1492" ( (PDF)). In Hazard, Harry W. (ed.). The Fourteenth and Fifteenth Centuries. Setton, Kenneth M. (ed.), A History of the Crusades, University of Wisconsin Press. pp. 396–456. ISBN 978-0-2990-6674-1. Archived from the original on 11 December 2022.
- Bisson, Thomas N. (2011). The Medieval Crown of Aragon: A Short History. Clarendon Press. ISBN 978-0-1916-7529-4.
- Bosworth, Clifford Edmund (2004). The New Islamic dynasties: A Chronological and Genealogical Manual. Edinburgh University Press. ISBN 978-0-7486-2137-8.
- Burton, Keith Augustus (2007). The Blessing of Africa: The Bible and African Christianity. InterVarsity Press. ISBN 978-0-8308-2762-6.
- Chaytor, Henry John (1933). A History of Aragon and Catalonia. Methuen & Company, Limited. ISBN 978-0-4040-1479-7.
- Collins, Roger (1983). Early Medieval Spain: Unity in Diversity, 400–1000. St. Martin's Press. ISBN 978-0-3122-2464-6.
- Collins, Roger (1989). The Arab Conquest of Spain, 710–797. Wiley. ISBN 978-0-6311-9405-7.
- Collins, Roger (1990). The Basques. Basil Blackwell. ISBN 978-0-6311-7565-0.
- Collins, Roger (2008). Visigothic Spain, 409–711. Wiley. ISBN 978-0-4707-5456-6.
- Collins, Roger (2012). Caliphs and Kings: Spain, 796-1031. Wiley. ISBN 978-0-6311-8184-2.
- Coppée, Henry (1881). History of the Conquest of Spain by the Arab-Moors. Little, Brown.
- Díez, Gonzalo Martínez (2005). El Condado de Castilla, 711–1038. Marcial Pons. ISBN 978-8-4953-7994-8.
- Diffie, Bailey Wallys (1977). Foundations of the Portuguese Empire, 1415–1580. University of Minnesota Press. ISBN 978-0-8166-0850-8.
- Dozy, Anne; Pieter, Reinhart (1913). Spanish Islam: A History of Muslims in Spain. Chatto & Windus.
- Drees, Clayton (2000). The Late Medieval Age of Crisis and Renewal, 1300–1500: A Biographical Dictionary. Bloomsbury. ISBN 978-1-5675-0749-2.
- Erdmann, Carl (1977). The Origin of the Idea of Crusade. Translated by Baldwin, Marshall W.; Goffart, Walter. Princeton University Press. ISBN 978-1-5974-0798-4.
- Evans, Austin P. (1969). "The Albigensian Crusade" ( (PDF)). In Wolff, Robert L.; Hazard, Harry W. (eds.). The Later Crusades, 1189–1311. Setton, Kenneth M. (ed.), A History of the Crusades, University of Wisconsin Press. pp. 277–324. ISBN 978-0-2990-4844-0. Archived from the original on 19 February 2015.
- Fierro, María Isabel (2005). Abd Al-Rahman III: The First Cordoban Caliph. Oneworld Publications. ISBN 978-1-8516-8384-0.
- Fletcher, Richard A. (1991). The Quest for El Cid. Oxford University Press. ISBN 978-0-1950-6955-6.
- Fletcher, Richard A.; Barton, Simon (2000). The World of El Cid: Chronicles of the Spanish Reconquest. Manchester University Press. ISBN 978-0-7190-5226-2.
- Fouracre, Paul (2000). The Age of Charles Martel. Longman. ISBN 978-0-5820-6475-1.
- Gerli, E. Michael (2017). Medieval Iberia: An Encyclopedia. Taylor & Francis. ISBN 978-1-3516-6578-0.
- Halsall, Guy (2003). Warfare and Society in the Barbarian West, 450–900. Routledge. ISBN 978-0-4152-3940-0.
- Hannay, David (1911a). "Alphonso" . In Chisholm, Hugh (ed.). Encyclopædia Britannica. Vol. 1 (11th ed.). Cambridge University Press.
- Hannay, David (1911b). "Peter (Spanish kings)" . In Chisholm, Hugh (ed.). Encyclopædia Britannica. Vol. 21 (11th ed.). Cambridge University Press.
- Harvey, Leonard Patrick (1992). Islamic Spain, 1250 to 1500. University of Chicago Press. ISBN 978-0-2263-1962-9.
- Harvey, Leonard Patrick (2005). Muslims in Spain, 1500–1614. University of Chicago Press. ISBN 978-0-2263-1963-6.
- Hazard, Harry W. (1975). "Moslem North Africa, 1049–1394" ( (PDF)). In Hazard, Harry W. (ed.). The Fourteenth and Fifteenth Centuries. Setton, Kenneth M. (ed.), A History of the Crusades, University of Wisconsin Press. ISBN 978-0-2990-6674-1. Archived from the original on 17 November 2022.
- Hillgarth, J. N. (1978). The Spanish Kingdoms, 1250–1516. Clarendon Press. ISBN 978-0-1982-2531-7.
- Housley, Norman (1982). The Italian Crusades: The Papal-Angevin Alliance and the Crusades against Christian Lay Powers, 1254–1343. Clarendon Press. ISBN 978-0-1982-1925-5.
- Housley, Norman (1992b). "The Iberian Peninsula: The Rewards and Problems with Conquest, 1274–1415". The Later Crusades, 1274–1580: From Lyons to Alcazar. Oxford University Press. pp. 267–290. ISBN 978-0-1982-2136-4.
- Jayne, Kingsley Garland; Prestage, Edgar (1911). "Portugal" . Encyclopædia Britannica. Vol. 22 (11th ed.).
- Kennedy, Hugh N. (2004). The Prophet and the Age of the Caliphates: The Islamic Near East from the Sixth to Eleventh Century. Pearson/Longman. ISBN 978-0-5824-0525-7.
- Kennedy, Hugh N. (2014). Muslim Spain and Portugal: A Political History of Al-Andalus. Taylor & Francis. ISBN 978-1-3178-7040-1.
- Lagardère, Vincent (1989). Les Almoravides jusqu'au règne de Yūsuf B. Tāšfīn (1039-1106). L'Harmattan. ISBN 978-2-7384-0467-1.
- Lardner, Dionysius (1833). History of Spain and Portugal. Philadelphia: Carey & Lea.
- Lewis, Archibald R. (1965). The Development of Southern French and Catalan Society, 718–1050. University of Texas Press.
- Livermore, H. V. (1947). A History of Portugal. Cambridge University Press.
- Lock, Peter (2006). The Routledge Companion to the Crusades. Routledge. doi:10.4324/9780203389638. ISBN 978-0-4153-9312-6.
- Lomax, Derek W. (1978). The Reconquest of Spain. Longman. ISBN 978-0-5825-0209-3.
- McMurdo, Edward (1888). The History of Portugal: From the Commencement of the Monarchy to the Reign of Alfonso III. Harvard University.
- Miller, William (1908). The Latins in the Levant: a history of Frankish Greece 1204-1566. New York: Dutton.
- Murray, Alan V. (2006). The Crusades—An Encyclopedia. ABC-CLIO. ISBN 978-1-5760-7862-4.
- Nervo, Jean Baptiste (1897). Isabella the Catholic, Queen of Spain: Her Life, Reign, and Times, 1451–1504. Smith, Elder, & Co.
- Nicolle, David (1988). El Cid and the Reconquista,1050–1492. Bloomsbury USA. ISBN 978-0-8504-5840-4.
- Nicolle, David (2001). The Moors: The Islamic West, 7th–15th Centuries AD. Bloomsbury USA. ISBN 978-1-8553-2964-5.
- Nicolle, David (2009). The Great Islamic Conquests, AD 632–750. Osprey. ISBN 978-1-4728-9535-6.
- O'Callaghan, Joseph F. (1983). A History of Medieval Spain. Cornell University Press. ISBN 978-0-8014-9264-8.
- O'Callaghan, Joseph F. (2011). The Gibraltar Crusade: Castile and the Battle for the Strait. University of Pennsylvania Press. ISBN 978-0-8122-0463-6.
- O'Callaghan, Joseph F. (2013). Reconquest and Crusade in Medieval Spain. University of Pennsylvania Press. ISBN 978-0-8122-0306-6.
- O'Callaghan, Joseph F. (2014). The Last Crusade in the West: Castile and the Conquest of Granada. University of Pennsylvania Press. ISBN 978-0-8122-0935-8.
- O'Callaghan, Joseph F. (2016). The Learned King: The Reign of Alfonso X of Castile. University of Pennsylvania Press. ISBN 978-1-5128-0545-1.
- Phillips, Jonathan P. (2007). The Second Crusade: Extending the Frontiers of Christendom. Yale University Press. ISBN 978-0-3001-1274-0.
- Prescott, William H. (1844). History of the Reign of Ferdinand and Isabella, the Catholic. Boston: C. C. Little and J. Brown.
- Prescott, William H. (1868). History of the Reign of Ferdinand and Isabella, the Catholic. J.B. Lippincott.
- Reilly, Bernard F. (1982a). The Kingdom of León-Castilla under Queen Urraca, 1109–1126. Princeton University Press. ISBN 978-0-6080-1602-3.
- Reilly, Bernard F. (1982b). The Kingdom of León-Castilla under Queen Urraca, 1109–1126. Princeton University Press. ISBN 978-0-6080-1602-3.
- Reilly, Bernard F. (1988a). The Kingdom of León-Castilla under King Alfonso VI, 1065–1109. Princeton University Press. ISBN 978-0-6910-5515-2.
- Reilly, Bernard F. (1988b). The Kingdom of León-Castilla under King Alfonso VI, 1065–1109. Princeton University Press. ISBN 978-0-6910-5515-2.
- Reilly, Bernard F. (1992). The Contest of Christian and Muslim Spain, 1031–1157. Wiley. ISBN 978-0-6311-9964-9.
- Reilly, Bernard F. (1993). The Medieval Spains. Cambridge University Press. ISBN 978-0-5213-9741-4.
- Reilly, Bernard F. (1998). The Kingdom of León-Castilla under King Alfonso VII, 1126–1157. University of Pennsylvania Press. ISBN 978-0-8122-3452-7.
- Riley-Smith, Jonathan (1997). The First Crusaders, 1095–1131. Cambridge University Press. ISBN 978-0-5216-4603-1.
- Riley-Smith, Jonathan (1998). The Atlas of the Crusades. Facts on File. ISBN 978-0-8160-2186-4.
- Riley-Smith, Jonathan (2001). The Oxford Illustrated History of The Crusades. Oxford University Press. ISBN 978-0-1928-5428-5.
- Rivero, Isabel (1982). Compendio de historia medieval española. Ediciones AKAL. ISBN 978-84-7090-125-6.
- Rogers, Clifford J. (2010a). Oxford Encyclopedia of Medieval Warfare and Military Technology. Oxford University Press. ISBN 978-0-1953-3403-6.
- Rogers, Clifford J. (2010b). Oxford Encyclopedia of Medieval Warfare and Military Technology. Oxford University Press. ISBN 978-0-1953-3403-6.
- Runciman, Steven (1951). A History of the Crusades, Volume One: The First Crusade and the Foundation of the Kingdom of Jerusalem. Cambridge University Press. ISBN 978-0-5213-4770-9.
- Runciman, Steven (1952). A History of the Crusades, Volume Two: The Kingdom of Jerusalem and the Frankish East, 1100–1187. Cambridge University Press. ISBN 978-0-5213-4771-6.
- Runciman, Steven (1954). A History of the Crusades, Volume Three: The Kingdom of Acre and the Later Crusades. Cambridge University Press. ISBN 978-0-5213-4772-3.
- Runciman, Steven (1958). The Sicilian Vespers: A History of the Mediterranean World in the Later Thirteenth Century. Cambridge University Press. ISBN 978-1-1076-0474-2.
- Sayer, Frederick (1865). The history of Gibraltar and of its political relation to events in Europe. London, Chapman and Hall.
- Setton, Kenneth M., ed. (1969–1989). A History of the Crusades. Six Volumes. University of Wisconsin Press.
- Slack, Corliss K. (2013). Historical Dictionary of the Crusades. Scarecrow Press. ISBN 978-0-8108-7830-3.
- Stephens, Frederic G. (1870). A history of Gibraltar and its sieges. Provost.
- Suárez Fernández, Luis (1976). Historia de España antigua y media. Rialp. ISBN 978-8-4321-1884-5.
- Topping, Peter (1975a). The Morea, 1311–1364 (PDF). A History of the Crusades (Setton), Volume III.
- Van Cleve, Thomas C. (1969). "The Fifth Crusade" ( (PDF)). In Wolff, Robert L.; Hazard, Harry W. (eds.). The Later Crusades, 1189–1311. Setton, Kenneth M. (ed.), A History of the Crusades, University of Wisconsin Press. pp. 377–428. ISBN 978-0-2990-4844-0. Archived from the original on 4 January 2023.
- Venning, Timothy; Frankopan, Peter (2015). A Chronology of the Crusades. Taylor & Francis. ISBN 978-1-3174-9643-4.
- Watts, Henry Edward (1894). The Christian Recovery of Spain: Being the Story of Spain from the Moorish Conquest to the Fall of Granada (711-1492 A.D.). New York: G. P. Putnam's Sons.
- Wellhausen, Julius (1927). The Arab Kingdom and Its Fall. Translated by Weir, Margaret Graham. University of Calcutta.
- Wheeler, Benjamin W. (1969). "The Reconquest of Spain before 1095" ( (PDF)). The First Hundred Years. Univ of Wisconsin Press. pp. 31–39. ISBN 978-0-2990-4834-1. Archived from the original on 27 August 2021.
