= Qui iustis causis =

1243 papal bull by Pope Innocent IV

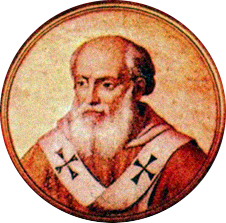
Pope Innocent IV

Qui iustis causis is a papal bull issued by Pope Innocent IV on 23 September 1243 authorising crusades in Livonia and Prussia. Shortly after Innocent's election to the papacy, the Teutonic Order sought his consent for the suppression of the Prussian rebellion and for their struggle against the Lithuanians. It was reissued by Innocent and his successors in October 1243, March 1256, August 1256 and August 1257.

When the bull was re-issued in March 1256, it was sent to Bishop Heidenreich of Chelmno and Bishop Henry of Courland, to support the Dominican's preaching for the Baltic crusade.

== Sources ==
- Fonnesberg-Schmidt, Iben (2007). The Popes and the Baltic Crusades: 1147–1254. Brill.
- Maier, Christoph T. (1994). Preaching the Crusades: Mendicant Friars and the Cross in the Thirteenth Century. Cambridge University Press.
