= John of Perugia and Peter of Sassoferrato =

Italian Roman Catholic saints

Blesseds John of Perugia and Peter of Sassoferrato
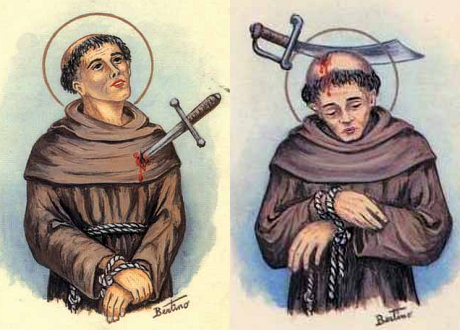

Martyrs
- Died: c.1228 Valencia, Spain
- Venerated in: Roman Catholic Church
- Beatified: 31 January 1705 by Pope Clement XI
- Feast: 3 September
- Attributes: Franciscan habit Swords; Tied to stakes
- Patronage: Teruel

John of Perugia and Peter of Sassoferrato, were both Franciscan friars, who in 1216, were sent by St. Francis, to preach and convert the Moors, at Teruel and Valencia. Both of them would go on to suffer martyrdom in 1231, at Valencia.

== Biographies ==
Giovanni da Perugia, a priest, was one of the first companions of St. Francis. He and Pietro da Sassoferrato, a lay brother, were sent by Saint Francis of Assisi in Spain, according to some chroniclers, in 1217, in the expedition directed by Fra Bernardo di Quintavalle or in 1220, according to others.

According to tradition, the friars first settled in Zaragoza. John and Peter founded a convent of Teruel (1220); they then went to Valencia to exercise their ministry among the Christian slaves. There they stayed in the house of Don Blasco de Alagon, (who later founded Vilafranca). Don Blasco warned them against preaching to the Moors. Nonetheless, inflamed one day with holy zeal, they set about preaching the Gospel in the public square. Imprisoned by the governor Zayd Abu Zayd, and firm in their faith, they were beheaded.

Much debated are the place of martyrdom (probably in the square called Figuera, Higuera, and then Plaza de la Reina) and the date, which traditionally is set at 29 August 1231 and which is anticipated by others to 1227-28. However, there are valid reasons in favor of a date even later than 1228 (and very probably 1221) because Zayd abu Zayd, who - according to legend - then converted through the intercession of the martyrs and gave one of his palaces as a friary to the friars after the Conquest of Valencia (1238), he had been deposed by his opponent Zaen (Abenzeyan) before 1228.

== Veneration ==
The relics of the blessed martyrs, redeemed even before the conquest of Valencia, were placed in the church of the Franciscan convent of Teruel, where they remained until 1835, when they were transferred to the church of S. Chiara, returning in 1900 to the Franciscan convent, re-built.

The cult is to be considered immemorial in Aragon, in Valencia, and above all in Teruel, which honors them as patrons and special protectors against the scourge of locusts. Following the decrees of Urban VIII, apostolic processes were drawn up to obtain formal beatification. Having approved the cult by Clement XI on 31 January 1705, in 1727 Benedict XIII granted the proper office for the city of Teruel, setting the feast of the martyrs to 3 September. The approval was extended to Valencia in 1783.
