= Catalans =

Catalans (Note: Pronunciation: English /ˈkætələnz, -ænz/ KAT-ə-lənz, -lanz or /ˌkætəˈlænz/ KAT-ə-LANZ (Catalans); Catalan [kətəˈlans] or [kataˈlans] (catalans); French [kataˈlɑ̃] (catalans); Occitan [kataˈlans] (catalans); Spanish [kataˈlanes] (catalanes); Italian [kataˈlaːni] (catalani); Sardinian [kaðɛˈlanɔzɔ] (cadelanos) or [kataˈlanɔzɔ] (catalanos))
Total population
- c. 9 million

Regions with significant populations
- Spain (people born in Catalonia of any ethnicity; excludes ethnic Catalans in other regions in Spain): 8,005,784 (2023)
- France (people born in Pyrénées-Orientales): 491,000 (2023)
- Argentina (estimates vary): 188,000
- Mexico: 63,000
- Germany: 43,000 (2020)
- Peru: 39,000
- Andorra: 16,555 (2024)
- Chile: 16,000
- Brazil: 11,787
- Venezuela: 6,200
- Colombia: 6,100
- Cuba: 3,600
- Ecuador: 3,500
- United States (estimates vary): 700-1,750
- Canada: 1,283
- Finland: 103

Languages
- Catalan, Catalan Sign; Occitan (In Aran Valley); Spanish, French, Italian (as a result of immigration or language shift)

Religion
- Catholicism; Irreligion; Other minority groups

Related ethnic groups
- Occitans, Spaniards (Aragonese, Castilians), Valencians, Northern Italians, Sardinians

Catalans (Catalan, French and Occitan: catalans; Spanish: catalanes; Italian: catalani; Sardinian: cadelanos or catalanos) are a Romance-speaking ethnic group native to Catalonia, who speak Catalan. The current official category of "Catalans" is that of the citizens of Catalonia, a nationality and autonomous community in Spain and the inhabitants of the Roussillon historical region in Southern France, today the Pyrénées Orientales department, also called Northern Catalonia and Pays Catalan in French.

Some authors also extend the word "Catalans" to include all people from all the areas where Catalan is spoken, namely those from Andorra, Valencia, the Balearic Islands, eastern Aragon, and the city of Alghero in Sardinia.

The Catalan government regularly surveys its population regarding its "sentiment of belonging". As of July 2024, results point out that 41.1% of Catalans and other people living in Catalonia identify as only Catalans or more Catalan than Spanish, 44.1% feel both Catalan and Spanish, and 11.6% see themselves as only Spanish or more Spanish than Catalan.

== Historical background ==
In 1500 BCE the area that is now known primarily as Catalonia was, along with the rest of the Iberian Peninsula, inhabited by Proto-Celtic Urnfield people who brought with them the rite of burning the dead. Much of the Pyrenees mountains was inhabited at the time by peoples related to modern Basques, and today many town names in the western Catalan Pyrenees can be linked to Basque etymologies. These groups came under the rule of various invading groups starting with the Greeks that founded Empúries and the Phoenicians and Carthaginians, who set up colonies along the coast, including Barcino (present-day Barcelona). Following the Punic Wars, the Romans replaced the Carthaginians as the dominant power in the Iberian eastern coast, including parts of Catalonia, by 206 BCE. Rome established Latin as the official language and imparted a distinctly Roman culture upon the local population, which merged with Roman colonists from the Italian Peninsula. An early precursor to the Catalan language began to develop from a local form of popular Latin before and during the collapse of the Roman Empire. Various Germanic tribes arrived following nearly six centuries of Roman rule, which had completely transformed the area into the Roman province of Tarraconensis. The German Visigoths established themselves in the fifth century, making their first capital in the Iberian peninsula Barcelona, and they later would move to Toledo.

This continued until 718 when Muslim Arabs took control of the region in order to pass through the Pyrenees into French territory. The Franks on the other side of the Pyrenees held back the main Muslim raiding army which had penetrated virtually unchallenged as far as central France at the Battle of Tours in 732. Frankish suzerainty was then extended over much of present-day northern half of Catalonia. With the help of the Franks, a land border was created commonly known nowadays as Old Catalonia (which would consist of the counties County of Barcelona, Ausona, County of Pallars, County of Rosselló, County of Empúries, County of Cerdanya and County of Urgell) which faced Muslim raids but resisted any kind of settlement from them. The southern New Catalonia was under Arab/Muslim rule for about 4-5 centuries. As the border between Muslim and Frankish realms stabilized, Barcelona would become an important center for Christian forces in the Iberian Peninsula. In the 10th century, the County of Barcelona and the other neighboring counties became independent from West Francia.

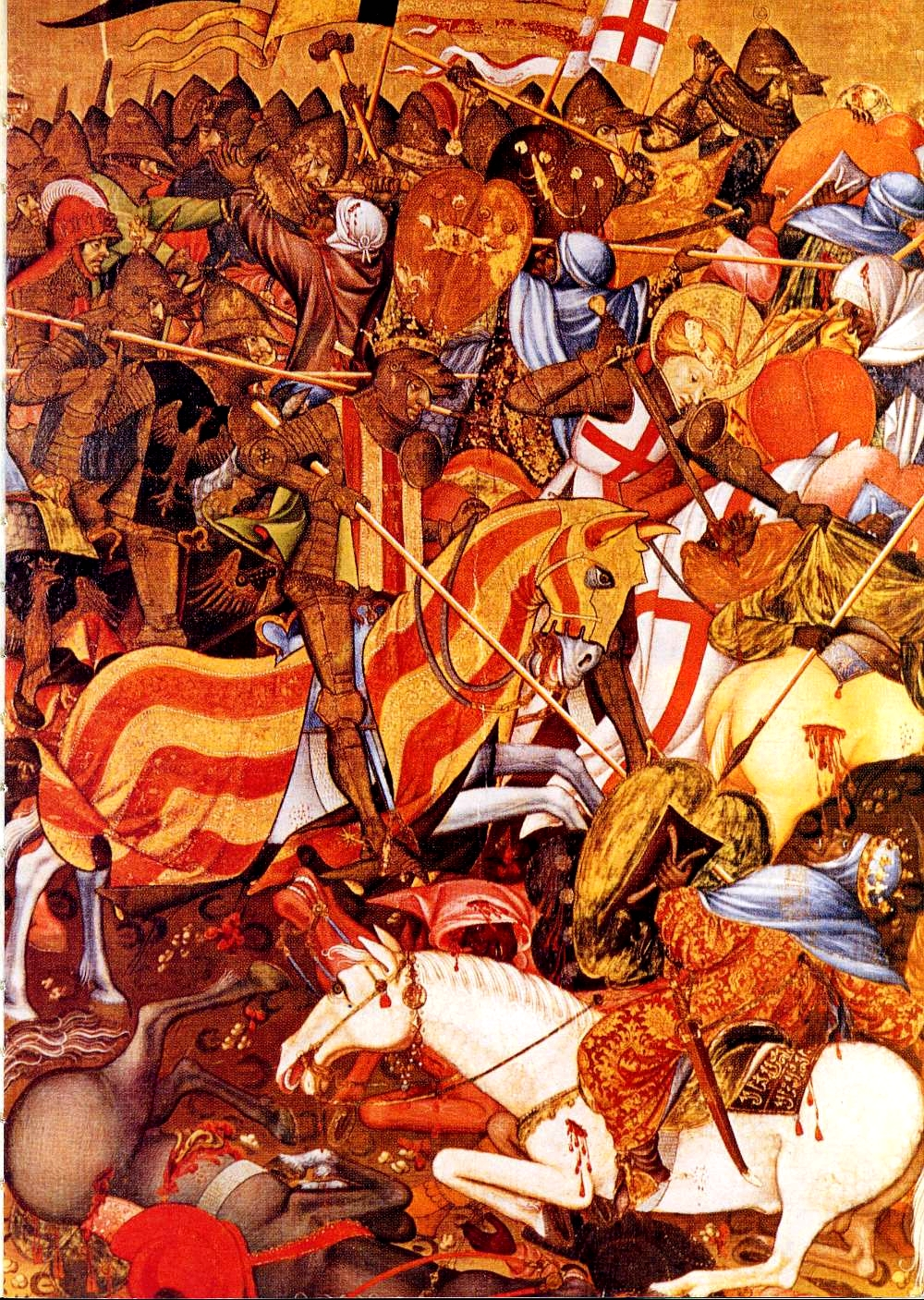
Battle of the Puig (ca. 1405) by Andreu Marçal de Sax, depicting the Christian victory with the aid of Saint George

In 1137, the County of Barcelona entered a dynastic union with the Kingdom of Aragon to form what modern historians call the Crown of Aragon in the so-called "Reconquista". This allowed the conquest of Muslim-dominated lands, eventually establishing the kingdoms of Valencia and Majorca (the Balearic Islands). From the late 12th century onwards, the territory of the County of Barcelona and the other Catalan counties progressively began to be identified as a single political entity and, from the mid-14th century, that state began to be known as the Principality of Catalonia. The crisis of the late Middle Ages, the loss of hegemony within the Crown, as well as urban and feudal internal conflicts led to the Catalan Civil War in 1462. In the last quarter of the 15th century, the marriage of Isabella I of Castile and Ferdinand II of Aragon led to the dynastic union of the Crown of Aragon with the Crown of Castille, in which each of the constitutive realm kept its own laws, policies, power structures, borders and monetary systems.

Continuous unrest led to conflicts on the states of the Crown of Aragon, such as the Revolt of the Germanies in Valencia and Majorca, and the 1640 revolt in Catalonia known as the Reapers' War. This latter conflict embroiled Spain in a larger war with France as the Catalan institutions allied themselves with Louis XIII. The war continued until 1659 and ended with the Treaty of the Pyrenees, which effectively partitioned the Principality of Catalonia as its northern strip came under French rule, while the rest remained under Spanish Crown. The Catalan government took sides with the Habsburg pretender against the Bourbon one during the War of the Spanish Succession that started in 1705 and ended in 1714. The Catalan failure to defend the continuation of Habsburg rule in Spain despite unilaterally prolonging the war against the Bourbons culminated in the capitulation of Barcelona on 11 September 1714 which came to be commemorated as Catalonia's National Day. The surrender led to the imposition of absolutism and the abolition of Catalan political institutions and legal system, thus ending the status of Catalonia as a separate state within a personal union.

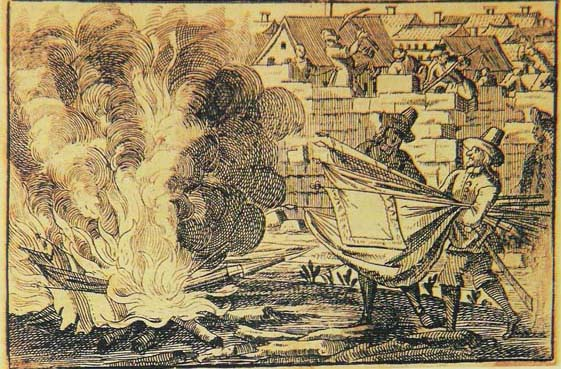
After the Catalan defeat during the War of Spanish Succession, Philip V of Spain ordered the burning of all the Catalan flags and banners.

During the Napoleonic Wars, much of Catalonia was seized by French forces by 1808, as France ruled the entire country of Spain briefly until Napoleon's surrender to Allied Armies. In France, strong assimilationist policies integrated many Catalans into French society, while in Spain a Catalan identity was increasingly suppressed in favor of a Spanish national identity. The Catalans regained autonomy during the Spanish Second Republic from 1932 until Francisco Franco's nationalist forces occupied Catalonia by 1939. It was not until 1975 and the death of Franco that the Catalans as well as other Spaniards began to regain their right to cultural expression, which was restarted by the Spanish Constitution of 1978. Since this period, a balance between a sense of Catalan national identity versus the broader Spanish one has emerged as the dominant political force in Catalonia. The former tends to advocate for even greater autonomy, national recognition and, part of it, independence; the latter tends to argue for maintaining either a status quo or removal of autonomy and cultural identity, depending on the leanings of the current government. As a result, there tends to be much fluctuation depending on regional and national politics during a given election cycle. Given the stronger centralist tendencies in France, however, French Catalans display a much less dynamic sense of uniqueness, having been integrated more consistently into the unitary French national identity.

== Geography ==
The vast majority of Catalans reside in the autonomous community of Catalonia, in the northeast part of Spain. At least 100,000 Catalan speakers live in the Pays Catalan in France. An indeterminate number of Catalans emigrated to the Americas during the Spanish colonial period and to France in the years following the Spanish Civil War.

== Culture and society ==
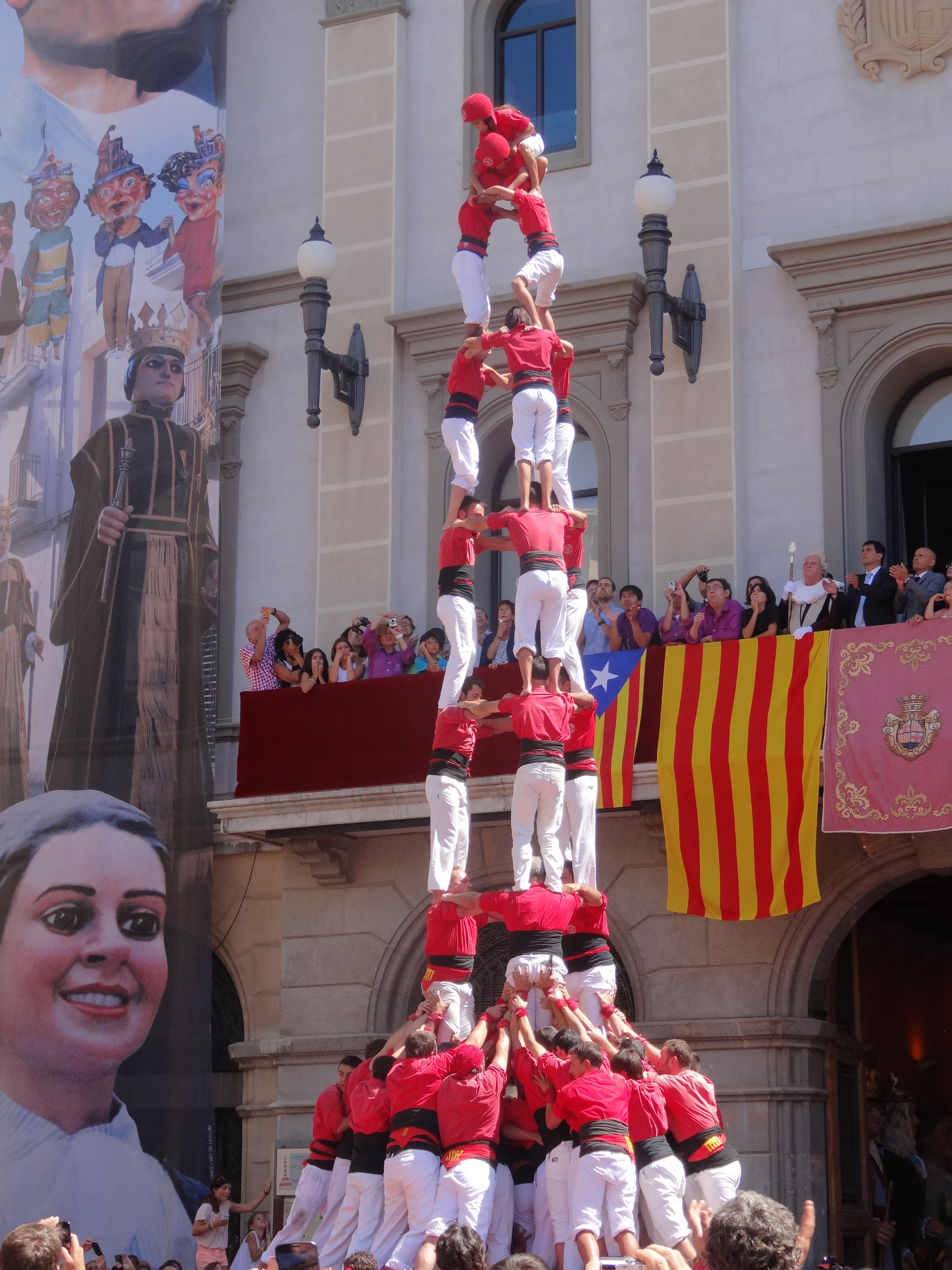
The castells, human towers, are part of the Catalan culture since 1712 and were declared by UNESCO to be amongst the Masterpieces of the Oral and Intangible Heritage of Humanity.

Described by author Walter Starkie in The Road to Santiago as a subtle people, he sums up their national character with a local term seny meaning "common sense" or a pragmatic attitude toward life. The counterpart of Catalan "seny" is "rauxa" or madness, epitomized by "crazy", eccentric and creative Catalan artists like Antoni Gaudí, Salvador Dalí, Joan Miró or Antoni Tàpies. The masia or mas is a defining characteristic of the Catalan countryside and includes a large house, land, cattle, and an extended family, but this tradition is in decline as the nuclear family has largely replaced the extended family, as in the rest of western Europe. Catalonia in Spain is officially recognised as a "nationality" and enjoy a high degree of political autonomy, which has led to reinforcement of a Catalan identity.

=== Language ===
A Catalan speaker from Mallorca

The Catalan language is a Romance language. It is the language closest to Occitan, and it also shares many features with other Romance languages such as Spanish, French, Portuguese, Aragonese, and Italian. There are a number of linguistic varieties that are considered dialects of Catalan, among them, the dialect group with the most speakers, Central Catalan.

The total number of Catalan speakers is over 9.8 million (2011), with 5.9 million residing in Catalonia. More than half of them speak Catalan as a second language, with native speakers being about 4.4 million of those (more than 2.8 in Catalonia). Very few Catalan monoglots exist; basically, virtually all of the Catalan speakers in Spain are bilingual speakers of Catalan and Spanish, with a sizable population of Spanish-only speakers of immigrant origin (typically born outside Catalonia or with both parents born outside Catalonia) existing in the major Catalan urban areas as well. In Roussillon, only a minority of French Catalans speak Catalan nowadays, with French being the majority language for the inhabitants after a continued process of language shift. According to a 2019 survey by the Catalan government, 31.5% of the inhabitants of Catalonia have Catalan as first language at home whereas 52.7% have Spanish, 2.8% both Catalan and Spanish and 10.8% other languages.

The inhabitants of the Aran valley count Aranese–an Occitan dialect–rather than Catalan as their own language. These Catalans are also bilingual in Spanish.

In September 2005, the .cat TLD, the first Internet language-based top-level domain, was approved for all web pages intending to serve the needs of the Catalan linguistic and cultural community on the Internet. This community is made up of those who use the Catalan language for their online communication or promote the different aspects of Catalan culture online.

=== Traditional clothes ===
The traditional dress (now practically only used in folkloric celebrations) included the barretina (a sort of woollen, long cap usually red or purple) and the faixa (a sort of wide belt) among men, and ret (a fine net bag to contain hair) among women. The traditional footwear was the espardenya or espadrille.

Other items of clothing typical of Catalan female folk costume include the 'pubilla' dress; the 'catalana' also known as the 'pagesa' and the 'gandalla' as headwear.

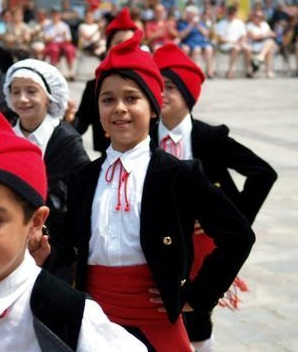
Catalan children wearing the traditional outfit, including the barretina

=== Cuisine ===
==== Traditional diet ====
The Catalan diet is part of the Mediterranean diet and includes the use of olive oil. Catalan people like to eat veal (vedella) and lamb (xai).

There are three main daily meals:

- In the morning: a very light breakfast, consisting of fruit or fruit juice, milk, coffee, or pa amb tomàquet "bread with tomato". Catalans tend to divide their breakfast into two parts: one early in the morning before going to work or study (first breakfast), and the other one between 10:00 and 12:00 (second breakfast)
- In the afternoon (roughly from 13:00 to 14:30): the main meal of the day, usually comprising three dishes. The first consists of pasta or vegetables, the second of meat or fish, and the third of fruit or yogurt
- In the evening (roughly from 20:00 to 22:30): more food than in the morning, but less than at lunch; very often only a single main dish and fruit; it is common to drink moderate quantities of wine.

In Catalan gastronomy, embotits (a wide variety of Catalan sausages and cold meats) are very important; these are pork sausages such as botifarra or fuet. In the past, bread figured heavily in the Catalan diet; now it is used mainly in the morning (second breakfast, especially among young students and some workers) and supplements the noon meal, at home and in restaurants. Bread is still popular among Catalans; some Catalan fast-food restaurants don't serve hamburgers, but offer a wide variety of sandwiches.

In the past, the poor ate soup every day and rice on Thursday and Sunday.

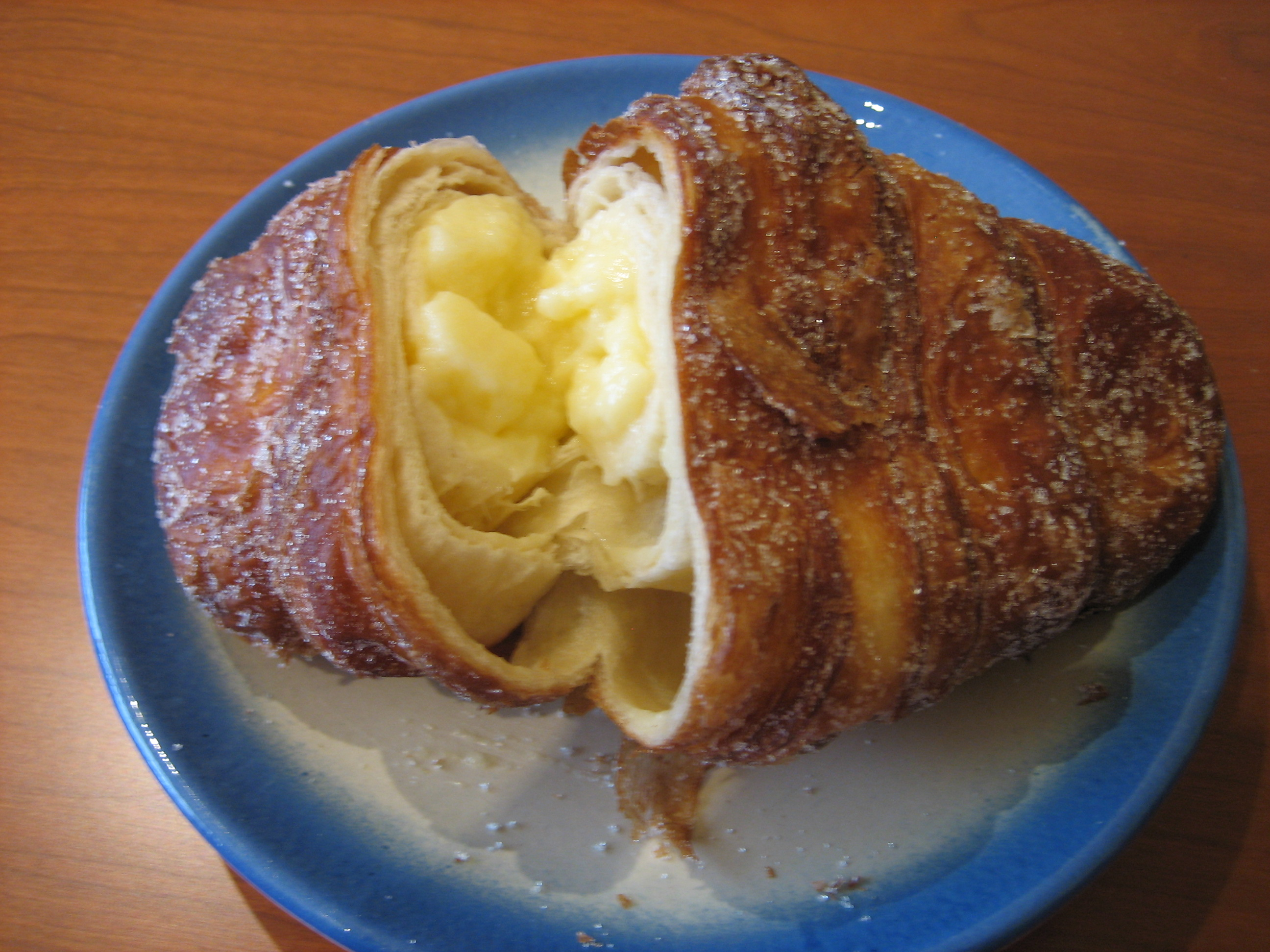
Catalans have a rich cuisine, including traditional desserts like the xuixo. Also, Catalan chefs like Ferran Adrià i Acosta or Jordi Roca i Fontané are widely renowned.

The discipline of abstinence, not eating meat during Lent, once was very strong, but today it is only practiced in the rural areas. Spicy food is rare in the Catalan diet but there are quite garlicky sauces such as allioli or romesco.

==== Traditional dishes ====
One type of Catalan dish is escudella, a soup which contains chick peas, potatoes, and vegetables such as green cabbage, celery, carrots, turnips, and meats such as botifarra (a Catalan sausage), pork feet, salted ham, chicken, and veal. In Northern Catalonia, it is sometimes called ollada.

Other Catalan dishes include calçots (a type of onions that are similar in shape to leeks, often grilled and eaten with a romesco sauce) and escalivada.

=== Music ===
Catalan music has one of the oldest documented musical traditions in Europe.

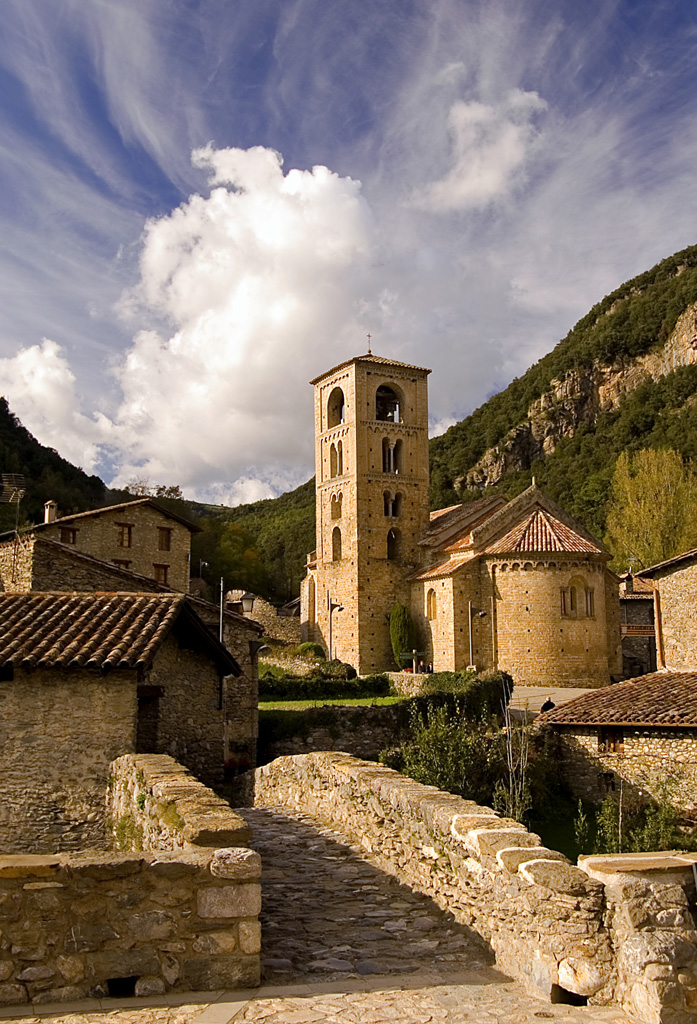
Catalans, traditionally devoted Catholics, during its recent history had become much less religious. Even so, the presence of religion is maintained through the traditions, values and monuments, like the Church of Sant Cristòfol de Beget.

=== Religion ===
The traditional religion in Catalonia is Roman Catholicism. However, in the course of recent history, Catalonia has undergone several waves of secularization.

The first wave of secularization happened during the eighteenth century as a result of the enlightenment influence to the bourgeoisie. The second one happened during the nineteenth century, that had a huge impact on the lower and middle class, but was interrupted by the outbreak of the Spanish Civil War (1936–1939).

The end of the Francoist regime led to a loss of power by the Catholic Church and to another wave of secularization that extends since the 1980s. During the 1990s most of the population of Catalonia was non-practising Catholic. Nowadays 52.4% of Catalans declare themselves Catholic, practising or not, 30.2% of Catalans are agnostic or atheist, and there is also a considerable share of other religions, often connected to recent immigration: 7.3% Muslim, 2.5% Evangelical, 1.3% Buddhism, and 1.2% Orthodox Christians. According to the most recent study sponsored by the government of Catalonia, as of 2016, 61.9% of the Catalans identify as Christians, up from 56.5% in 2014. At the same time, 16.0% of the population identify as atheists, 11.9% as agnostics, 4.8% as Muslims, 1.3% as Buddhists, and a further 2.4% as being of other religions.

=== Social conditions ===
Catalonia is one of the richest and most developed regions in Southern Europe. Barcelona is among the most industrialized metropolises. A regional capital, it is a magnet for domestic and foreign migrants.

=== Celebrations ===
Fire is the element used in most important traditional festivals, which are derived from pagan roots. These celebrations have a high acceptance of fire between the Catalans, like the Flame of Canigó to the Bonfires of Saint John.

An important and well-known celebration is the Diada de Sant Jordi, held on 23 April, in which men give women roses, and women give men a book.

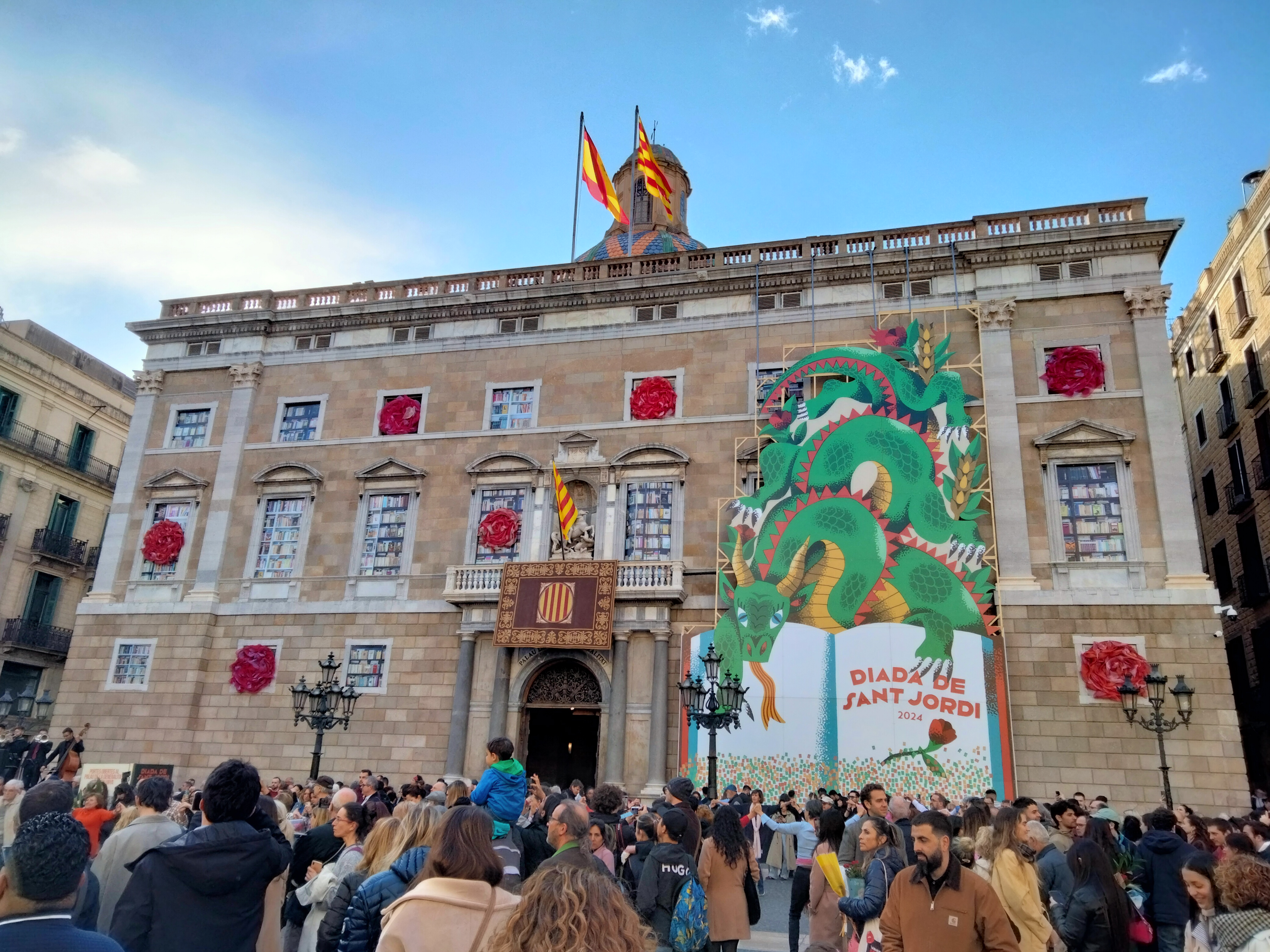
Saint George's Day In Barcelona

Historical memory is the second axis of celebrations in Catalonia, where the Catalan people reunite with their date of birth as a people.

Among the religious celebrations, there are St. George's Day and the celebrations of Saint Vincent Martyr and Saint Anthony Abbot. The maximum expressions of this element are the Easter processions and performances of Passion Plays. Some festivals have a complicated relationship with religion, such as Carnival and the Dances of Death, or specific aspects of Christmas such as the Tió de Nadal or the caganer in Nativity scenes.

Other key elements of a Catalan celebration are: food, central to every party and especially to the pig slaughter and harvest festivals; contests such as the castells (human towers), choice of major and festive floats; music, songs and bands; processions; dances; and animals, especially bulls and representations of mythological creatures. The Patum of Berga has been declared a World Heritage Site by UNESCO.

=== Symbolism ===
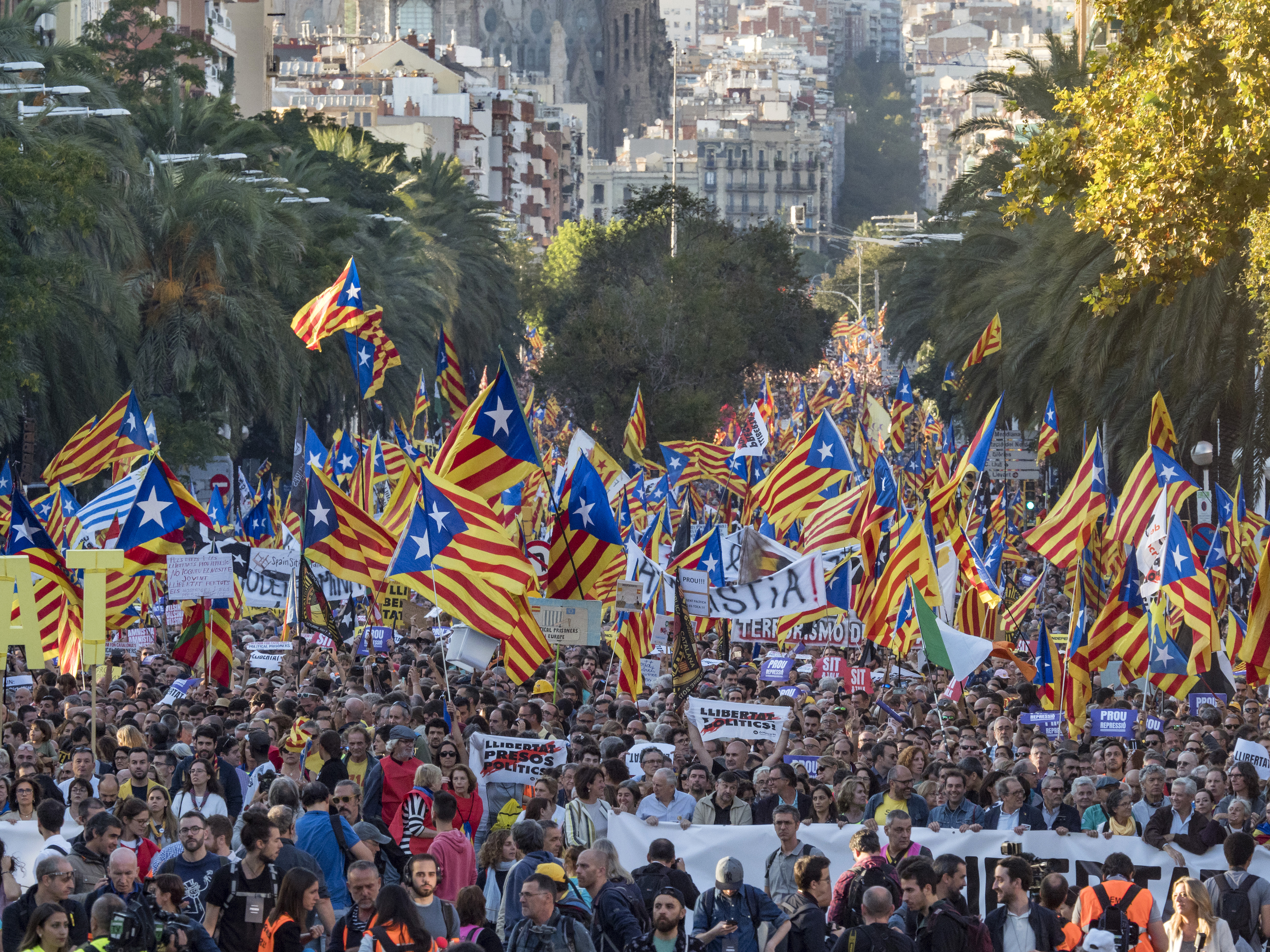
Catalan protesters in Barcelona in 2019

Because of their intertwining history, many of the traditional symbols of Catalonia coincide with Aragon, Valencia and the Balearic Islands. The oldest known Catalan symbol is the coat of arms of the King of Aragon and Count of Barcelona, or bars of Aragon, one of Europe's oldest heraldic emblems; in modern times, Catalan nationalists have made it the main symbol of Catalan identity and it is even associated with the Catalan language.

As for anthems, "The Reapers" (Els Segadors) is the official national anthem of Catalonia and is also used in the other lands of the Principality; the Balanguera represents the people from the Balearic Islands and, in the case of Valencia, the official "Anthem of the Exhibition" (Himne de l'Exposició) alongside Muixeranga as symbols of the country.

== See also ==
- List of Catalans
- History of Catalonia
- Catalan myths and legends
- Valencian people
- Aragonese people
- Andorran people
- Catalan Americans
- History of political Catalanism

== Sources ==
- Balcells, Albert (12 January 1996). Catalan Nationalism: Past and Present. Translated by Hall, Jacqueline. Springer. ISBN 978-1-349-24278-8.
- Capdevila, Alexandra (2013). Entre el catolicisme, l'agnosticisme i l'ateisme. Una aproximació al perfil religiós dels catalans [Between catholicism, agnosticism and atheism. An approach to the Catalan religious profile.] (PDF) (Report) (in Catalan). Centre d'Estudis d'Opinió (CEO). p. 86. B.17768-2013. Archived from the original (PDF) on 19 August 2013.
- Collier, Basil (1939). Catalan France. J.M. Dent and Sons Ltd.
- Conversi, Daniele (1997). The Basques, the Catalans and Spain: Alternative Routes to Nationalist Mobilization. University of Nevada Press. ISBN 1-85065-268-6.
- Guibernau, Montserrat (2004). Catalan Nationalism: Francoism, Transition and Democracy. Routledge.
- Hargreaves, John (2000). Freedom for Catalonia?: Catalan Nationalism, Spanish Identity and the Barcelona Olympic Games. Cambridge University Press.
- Simonis, Damien (2003). Lonely Planet Catalunya & the Costa Brava. Lonely Planet Publications.
- Starkie, Walter (2003). The Road to Santiago. John Murray.
- Michelin THE GREEN GUIDE France. Michelin Travel Publications. 2000.
