= Ibn al-Abbar =

Arab poet, diplomat, theologian and scholar (1199–1260)

Ibn al-Abbār
- أبو عبد الله محمد بن عبد الله القضاعي البلنسي
- Born: 1199; Valencia
- Died: January 6, 1260; Tunis
- Other names: Abū Abd Allāh Muḥammad ibn 'Abdullah ibn Abū Bakr al-Qudā'ī al-Balansī; also Abū ‘Abd Allāh Muḥammad ibn Abī Bakr al-Kudāi
- Occupations: Biographer, Historian, Encyclopedist, Poet, Ambassador

Ibn al-Abbār (ابن الأبار), he was Hāfiẓ Abū Abd Allāh Muḥammad ibn 'Abdullah ibn Abū Bakr al-Qudā'ī al-Balansī (أبو عبد الله محمد بن عبد الله بن أبي بكر بن عبد الله بن عبد الرحمن القضاعي البلنسي) (1199–1260) a secretary to Hafsid dynasty princes, well-known poet, diplomat, jurist and hadith scholar from al-Andalus and perhaps the most famous man of letters produced by the city of Valencia ('Balansiya') during the Middle Ages.

== Life ==
Ibn al-Abbār's family, who were of Yemeni Arab ("al-Qudā'ī") ancestry, had lived for generations in the village of Onda. As an only son, his father, a scholar, a faqīh (jurist) and a poet, gave him the best education. He was taught by famous scholars of the time, such as Abū l-Rabi 'ibn al-Sālim, and cultivated in jurisprudence and poetry. He also travelled through al-Andalus. In 1222, while in Badajoz, he learned of his father's death; he returned to Valencia, became secretary (kātib) to the governor Abū Zayd and married. In 1229 a revolt against the Almohades forced Abū Zayd to flee the city; accompanied by his secretary, the governor took refuge with king James I of Aragon. When his patron converted to Christianity, Ibn al-Abbār abandoned him and returned to Valencia in 1231 to become vizier to the new ruler, Abū Jamil ibn Zayyan ibn Mardanish, whom he knew from an earlier period. Also around 1235, he was qadi (judge) for a time at Dénia. In 1236 Cordova fell to Ferdinand III of Castile and in 1237 James I of Aragon defeated Ibn Mardanish at the Battle of the Puig; the siege of Valencia began soon after. Abu Jamil sent Ibn al-Abbār to seek help from Abū Zakariyā Yaḥyā, the Hafsid sultan of Tunis. The ambassador declaimed before the Sultan a famous "qasīda" celebrating "al-Andalus" and deploring his tragic situation. Abū Zakariyā sent a fleet of twelve ships, which failed however to reach the blockaded port of Valencia, and was forced to anchor at Dénia. Subsequently, Ibn al-Abbār was charged by the emir with negotiating the surrender of Valencia, which was signed on September 29, 1238. The two fled to Dénia and Murcia, and in 1240 Ibn al-Abbār emigrated permanently to Tunis.

He was once again welcomed by Abū Zakariyā, and appointed head of his chancery and his panegyrist. But with a shady character, and enemies at court (notably the vizier Ibn Abul Husayn), he was replaced and exiled to Béjaïa in 1248. Although Abū Zakariyā before his death in 1249 had forgiven and recalled him, and he became counsellor to Abū Zakariyā's successor, Muhammad I al-Mustansir, ibn al-Abbār was again banished to Bejaia in 1252. After the fall of the Abbāsid Caliphate of Baghdad (1258), Muhammad I al-Mustansir had proclaimed himself caliph (and was recognized as such in Mecca and Medina). In 1259, Ibn al-Abbār was again forgiven and recalled to Tunis. Soon after he was arrested, it seems, either for conspiracy or satire, and sentenced to be burnt at the stake. The details are unknown but a poem found and believed to have been by him, contained the following verse: "In Tunis reigns a tyrant who is foolishly called caliph." He was put to death by order of al-Mustansir, the ruler of Tunis, on 6 January 1260, and his body along with his books were burned. An account of this is given by Ibn Khaldūn in his Kitab al-'Ibar (The Book of Examples).

== Works ==
Of the forty-five books by Ibn al-Abbār, eight survive:

- Kitāb al-Takmila li Kitāb al-ṣila (كتاب التكملة لالكتاب الصلىة); at-Takmila ('Supplement') to the Ta'rīkh' Ulamā 'al-Andalus ('History of the scholars of Andalusia') of Ibn al-Faradi (962-1013), to which Ibn Bashkuwāl (1101-1183) had written a sequel history Ṣila fī ta'rīkh a'immat al-Andalus. The bio-bibliographic repertoire was a particularly flourishing literary genre in Muslim Spain when ibn al-Abbār's Valencian master Abū l-Rabi 'ibn al-Sālim prompted him to complete the two works of the previous generation. He began working on “The Supplement” in 1233 at Valencia, and finally completed it in Tunis. It lists (in alphabetical order) more than three thousand personages in the literary and cultural history of Muslim Spain. In the introduction, the author makes clear his concern about the threats to his homeland and his desire to save some of his intellectual heritage for posterity.

At-Takmila; published in several incomplete editions from different manuscripts:

- Complementum libri assilah: dictionarium biographicum (in Arabic; Romero Matriti, 1877); vols., 5&6, vols., 7&8, vols., 9&10
- Complementum Libri as-Sila, ed., Francisco Codera Zaidin, Madrid, Biblioteca Arabo-Hispana, 2 vols., nos. V-VI, 1888–89); 2152. biographies from the El Escorial copy, and 600 from Algiers MS; begins with the letter ج (ğīm).
- Miscelaneas de estudios y textos árabes, eds., Maximiliano Alarcón and Cándido Ángel González Palencia, Madrid, 1915, pp. 147–690); an appendix to previous, from a manuscript of Cairo, with biographies nos., 2150 - 2892.
- Takmila from Fez MS, ed., Alfred Bel and Mohamed Bencheneb (Algiers, 1920); 652 biographies of the first five letters from the letter alif .
- Takmila from Cairo MS, ed., 'Abd al-'Aṭṭār al-Ḥusayni (2 vols., Baghdad and Cairo, 1956), begins with the letter alif, comprising 2188 biographies.
- Kitāb al-ḥulla al-siyarā ('Book of the embroidered tunic'), finished at Béjaïa in 1248/49, compendium of the poetic-literary field.
- Tuḥfat al-qādim (تحفة القادم), 'Newcomer's gift'; life and works of the Andalusian poets of his time.
- I'tāb al-kuttāb, a short collection of stories of disgraced and rehabilitated officials, written during his exile at Béjaïa.
- Al-‘Arba’ūn (الأربعون), ‘The Forty (traditions)’; See (لأربعون حديثًا).
- Durar al-simṭ fī khabar al-sibṭ (درر السِّمط في خبر السِّبط), ‘Pearl necklace on the reports of the grandson’; written during his second stay at Béjaïa, a religious work of Shiite leanings defending the persecuted lineage of 'Ali.
- Dīwān (‘collected poems’) of Ibn al-Abbār.
- Ya’nī al-Ḥusayn ibn ‘Alī (يعني الحسين بن علي) ‘meaning Husayn ibn Ali’.

== Bibliography ==
- Khallikān (Ibn), Aḥmad ibn Muḥammad (1843). Ibn Khallikan’s Biographical Dictionary (tr. Wafayāt al-A‘yān wa-al-Anbā Abnā’ al-Zamān). Vol. ii. Translated by McGuckin de Slane, William. London: W.H. Allen. p. 424, n.3.
- Bel, Alfred; Bencheneb, Mohamed (1918). "The preface of Ibn al-Abbar to his" Takmila as-sila". African Review (294). Paris: 306–335.
- Ghedira, Ameur (1957). "An unpublished treatise of Ibn al-Abbar with Shia tendency". Al-Andalus. 22. Madrid-Granada: 30–54.
- Meouak, Mohamed (1985). "Ibn al-Abbār's "Takmilla": notes and observations about his editions". Journal of the Muslim West and the Mediterranean. 40: 143–146.
- Ibn al-Abbar, politic i escriptor Arab valencia (1199–1260): Actes del Congres Internacional "Ibn Al-Abbar i el seu temps," Onda, 20-22 febrer, 1989 by Mikel Epalza, Jesus Huguet (review Journal of the American Oriental Society, Vol. 112, No. 2 (Apr. - Jun., 1992), pp. 313–314)
- "Ibn al-Abbar, politic i escriptor derab valencià (1199-1260)". proceedings of the international congress "Ibn al-Abbar i el seu temps (in Spanish). Valencia: Generalitat Valenciana. 1990.
