= Siege of Burriana =

1233 battle in Valencia

Coordinates: 39°53′22″N 0°05′03″W

- Part of the Reconquista (Aragonese Conquest of Valencia)
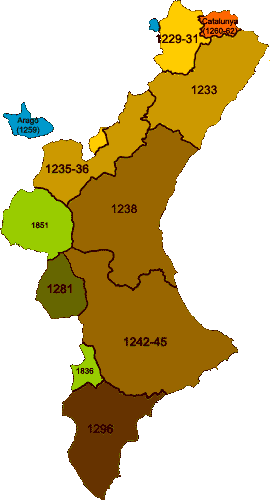
- Chronological map documenting the Conquest of Valencia.
| Date | May-July 1233 |
| Location | Burriana, Province of Castellón, Spain |
| Result | Burriana captured by James I of Aragon |

Belligerents
| Crown of Aragon; Knights Hospitaller; Knights Templar; Senyoria d'Albarrasí | Taifa of Valencia |

Commanders and leaders
| James I of Aragon; Bernat Guillem d'Entença | Unknown |

The Siege of Burriana was one of three major military actions of James I of Aragon in his campaign to take control of the Muslim Taifa of Valencia in the 13th Century. In this battle, James I conducted a siege that continued for approximately two months and eventually took possession of the city by means of a negotiated settlement.

== Background ==
For the first 500 years of the Reconquista, the city and territory of Valencia on the eastern coast of the Iberian Peninsula along the Mediterranean Sea had been held and occupied almost exclusively by the Muslims. During that long history, Christian polities had ruled Valencia for only a short 16-year period at the end of the 11th Century.

In 1229, however, the political landscape of Valencia underwent great change. In January of that year, Zayyan ibn Mardanish, a member of a prominent eastern Andalusi Muslim family, displaced the Almohad governor of Valencia, occupied the capital city, assumed the title of emir, and established an independent Muslim government. In addition, Zayyan repudiated Almohad authority and acknowledged the Abbasid caliph in Baghdad as his religious-political overlord.

The former governor of Valencia, Zayd Abu Zayd, in turn sought assistance from James I to recover his territories. In return for assistance, Zayd agreed to become an ally of the Argonese while James I secured rights over territories acquired in a joint struggle against Zayyan and a share of revenues from lands recovered. As such, the alliance ultimately caused James I to intervene in Valencian affairs and initiate a concerted effort to conquest Valencia.

The Argonese campaign to take control of Valencia began in earnest in 1231 when Blasco de Alagón, a powerful noble of James I, attacked and captured the castle of Morella, a strong hilltop fortification in the mountainous interior of northern Valencia. Morella served as an administrative and military center for an extensive district containing smaller settlements and fortifications. Then in 1233, as a part of a northern campaign, James I, leading the Argonese royal army, targeted Burriana.

Burriana was a fortified stronghold located on the coastal plain approximately 55 kilometers north of the city of Valencia. It was surrounded by productive agricultural land and provided provisions to the Muslim outposts and castles located in the mountainous interior of the northern reaches of the Valencian territory. Capturing Burriana would make it difficult for the Muslim outposts in the interior of northern Valencia to continue resisting and would provide James I with an important forward base to advance south toward the city of Valencia.

== The siege ==
James I and his army arrived at Burriana in mid-May 1233. Burriana was a fortified city a few kilometers inland from the Mediterranean Sea. Although there is no evidence that the city had either a castle or citadel, its defenses included fortified city walls with defensive towers; a surrounding ditch or moat; and an outer defensive system of some nature potentially fortified gateways or a continuous outer defensive structure known as an antemuro.

After establishing his camp, James I set about putting a siege in place. It is not known for certain the degree to which he was effective at completely surrounding the city or the degree to which he was initially able to restrict entry and egress. As opposed to simply attempting to starve Burriana into submission, James I rapidly began the bombardment of the city’s fortifications by means of a fenèvol and mangonel. It is believed that James I did so as he was concerned that the city was well stocked with provisions and could easily be relieved. In addition, it is also believed that it was James I's primary objective to destroy Burriana and eliminate the support that it provided to the Muslim outposts in the northern territory as quickly as possible.

Following the failure of the initial attack, the Argonese bombarded the city from a mobile siege tower. The defenders of the city responded by counter-attacking the Christians with stone-throwing algarrades built into the city's defensive works. In addition, the Muslims initiated a series of sorties outside the city’s walls with the objectives of the raids being the destruction of the siege tower; the general disruption of the Argonese encampment; and the seizure of livestock.

After the Argonese siege tower was damaged and abandoned, they attempted to causes portions of the city wall to collapse by digging tunnels up to and under the foundations. Those efforts also failed when the Argonese emerged from the tunnels and attempted to fight their way through the damaged defenses.

After the initial period of attack and counter-attack, the defenders of the city offered to surrender after one month if the king of Valencia had not relieved them. James I was unwilling to allow a month to pass without surrender and rejected the offer. Relief never came and negotiations were resumed fairly quickly.

There is no evidence that the resumption of negotiations was a result of a lack of foodstuffs or other provisions. Rather, it seems that the Muslims recognized that their position was becoming increasingly precarious as the city’s walls and defenses continued to be compromised. Seemingly, James I was also drawn to negotiations as he understood that the city contained substantial stores of grain, which he desired to preserve for his own army.

Eventually, the parties agreed that the inhabitants would surrender the town and depart. James I promised the city’s defenders safe passage to Nules, a Muslim settlement a short way to the south. The siege had spanned approximately months, ending in mid-July.

== Aftermath ==
After capturing Burriana, James I did not immediately proceed south to siege or attack the city of Valencia. The conquest of Burriana was undertaken primarily to weaken Muslim control in the northern areas of Valencia, not to serve as an immediate stepping stone to the capital city.

In the months that followed, the loss of Burriana caused the Muslims to capitulate numerous northern settlements and castles including Peniscola, Castelló de la Plana, Borriol, les Coves de Vinromà and Vilafamés. In the years that followed, James I secured the northern territory; expanded into the Alto Palancia region; and organized the manpower, finances, and political backing necessary to attack the city of Valencia. The next decisive battle in James I campaign to take control of the Taifa of Valencia would occur at El Puig in 1237 as he set up his forward base to threaten the capital's northern approaches and agricultural hinterland.

== Citations ==
- Benedito Nuez, Josep; Melchor Monserrat, José Manuel (2020). "Evidencias, aspectos materiales y técnicas constructivas del recinto amurallado de la madīna Buryāna (Burriana, Castellón)". Arqueología de la Arquitectura. 17 e096. doi:10.3989/arq.arqt.2020.006.
- Chevedden, Paul E. (2011). "King James I the Conqueror and the Artillery Revolution of the Middle Ages". In Ferrer i Mallol, Maria Teresa (ed.). Jaume I: Commemoració del VIII centenari del naixement de Jaume I (PDF). Vol. 1. Barcelona: Institut d'Estudis Catalans. pp. 313–339.
- Guichard, Pierre (1990–1991). Les musulmans de Valence et la Reconquête (XIe–XIIIe siècles) (in French). Vol. 1–2. Damascus: Institut français de Damas.
- Guinot Rodríguez, Enric (2017). "La nobleza aragonesa en los orígenes del reino de Valencia durante el siglo XIII" (PDF). In Sarasa Sánchez, Esteban (ed.). Bajar al reino: Relaciones sociales, económicas y comerciales entre Aragón y Valencia: siglos XIII–XIV (in Spanish). Zaragoza: Institución Fernando el Católico. pp. 167–222. ISBN 978-84-9911-430-9.
- Hitchcock, Richard (2014). Muslim Spain Reconsidered: From 711 to 1502. Edinburgh University Press. ISBN 9780748678280.
- James I of Aragon. "Chronicle of James the Conqueror, Siege of Burriana (1233)". De Re Militari. The Society for Medieval Military History.
- Linajes de Aragón (PDF) (in Spanish). Los Cornel. Archived from the original (PDF) on 2011-03-04.
- Utrilla Utrilla, Juan F. (2017). "De la "extremadura" aragonesa al reino de Valencia: las tierras de frontera entre el mundo cristiano feudal y el Sharq al-Andalus (1170–1240)" (PDF). In Sarasa Sánchez, Esteban (ed.). Bajar al reino: Relaciones sociales, económicas y comerciales entre Aragón y Valencia: siglos XIII–XIV (in Spanish). Zaragoza: Institución Fernando el Católico. pp. 31–62. ISBN 978-84-9911-430-9.
