= Patricia Campos =

Patricia Campos may refer to:

- Patricia Campos (pilot) (born 1977), Spanish football coach and naval aviator
- Patrícia Campos Mello, Brazilian journalist
- Patricia Campos (footballer) (born 1987), Salvadoran footballer
- Patricia Campos (field hockey), player for Uruguay at the 2007 Pan American Games
- Patricia Campos, a character on the 2012 telenovela Corazón apasionado
