= Hafsid capture of Alicante =

- Part of Campaigns of Abu Zakariya Yahya
Date	1241
Location	Alicante, Sharq al-Andalus
Result	Hafsid victory

Belligerents
Banu Hud	Hafsid dynasty

Commanders and leaders
Muhammad ibn Hud Baha al-Dawla	Abu Zakariya Yahya; Zayyan ibn Mardanish

Strength
Unknown	Unknown

Casualties and losses
Unknown	Unknown

The Hafsid capture of Alicante was a military intervention attributed to the Hafsid ruler Abu Zakariya Yahya in 1241, during a period of political instability in the eastern territories of al-Andalus. The episode is associated with the rivalry between the Hafsid dynasty and the Banu Hud rulers of Murcia.

== Background ==
On Friday, 15 April 1239, Zayyan ibn Mardanish seized power in Murcia. Between April and May, he sent his envoy, Abu Abdallah ibn Abi Harith, to Tunis to formally acknowledge Hafsid suzerainty. Later, in June 1239, a fleet commissioned by Abu Zakariya Yahya arrived at the port of Cartagena to support Zayyan, whose rule remained unpopular among several cities reluctant to recognize his authority. The cities of Xàtiva, Orihuela, Lorca, and Alzira subsequently acknowledged Hafsid suzerainty.

However, in 1241, Muhammad ibn Hud Baha al-Dawla expelled Zayyan from Murcia and restored the rule of the Banu Hud in al-Andalus. Zayyan consequently appealed to the Hafsid caliph Abu Zakariya Yahya for assistance.

== Expedition ==
In 1241, Muhammad ibn Hud Baha al-Dawla overthrew Zayyan ibn Mardanish, who had previously acknowledged Hafsid suzerainty. The new ruler of Murcia refused to recognize Hafsid authority. In response, the Hafsid ruler Abu Zakariya Yahya reportedly dispatched a fleet to Alicante, which temporarily captured the city before being forced to withdraw shortly afterwards.

== Aftermath ==
The overthrow of Zayyan ibn Mardanish in 1241 marked the restoration of the Banu Hud dynasty in Murcia under Muhammad ibn Hud Baha al-Dawla. Zayyan subsequently withdrew to Alicante, where he maintained his position for several years.

== Sources ==
- De Elpaza, Míkel (1986). Sharq al-Andalus Estudios Árabes (in Spanish). Universidad de Alicante.
- Lafuente, Modesto (1861). Historìa general de España (in Spanish).
- Garrido, Josep-David (2013). La conquesta de Múrcia (PDF) (in Spanish).
