= Bernat Guillem d'Entença =

Catalan noble (1226–1300)

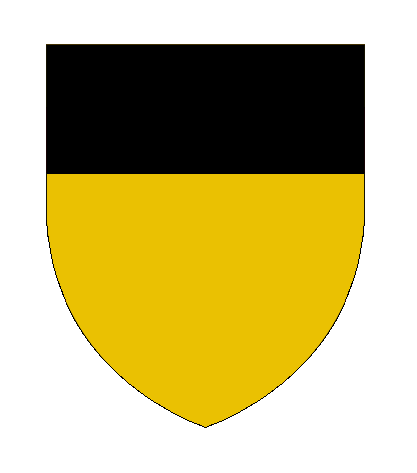
Coat of arms of the House of Entença.

Bernat Guillem d'Entença, also known as Bernat Guillem II d'Entença, was a noble of the Catalan House of Entença, son of Bernat Guillem de Montpeller.

== Biography ==
Bernat Guillem d’Entença was born in 1226. Bernat was a member of the House of Entença. He was the son of Bernat Guillem de Montpeller, also known as Bernat Guillem I d'Entença, and Jusiana d'Entença who were the respective uncle and aunt of James I the Conqueror.

His father, Bernat Guillem de Montpeller, participated in the Conquest of Majorca and Valencia during the Reconquista, and died after the Battle of the Puig in 1238. Bernat Guillem d'Entença, who was 10 or 11 years old, inherited his possessions and was also called to war. Due to his young age, his relatives Berenguer d'Entença and Gombau d'Entença fought in the name of House of Entença instead of him during the rest of the campaign.

After the defeat of the moors in Valencia, the House of Entença achieved important territorial gains. He would marry Alamanda de Sant Martí in 1242, the daughter of an important noble family of New Catalonia, offering her as dowry the towns of Castellnou and Rafals. This increased the social status of his house and reinforced his presence in Valencia.

Between 1250 and 1260 he assisted the Kingdom of Castille with their fight against the moors and he also delimited the border between the Kingdom of Castille and the Crown of Aragon. In 1264 he tried to claim the territory of Montpellier but failed.

He participated in the Conquest of the Kingdom of Murcia from 1265 to 1266 and, in 1273, he protected the border established by the Treaty of Almizra from the Kingdom of Castille. In 1284 he fought in the Siege of Albarracín (1284). He would also participate in the peace treaty between Alfonso II the Chaste and the King Castille in 1289. In 1300 he went to Cyprus, became a hospitaller and died there.

== See also ==
- Bernat II de Cabrera

== Bibliography ==
- Guinot, Enric (1996). "L'alta noblesa catalana en la conquesta de València" [The Catalan high nobility during the conquest of Valencia]. Anuario de Estudios Medievales (in Catalan). 26 (2). Consejo Superior de Investigaciones Cientificas: 647–685. doi:10.3989/aem.1996.v26.i2.664. ISSN 1988-4230.
- "Els barons D'Entença". El castell de Móra D'Ebre (in Catalan). Archived from the original on 3 October 2006.
