= Bernat Guillem de Montpeller =

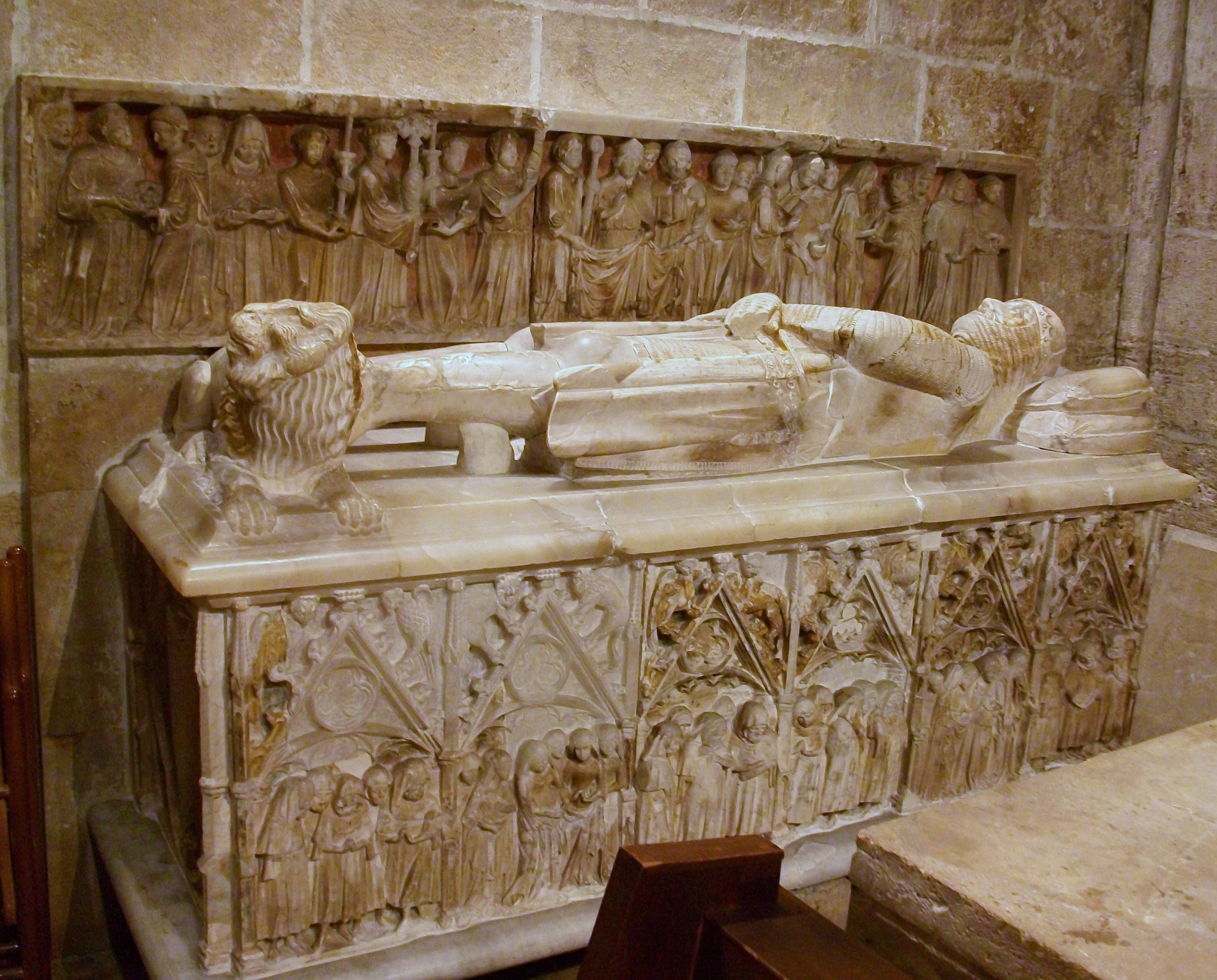
Tomb of Bernat Guillem de Montpeller in the Monastery of Santa Maria.

Bernat Guillem de Montpeller also known as Bernat Guillem I d'Entença (Spanish:Bernardo Guillermo I de Entenza. b. ? - d. El Puig, 1238) was a noble, who married into the Catalan House of Entença. He was the lord of Fraga. He is best known for his participation in the Conquest of Majorca and Valencia during the Reconquista. He died after the Battle of the Puig in 1238.

== Biography ==
Born between 1185 and 1190, he was the fourth son of William VIII of Montpellier, and half-brother of Maria of Montpellier, who later became the mother of King James I of Aragon. In July 1215, he received the barony of Fraga, together with the possession of other castles ceded by his brother, Guillem d'Entença. Previously, parts of Fraga were shared with the Count of Urgell and the Viscount of Béarn. The king returned rent money that had gone to Urgell back to Fraga and Entença in 1215.

He participated with James I of Aragon in the conquests of Mallorca and Valencia. He commanded the king's forces at the Siege of Burriana where he was injured. He died in camp at the Battle of the Puig from wounds received in battle. His son, Bernat Guillem II d'Entença would inherit his possessions.

=== Marriage and children ===
He married Jussiana d’Entença, daughter of Ponç Hug d’Entença. After his marriage, Bernat Guillem de Montpeller became also known as Bernat Guillem I d'Entença, although he was only married to someone from this house.

From his marriage came two sons:

- Bernat Guillem II d’Entença (1226 - around 1300),
- Guillem d'Entença (1227/28 - after 1244).

== Bibliography ==
- Guinot, Enric (1996). "L'alta noblesa catalana en la conquesta de València" [The Catalan high nobility during the conquest of Valencia]. Anuario de Estudios Medievales (in Catalan). 26 (2). Consejo Superior de Investigaciones Cientificas: 647–685. doi:10.3989/aem.1996.v26.i2.664. ISSN 1988-4230.
- "Els barons D'Entença". El castell de Móra D'Ebre (in Catalan). Archived from the original on 3 October 2006.
