= Battle of the Puig =

1237 battle of the Reconquista

Coordinates: 39°35′N 0°18′W

Battle of El Puig de Santa Maria
- Part of the Reconquista (Aragonese Conquest of Valencia)
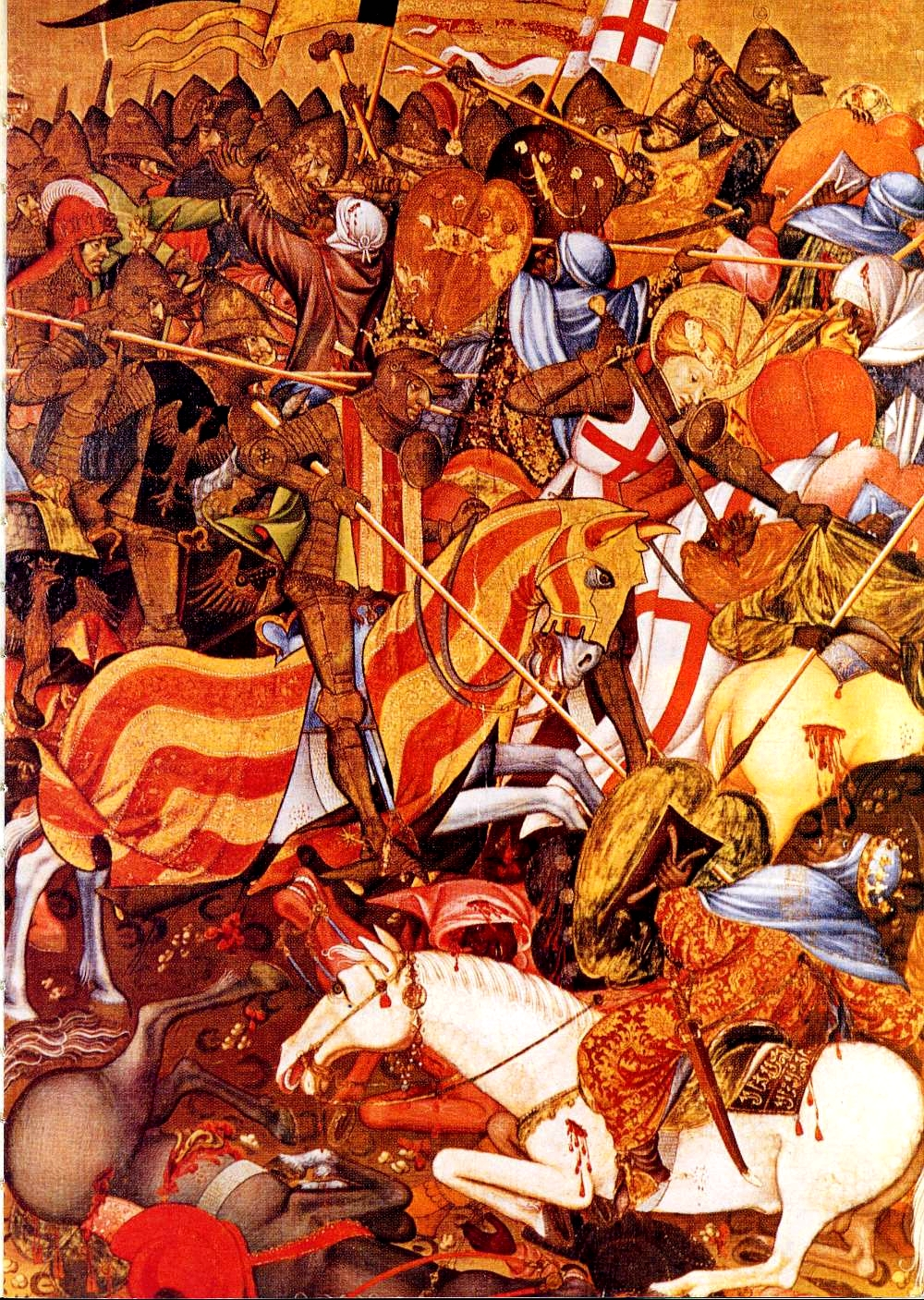
- The Battle of the Puig de Santa Maria (Andrés Marzal de Sas)
Date	15 August 1237
Location	El Puig, Province of Valencia, Spain
Result	Aragonese victory

Belligerents
Crown of Aragon	Taifa of Valencia

Commanders and leaders
Bernat Guillem I d'Entença	Zayyan ibn Mardanish

Strength
50 knights 1,000 foot soldiers	600 cavalry 11,000 foot soldiers Unverified

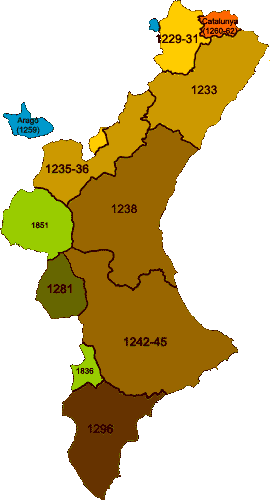
Chronological map of the conquest of Valencia.

The Battle of the Puig, also known as the Battle of the Puig de Santa Maria, the Battle of the Puig de Enesa, and the Battle of the Puig de Cepolla, was one of three major military actions of James I of Aragon in his campaign to take control of the Muslim Taifa of Valencia in the 13th Century. In this battle, Muslim forces led by Zayyan ibn Mardanish were defeated in 1237 when they attempted to eliminate a fortified Argonese position at El Puig 15 kilometers north of the city of Valencia.

== Background ==
For the first 500 years of the Reconquista, the city and territory of Valencia on the eastern coast of the Iberian Peninsula along the Mediterranean Sea had been held and occupied almost exclusively by the Muslims. During that long history, Christian polities had ruled Valencia for only a short 16 year period at the end of the 11th Century.

At the beginning of the 13th Century, the Almohades had successfully integrated the Muslim polities of al-Andalus into a somewhat unstable political entity. In Valencia, the Almohad governors Zayd Abū Abd Allah Muhammad and Zayd Abū Zayd were able to act with complete autonomy, including giving titles of kingship. After the Almohad defeat at the Battle of Las Navas de Tolosa in 1212, however, the empire began to disintegrate and fracture into smaller self-governing Muslim kingdoms.

In 1224 during this period of upheaval, James I called on the nobles from Aragon and Catalonia to initiate the conquest of Valencia. Abū Zayd promptly asked James I for a truce which he accepted in return for one fifth of the income from Valencia and Murcia. During the summer of 1225, James I attempted to take the castle at Peñíscola by laying siege to it, however the siege was ultimately unsuccessful when the Aragonese nobles abandoned the effort.

In 1229, however, the political landscape of Valencia underwent great change. In January of that year, Zayyan ibn Mardanish, a member of a prominent eastern Andalusi Muslim family, displaced Abū Zayd, occupied the capital city, assumed the title of emir, and established an independent Muslim government. In addition, Zayyan repudiated Almohad authority and acknowledged the Abbasid caliph in Baghdad as his religious-political overlord.

Abū Zayd, in turn, fled to the north to seek protection in territory controlled by or allied with Aragon. On 20 April 1229, Abū Zayd concluded a treaty with James I at Calatayud, accepting a subordinate political relationship and promising him one-quarter of the revenues from territories he recovered in Valencia. The agreement also provided for six strategic castles to be placed under the control of Aragonese nobles. As such, the alliance ultimately caused James I to intervene in Valencian affairs and initiate a concerted effort to conquest Valencia.

== Campaign for Valencia ==
The Argonese campaign to take control of Valencia began in earnest in 1231 when Blasco de Alagón, a powerful noble of James I, attacked and captured the castle of Morella, a strong hilltop fortification in the mountainous interior of northern Valencia. Morella served as an administrative and military center for an extensive district containing smaller settlements and fortifications.

In 1233, James I took command of the Aragonese royal army and was successful in capturing a fortified Muslim stronghold at Burriana 55 kilometers north of their capital city. During the next three years, James I secured northern portions of the Muslim territory; expanded into the Alto Palancia region; and organized the manpower, finances, and political backing necessary to attack the city of Valencia.

In 1235, James I conducted military operations in the territory surrounding Valencia, including an unsuccessful attempt to besiege Cullera, which was abandoned when his forces could not obtain suitable stones for their siege engines. On 25 June 1235, James I was conducting a siege of the Tower of Foios, north of Valencia, as established by a contemporary royal charter issued during the operation. In preparation for the expected campaign of James I, Zayyan's forces demolished and abandoned a castle on a hillside overlooking a settlement now known as El Puig de Santa Maria, about 15 kilometers north of Valencia. It is assumed that the castle was destroyed to prevent its use by the advancing Christian army.

On 28 May 1236, James I and Abū Zayd concluded a further agreement at Teruel concerning their continuing political relationship and future territorial acquisitions. Abū Zayd's conversion to Christianity, under the name Vicente Bellvís, is documented in 1236. In October 1236, James I convened the Cortes at Monzón, where preparations for the conquest of Valencia were formalized. On 28 October, he issued a charter at Lleida promising to endow Valencia's future cathedral and distribute lands among those who participated in the conquest.

== Campaign in Palancia ==
After the siege of Burriana and the siege of Cullera, James I positioned himself for the final push into Valencia. In October 1236, James I convened the Cortes at Monzón to organize a new campaign against the Muslim kingdom of Valencia. Pope Gregory IX granted the campaign crusading status in February 1237, and the Christian army assembled at Teruel that spring. The campaign aimed to capture Valencia and extend Christian control over the territory between the Palancia and Júcar river valleys. The establishment of a fortified position at El Puig subsequently provided a base for operations against Valencia.

The Aragonese forces rebuilt the fortifications of El Puig, building a wall of mud and stone that stretched all the way to the sea. After two months, the defensive works were ready and the castle was occupied by a garrison of 100 knights and many more peasants commanded by Bernat Guillem I d'Entença, a relative of the king.

According to the Muslim historian Ibn Khaldun, during September 4—16, the Christians attacked the Saracens, building seven encampments, two of which were concentrated against Valencia, Al-Yazirat Suquar, and Xàtiva. While Castilian forces took the city of Córdoba under the command of the Castilian king, James I took power over the majority of the Castilians in his area of operations. After building a castle at El Puig to facilitate his planned attack of Valencia, he returned home.

== Battle ==
According to James I's Llibre dels fets, Zayyan assembled forces from the region between Xàtiva and Onda and advanced against the Christian garrison at El Puig. The chronicle reports that his army consisted of approximately 600 mounted men and 11,000 infantrymen, although these figures cannot be independently verified. He attacked the Aragonese forces on 15 August 1237. According to the Muslim historian Ahmed Mohammed al-Maqqari, the attack occurred shortly after James I had left El Puig for Huesca.

Ibn al-Abbar, who had been Abū Zayd's secretary when he presided over Valencia, became Zayyan's scribe after Abū Zayd left the city. He recorded the battle as having happened around noon. The Muslim Almohad forces under Zayyan were routed, and a great many of their soldiers were slain in the action. Amongst the Almohad dead was the preacher Aburrebii ibn Salim Elcolaí "the wise". When news reached James I of the victory, he traveled to the site of the battle, where he remained a few days, after which time he returned to Aragon.

This decisive Aragonese victory had a great influence over the overall fight for the control of Valencia. After the battle, the number of Christian forces in the region swelled, forcing many Muslims to flee south.

== Consequences ==
Whilst James I was in Aragon, the commander of the Aragonese army at El Puig, Bernat Guillem I d'Entença, died of wounds received during the action. This greatly disheartened the nobles, especially those of Aragon.

At the council of magnates, Blasco I of Alagonia, speaking on behalf of many other barons, voiced that it would be better to evacuate El Puig and temporarily abandon the gains made during that portion of the campaign.

James I refused to follow the advice of the nobles and proceeded to continue the campaign. The king again returned to El Puig de Santa Maria on 24 January 1238, bringing with him the son of Bernat Guillem d'Entença, who was about 10 to 11 years of age at the time. In front of all the nobles present and the representatives of the military orders, the king knighted Guillem and pronounced him the heir to all the titles and lands of his father. He further provisionally appointed Berenguer de Entenza as a captain of the castle.

The gestures made by the king did little to halt the opposition to the continuation of the campaign. On the contrary, once knowing that the king was en route, a large portion of the garrison at El Puig met secretly and agreed to abandon their position. One of the Dominican friars who resided in the garrison denounced the plot against the king. The following day, he gave a sermon to the nobles of the castle who there after promised to continue the fight until victory.

Once back at El Puig, James I received a message from Zayyan offering all the castles from the Turia River to Tortosa and Teruel, the construction of a lavish palace for the king in Saïda Province and the payment of ten thousand besantes annually in return for James' promise to abandon his attack of the capital. James I of Aragon responded negatively to the offer, citing the changed circumstances, and proceeded with his conquest.
He conquered Valencia after a five-month siege on 28 September 1238.

== Commemoration ==
The Altarpiece of the Centenar de la Ploma (or Altarpiece of Saint George of the Centenar de la Ploma), created around 1400 by Andreu Marçal de Sax and Miquel Alcanyís, commemorates the battle.

== Citations ==
- Alvira Cabrer, Martín (2026). "To Serve both God and King: Bernat Guilhèm de Montpellier (b. 1202–1238) and James I of Aragon". Edad Media. Revista de Historia. 27: 271–321. doi:10.24197/1hfz3245.
- "Arxius Jaume I" (in Catalan). Universitat Jaume I. Document dated 25 June 1235, Foios.
- Balbale, Abigail Krasner (2018). "Affiliation and Ideology at the End of the Almohad Caliphate". Al-Masāq. 30 (3): 266–283. doi:10.1080/09503110.2018.1525241.
- Clari Hidalgo, Pablo (2018). "Els castells de Corbera i de Cullera: de hisn musulmà a castrum cristià". SCRIPTA. Revista Internacional de Literatura i Cultura Medieval i Moderna (in Catalan) (12): 1–12. doi:10.7203/SCRIPTA.12.13662.
- Ferrer i Mallol, Maria Teresa (2011). "Jaume I: vida i gestes" (PDF). In Ferrer i Mallol, Maria Teresa (ed.). Jaume I: commemoració del VIII centenari del naixement de Jaume I (in Catalan). Vol. 1. Barcelona: Institut d'Estudis Catalans. pp. 11–35. ISBN 9788499650869.
- Guichard, Pierre (1990–1991). Les musulmans de Valence et la Reconquête (XIe–XIIIe siècles) (in French). Vol. 1–2. Damascus: Institut français de Damas.
- Hernàndez, Francesc Xavier (2004). "Les Grans Conquestes". Història Militar de Catalunya. Vol. II: Temps de Conquesta (Segunda edición ed.). Rafael Dalmau Editor. p. 102. ISBN 84-232-0655-6.
- Hitchcock, Richard (2014). Muslim Spain Reconsidered: From 711 to 1502. Edinburgh University Press. ISBN 9780748678280.
- James I of Aragon (2000). Gayangos, Pascual de (ed.). The Chronicle of James I, King of Aragon (PDF). Translated by Forster, John. Cambridge, Ontario: In Parentheses Publications.
- Riera, Antoni (2008). "James I and his Era: Brief Analysis of a Major Political and Cultural Inheritance". Catalan Historical Review. 1. Institut d'Estudis Catalans: 9–16. doi:10.2436/20.1000.01.1.
- Utrilla Utrilla, Juan F. (2017). "De la «extremadura» aragonesa al reino de Valencia: las tierras de frontera entre el mundo cristiano feudal y el Sharq al-Andalus (1170–1240)" (PDF). In Sarasa Sánchez, Esteban (ed.). Bajar al reino: relaciones sociales, económicas y comerciales entre Aragón y Valencia (siglos XIII–XV) (in Spanish). Zaragoza: Institución Fernando el Católico. pp. 31–61.
