= Onda, Spain =

Onda
- Town and municipality
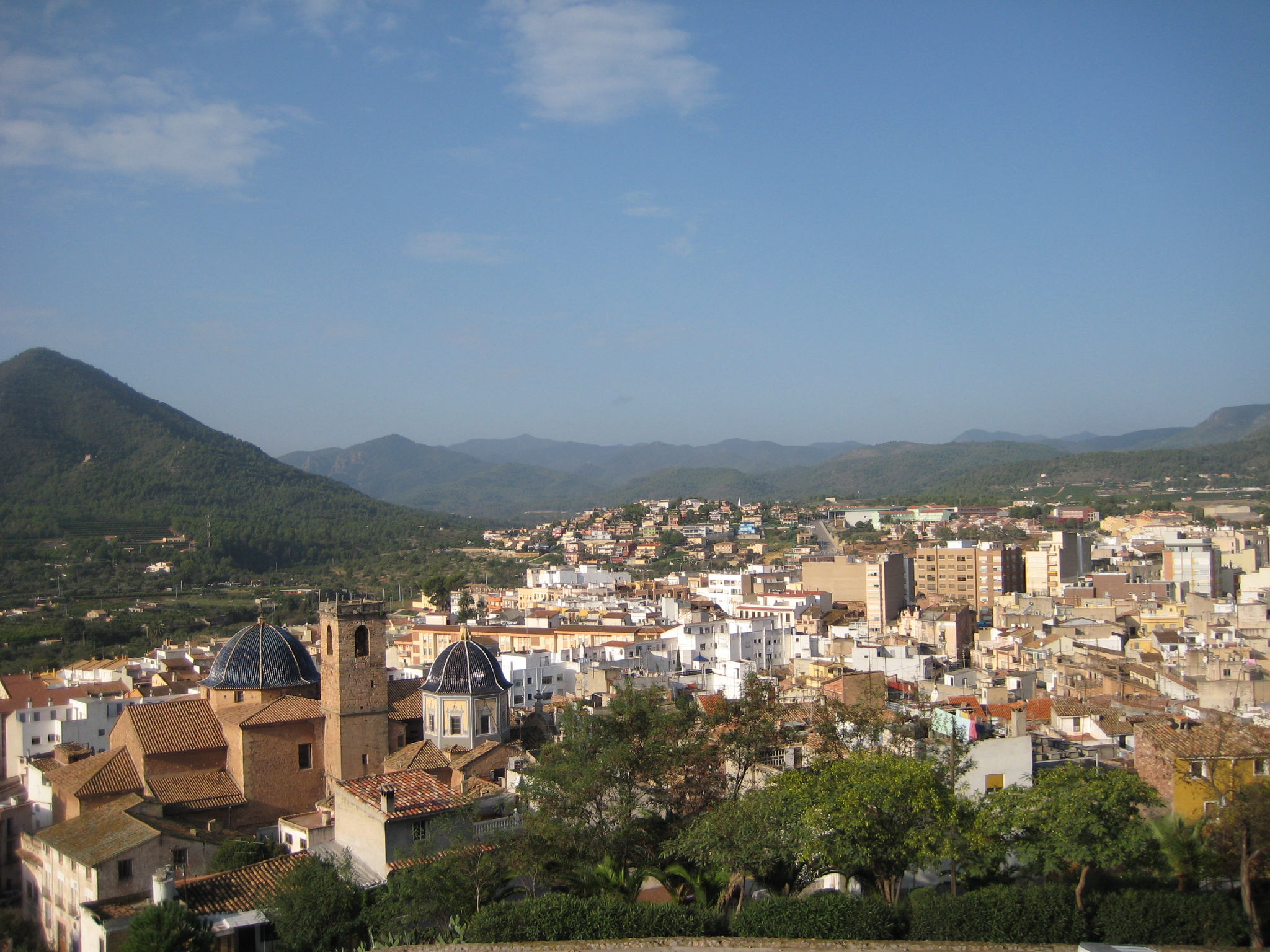
- Onda, panoramic view

- Flag Coat of arms

- Location within Province of Castellón Location within Valencian Community Location within Spain
- Coordinates: 39°57′50″N 0°15′46″W
- Country: Spain
- Autonomous Community: Valencian Community
- Province: Castellón
- Comarca: Plana Baixa

Government
  - Alcaldessa (Mayoress): Carmina Ballester Feliu (PP)

Area
  - Total: 108.42 km^{2} (41.86 sq mi)
- Elevation (AMSL): 194 m (636 ft)

Population (2025-01-01)
  - Total: 26,190
  - Density: 241.6/km^{2} (625.6/sq mi)
- Demonyms: Ondan onder, -a (Val.) ondense (Sp.)
- Official language(s): Valencian; Spanish
- Linguistic area: Valencian
- Time zone: UTC+1 (CET)
  - Summer (DST): UTC+2 (CEST (GMT +2))
- Postal code: 12200
- Area code: +34 + 964
- Website: www.onda.es

Onda (Note: Pronunciation of Onda: Valencian: [ˈonda] Spanish: [ˈonda]) is a town in eastern Spain, in the province of Castelló, part of the autonomous community of Valencia. It has 24,859 inhabitants.

The Sitjar dam, located close to Onda, is an important feature for the irrigation of the nearby fields with water from the Millars River.

== Notable residents ==
- Ibn al-Abbar (1199–1260), poet, diplomat, theologian, and scholar
- Zayyan ibn Mardanish (fl. 1229–1270)
- Vicente Alejandro Guillamón (born 1930), journalist and writer
- Enrique Saura (born 1954), footballer
- José Ramos Castillo (born 1974), Paralympic swimmer
- Patricia Campos Doménech (born 1977), naval aviator and football coach
- Vicente Ballester (born 1980), cyclist
- Víctor Cabedo (1989–2012), cyclist
