= Vicente Alejandro Guillamón =

Spanish journalist and writer (1930–2021)

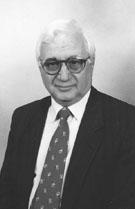
- Born: 4 June 1930; Onda, Castellón, Spain
- Died: 14 January 2021 (aged 90); Collado Villalba, Spain
- Education: technical accounting degree from the Official Schools of Technical Qualified Accountants of Melilla and Málaga; journalism degree from the old Official Journalism School of Madrid
- Occupations: writer and journalist
- Writing career
- Language: Spanish

Vicente Alejandro Guillamón (4 June 1930 – 14 January 2021) was a Spanish journalist and writer.

== Biography ==
Vicente Alejandro Guillamón was born in Onda, Castellon, Spain in 1930, and he was the youngest child of a humble farming and ranching family.

He earned a technical accounting degree from the Official Schools of Technical Qualified Accountants of Melilla and Málaga and a journalism degree from the old Official Journalism School of Madrid. He started his journalism career as a correspondent for the Telegrama del Rif and later worked for the weekly Signo, La Actualidad Económica, the old daily El Alcazar published by PESA, the Mexican news bureau AMEX, and the Spanish news bureau EFE, during 17 years, in different positions, like first managing editor of the newly created local bureau of EFE for the Valencia region (Comunidad Valenciana) and editor of national information. He later became the editor of the religion news magazine Vida Nueva.

In the 1970s, as secondary focus, he taught several classes of Journalism Writing in the newly founded School of Journalism of the University of Valencia. In 1982, he founded the Catholic Union of Media Professionals and Journalists (Unión Católica de Informadores y Periodistas—UCIP), an organization for Catholic journalists and media professionals that includes a considerable number of Spanish professionals in that field.

== Activist ==
In the years of the Francoist regime, he was part of the small group of Christian Democratic activists opposed to the regime. In 1960 he founded, with former members of the Catholic organization JOC (Spanish acronyms of the Catholic Workers Youth), the Unionist Federation of Workers (Federación Sindical de Trabajadores—FST), an underground union of Christian ideals. The union later folded in the Unionist Workers Association (Unión Sindical Obrera—USO). In 1964 Guillamón joined the socialist group that was trying to articulate the Spanish Socialist Party (Partido Socialista Obrero Español—PSOE) of that era. He abandoned the socialist party in 1977 after he became disillusioned with the path taken by this party and his uneasiness with the socialists' Marxism, even if moderate, given his upbringing and personal beliefs rooted in the tradition of the Spanish political and classical liberalism. It is important to notice that his grandfather and father were supporters of the Spanish liberal movement. His grandfather was a supporter of the Liberal Party of Sagasta. His father, born in Santa Fe, Isla de Pinos (Cuba), started as a member of the Liberal Party, with whom he ran and was elected mayor of his small town, Espadilla (Castellón), and later, after the party disappeared during the republican era, joined the Radical Party of Alejandro Leroux.

== Essayist ==
Guillamón wrote several key essays, including:

- Justicia Social , doctrine for syndicalism of Christian base; Pluma, Madrid, 1962.
- La política al desnudo; Pluma, Valencia, 1975, ISBN 978-84-400-9403-2.
- Neopersonalismo Cristiano, A theory for participation in the public life; Editorial San Pablo, Madrid, 1997, ISBN 978-84-285-1931-1. This book was written in an attempt to clarify the contents of "Christian Humanism" and to define the criteria of where is going and how should be Christian participation in public life. Guillamón understands the meaning of person from the Christian point of view, gives to each person individually the supreme dignity, without subordinating one to another, as opposed to what Mounier and Maritain, defended, by saying that the community personalism is like saying that the human acquires its being as part of the group by being a member of the community, instead of by him or herself.
- Prologue and epilogue of the book Diez horas de Estat Catalá: la proclamación del Estado Catalán en octubre de 1934 contada por un testigo ocular, by Enrique de Angulo, Ediciones Encuentro, Madrid, 2005, ISBN 978-84-7490-522-9.
- El caos de la II República, short history of the events that happened before the Spanish Civil War, LibrosLibres, Madrid, 2006, ISBN 978-84-96088-57-3.
- Los masones en el Gobierno de España. LibrosLibres, Madrid, 2009, ISBN 978-84-92654-13-0.
- Defensa Cristiana del Liberalismo. Foreword by Professor Carlos Rodríguez Braun. Editions: De Buena Tinta, 2013, ISBN 978-84-941681-2-3.

== Theatrical career ==
Guillamón was active as a playwright and editor:

- Crónica de sucesos, AAT Asociación de Autores de Teatro, Madrid, 2000, ISBN 978-84-88659-17-0.

== Fiction ==
- Corpus de sangre en Toledo, Ediciones Encuentro, Madrid, 1985, ISBN 978-84-7490-121-4.

== Satirist ==
- Las señoras tienen un gran porvenir por delante ("Women have a great future ahead of them"), Pluma, Alboraya, Valencia, 1977, ISBN 978-84-400-2728-3.

== See also ==
- Personalism
- Humanism
- Christian Democratic
- European People's Party
- Liberalism
