= Altarpiece of the Centenar de la Ploma =

Altarpiece by Spanish painters

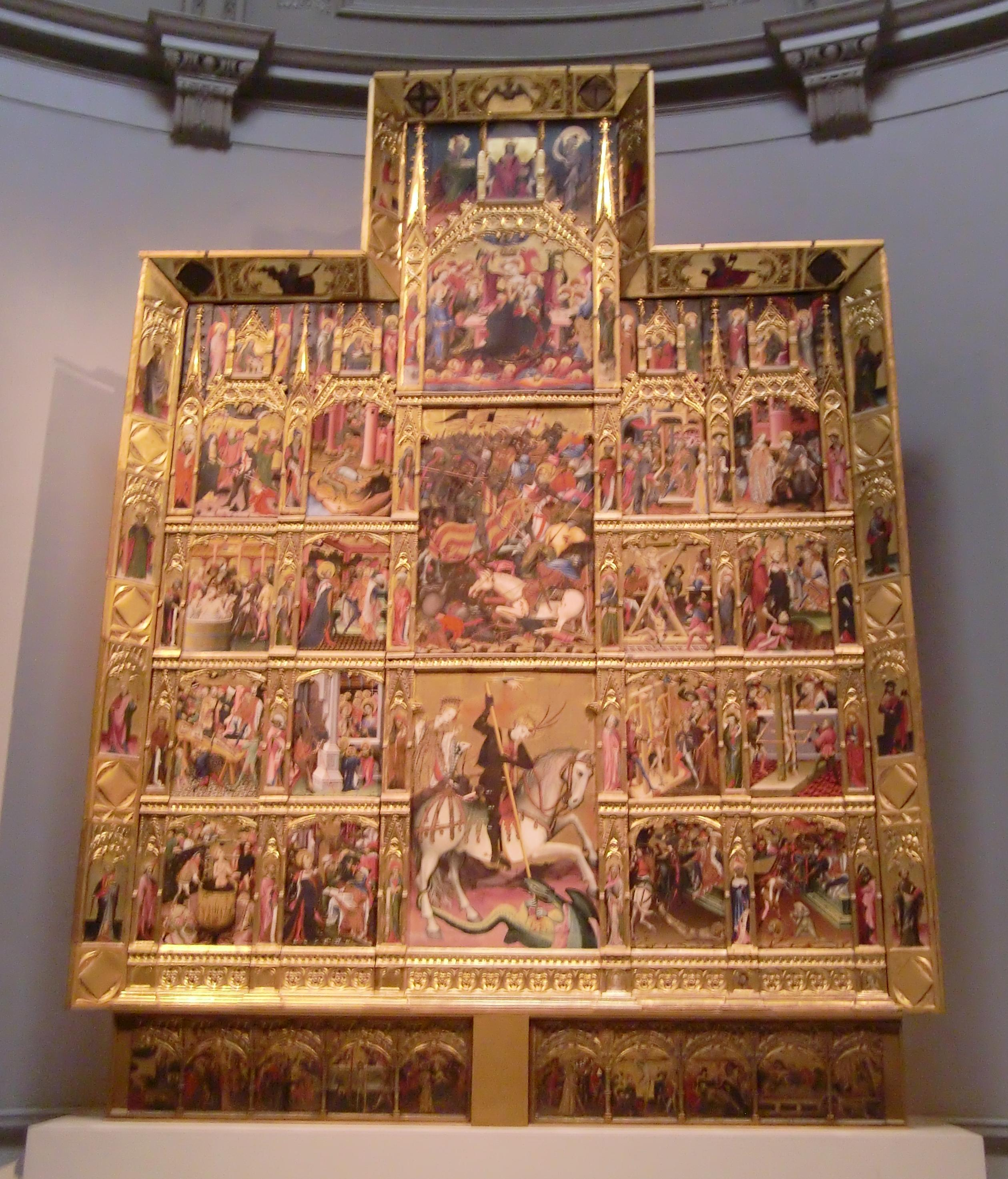

The Altarpiece of the Centenar de la Ploma or Altarpiece of Saint George of the Centenar de la Ploma is a large-scale International Gothic altarpiece executed around 1400 by Andreu Marçal de Sax and Miquel Alcanyís on behalf of the company of the Centenar de la Ploma, symbolising the Battle of the Puig that took place in 1237. Following the acquisition made in 1864, the work is currently in the Victoria and Albert Museum, London.

== Context ==
In 1237, during the conquest of the Taifa of Valencia, King James I of Aragon gained control of the Castle of El Puig. With his troops weakened due to the conquests, he received the warning of a counterattack by the Muslim forces, so he marched towards Catalonia to gather more troops, leaving Guillem Aguiló in charge. In James's absence, the Muslim king Zayyan ibn Mardanish attacked the fortification. During the battle, while part of his troops were fighting the Muslims, Aguiló advanced from behind the hill sounding numerous trumpets and carrying flags taken from nearby ships, with the royal pennant at the head, making the Muslims believe that James was arriving with an army. According to Bernard Desclot's Chronicle, at that moment Saint George appeared with his own army of knights, allowing the Christians to win the battle.

== History ==
On 3 June 1365, Pere the Ceremonious created the militia of the Centenar de la Ploma, initially called the Centenar of the Glorious Sant Jordi. After the Church of Sant Jordi in Valencia was consecrated on 27 May 1401, the Centenary commissioned an altarpiece for this church, which was made sometime between 1400 and 1420. Due to its dimensions and complexity, the work probably had several authors, mainly Marçal de Sax and Miquel Alcanyís, but also very likely Johan Utuvert and Gonçal Peris. In 1740 the altarpiece was still in the church, but it was demolished in 1807 and the altarpiece was lost until it appeared in Paris in 1864, dismantled in several pieces. After a period of negotiation, the altarpiece was bought by the South Kensington museum in London for 800 pounds or 20,000 francs, a high price for a work of this nature at the time. Since then, the altarpiece has been exhibited in that museum, now called the Victoria and Albert Museum.

In 2010, negotiations began with the London museum for a temporary return of the altarpiece to Valencia, but ultimately they did not succeed.

In 2019 the predella of the altarpiece, the part most in need of restoration, arrived at the Museum of Fine Arts in Valencia to be restored and analysed, it remained on display between 2020 and 2021. The restoration lasted for a year and a half and made it possible to recover the original colours and brightness.

== Characteristics ==
The altarpiece measures 6.6 meters high and 5.5 meters wide and is made up of five vertical panels, among which the central one stands out for being the highest and widest. The technique used is tempera on wood and its style is International Gothic.

The side panels narrate the legend of Sant Jordi through 16 scenes: the first scene shows angels dressing Sant Jordi in his armour, the second shows the town being frightened by the dragon and the population offering animals and people to feed him -lo, in the third Saint George meets the king and is asked to save the princess, the fourth is the saint walking the dragon now tamed and submissive, the fifth scene represents the baptism of the royal court after this event, the sixth scene shows the saint denouncing the Roman governor's devotion to pagan symbols, which causes his crucifixion in the following scene, in the eighth he continues his martyrdom by poisoning, and in the ninth we see how his bowels are opened by fill them with salt, the tenth scene shows Jesus appearing at night to comfort Saint George, scenes 11 and 12 show him being tortured with two wheels and sawn in half, in the 13th they put him in molten lead, 14 shows his captors offering him to surrender and accept his gods, when he refuses he is dragged naked down the panel in scene 15 and beheaded in scene 16. The moment when the saint defeats the dragon appears in the lower scene of the central panel, with the princess watching in the background. The scene above this one shows the Battle of El Puig, the two main characters are James I killing Zayyan (although James I was not present at the battle or engaged with the Muslim king) and Saint George King James and his horse wear the colours of the royal ensign, while Sant Jordi wears the clothing of the Centenary of the Feather. In the background, the rest of the knights arriving at the battle carrying several flags can be seen, among them the royal pennant and a flag with an eagle with open wings typical of Guillem d'Aguiló. The upper central scene shows an image of the Virgin Mary surrounded by angels. Each of the side panels is headed by one of the evangelists, while the central one is headed by Christ. In the alleys, there are twenty-five prophets and on the dust cover or bracelet the twelve apostles, in the upper central part of the dust cover appears the dove of the Holy Spirit, with the cross of Saint George on one side and a crossbow on the 'other, in reference to the Centenar de la Ploma militia that paid for the altarpiece. Finally, at the base is the predella, where ten scenes of the Passion are represented: the Oration in the Garden, the Betrayal, the Rapture, the Flagellation, the encounter with Caiaphas, the Way to Calvary with the cross, Crucifixion, Descent, Lamentation, and Resurrection, the side scenes are partially cut out and in the center there is a space where the tabernacle was probably located.

== Gallery ==
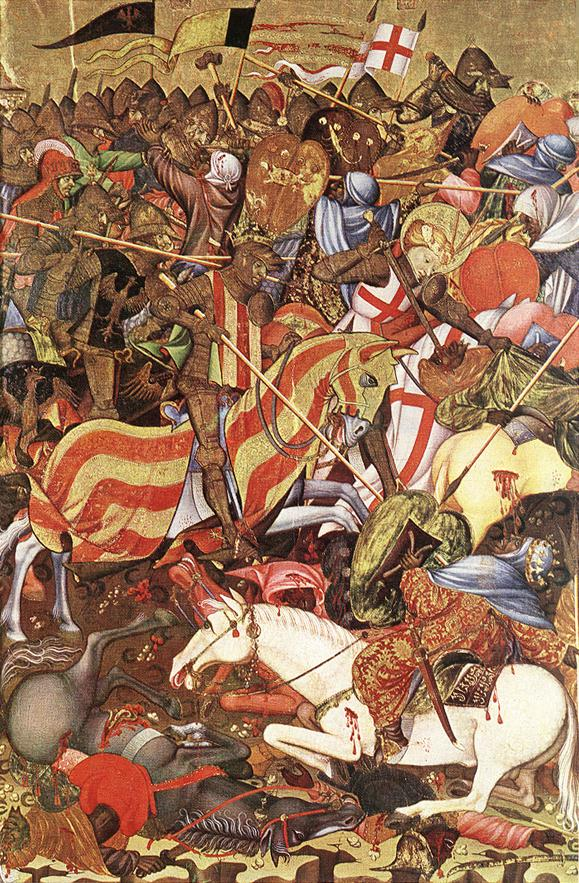
Central scene depicting the Battle of Puig

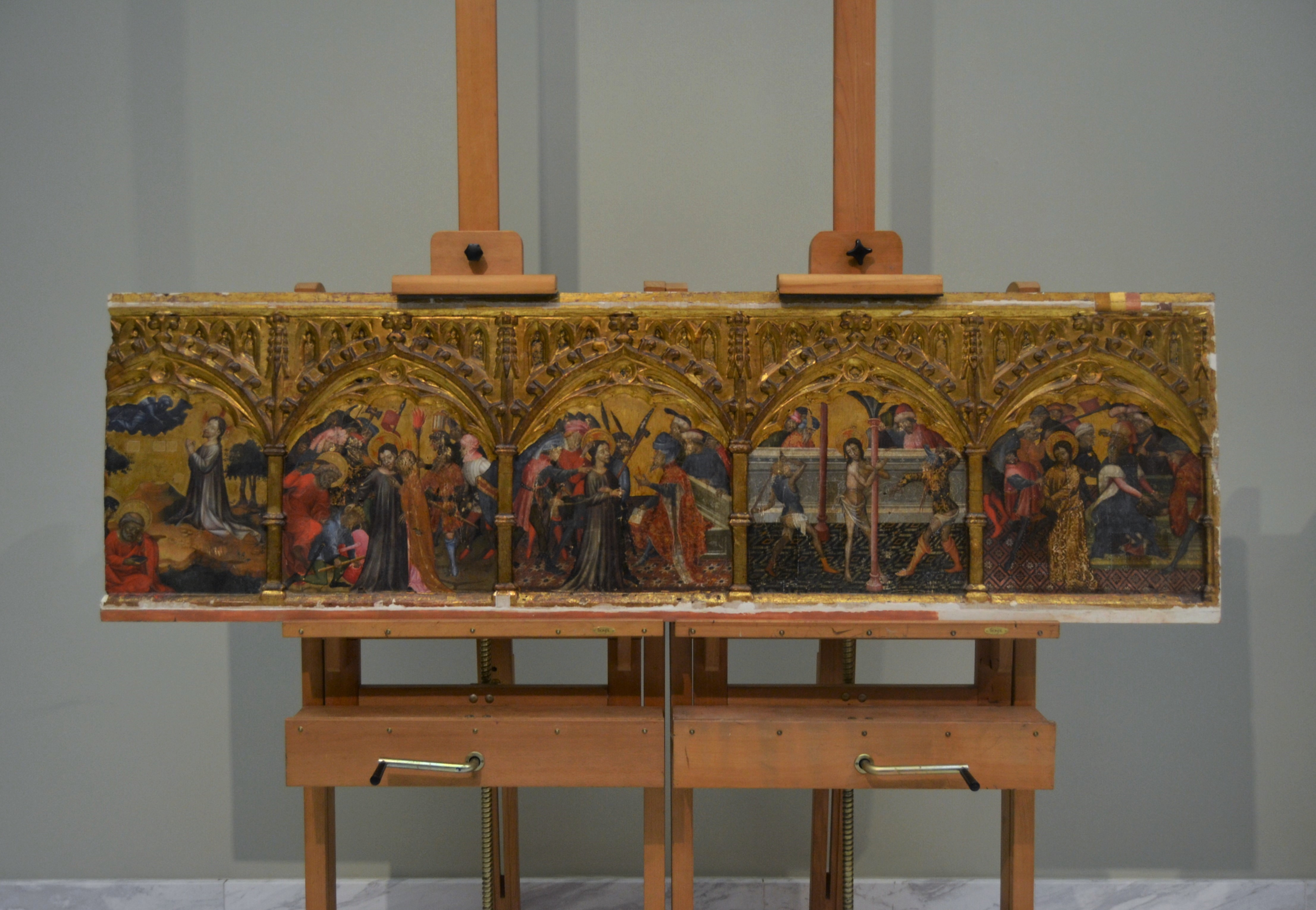
Left side of the predella

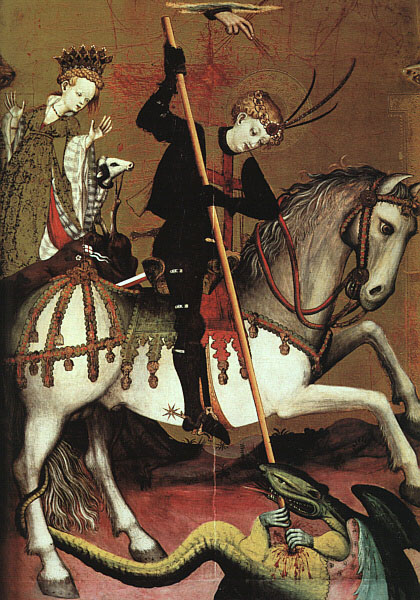
Lower central scene depicting Saint George defeating the dragon

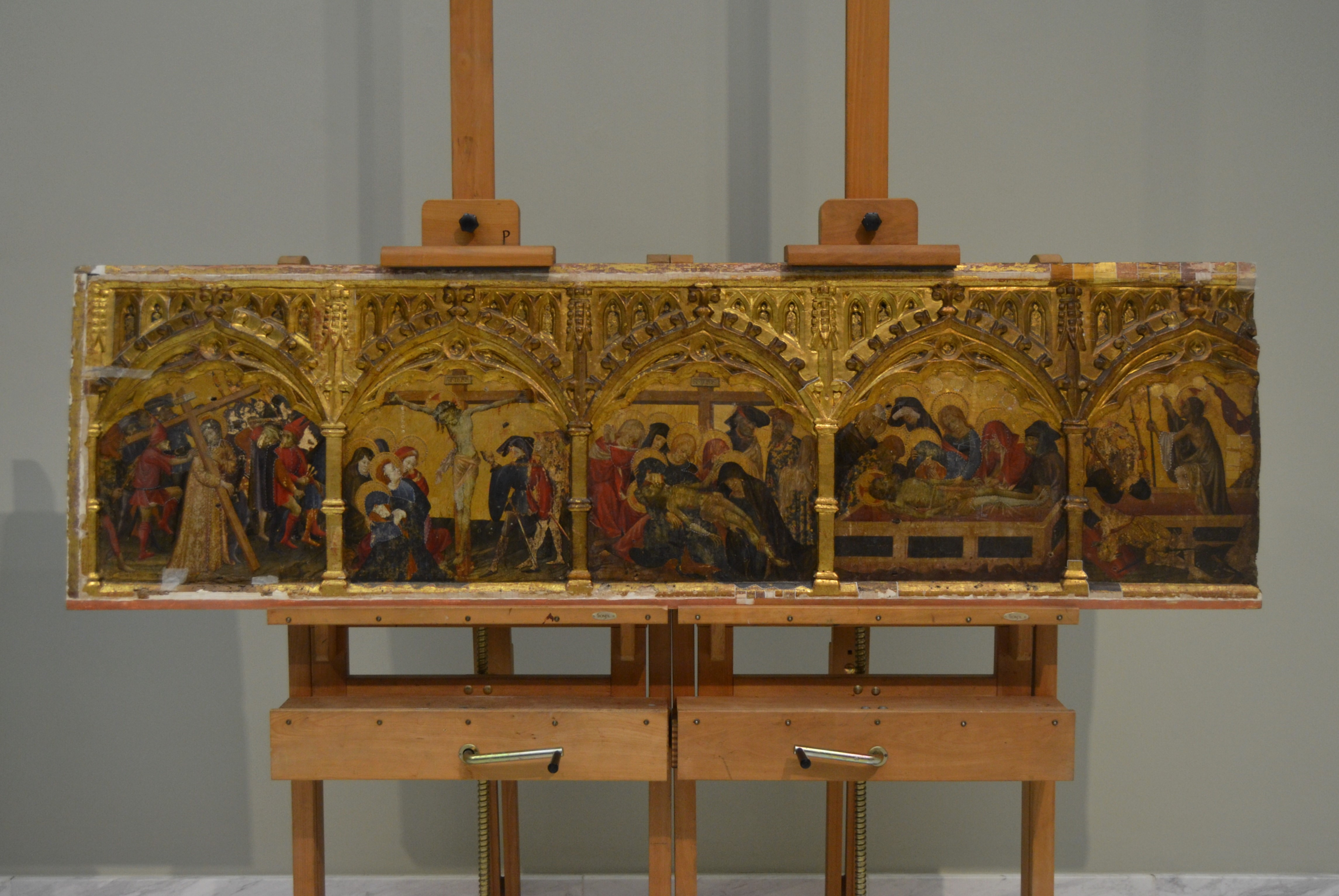
Right side of the predella

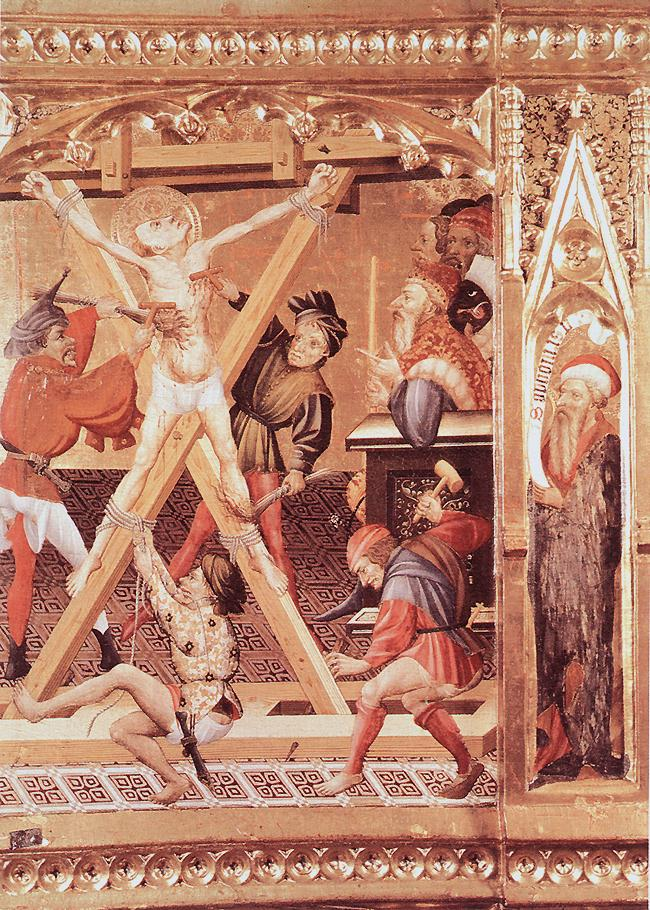
Detail of the crucifixion of Saint George
