= Patricia Campos (pilot) =

Spanish association football coach and former aviator of the Spanish Navy

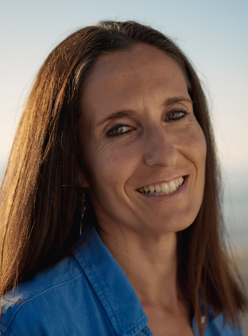
- Born: Patricia Campos Doménech; 12 March 1977 (age 49); Onda, Spain
- Education: University of Valencia
- Occupations: Naval aviator, coach, writer, accountant

Patricia Campos Doménech (born 12 March 1977) is a Spanish association football coach and former aviator of the Spanish Navy. She is the Navy's first woman fighter pilot. In 2013, she left the Armed Forces and publicly came out as a lesbian in an autobiographical book.

== Biography ==
Patricia Campos Doménech was born in Onda, Castellón on 12 March 1977. After studying audiovisual communication at the University of Valencia, she took public exams for the Spanish Navy, through which she obtained one of two fighter pilot positions, finishing above about 200 other applicants. In this role, she served as a pilot for VIPs, from high-ranking military officers to the Spanish royal family.

After eight years as an aviator in the Spanish Armed Forces, she left them in May 2013, after deciding that she did not want to continue hiding that she was a lesbian, and considering that her military life was not compatible with her sexual orientation. She chose to dedicate herself to her other interest, football. She had played this in her university days, and was captain of the women's team at Naval Station Rota, where she was assigned. Consequently, she decided to work as a professional football coach, becoming one of the first women to coach a team at a professional level: Carlsbad United F.C. in the United States. She periodically travels to Uganda, where she participates in several projects for the empowerment of children and women, coaching various amateur teams.

As of 2017, she resides in Hawaii. There, she serves as coach of the Honolulu Bulls Soccer Club women's team, and also works mornings in the finance department of the University of Hawaii. She posted weekly entries about her personal experiences in the blog Fútbol sin Fronteras (Football Without Borders).

== Activism for LGBT rights ==
While in the Navy she did not reveal that she was a lesbian until she "freed herself", as she explains in her book Tierra, mar y aire, in which she demands rights for women and the LGBT community. When her sexuality became publicly known, she affirms that despite not being in the military, she had to endure comments from her colleagues, their attitudes and criticisms, and that she was watched much more closely than they were, just for being a woman. It was a "very personal and very thought out" decision that she made, she adds, because she believed that it was a way to help other girls in her situation.

== Awards ==
In 2016, Campos Doménech won the Miki Roqué Award for Peace in Sport for her work in Uganda, where she was a coach of children's teams of the association Soccer Without Borders.

Also in 2016 she received the 2015 Seny Onder Award, an honor promoted by the Cultural and Mercantile Association, for her achievements in life and her actions for solidarity.

She has also won the 2008 Women in Aviation Award from the Association of American Women Pilots in Italy, the 2010 Woman of the Year from the Onda Progressive Women's Association, the 2012 Isabel Ferrer Award from the Generalitat Valenciana, special mention for 2014 Sports Merit from the Castellón Sports Press Association, the Altruism Award from Cadena SER's El Larguero Foundation, and was named a 2015 Woman of Achievement by the United Nations' Beijing Platform for Action.

== Publications ==
- Tierra, mar y aire, Roca Editorial, ISBN 9788416498123
