= Conquest of Valencia (1238) =

1238 battle in Valencia

- Part of the Reconquista (Aragonese Conquest of Valencia)
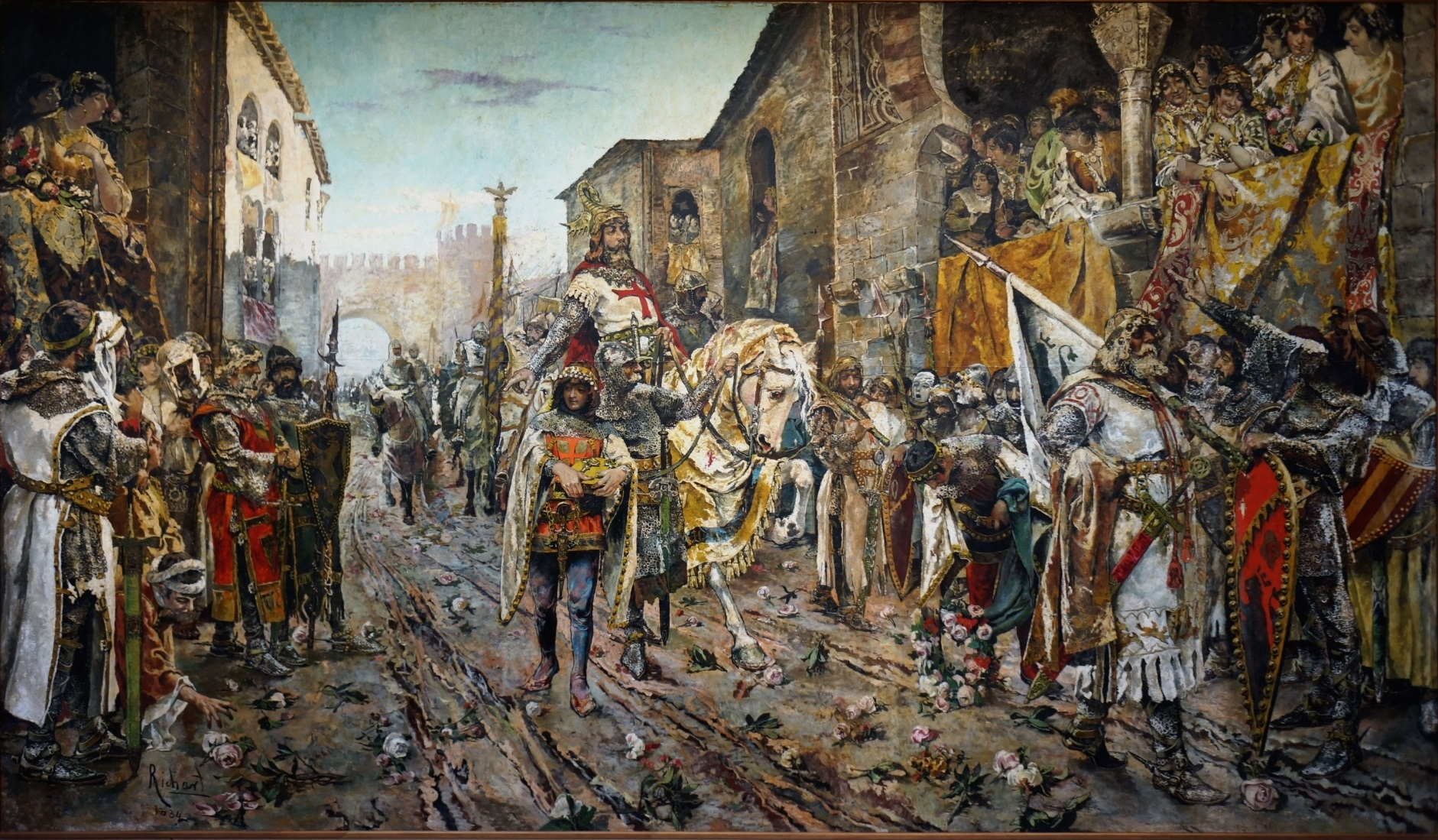
- The Triumphal entry of King James the Conqueror in Valencia (1238) (Museo Del Prado, Madrid)
| Date | 22 April – 9 October 1238 |
| Location | City of Valencia, Spain |
| Result | Crown of Aragon victory |

Belligerents
| Crown of Aragon | Taifa of Valencia |

Commanders and leaders
| James I of Aragon | Zayyan ibn Mardanish |

The conquest of Valencia by the Catalan and Aragonese troops of King James I of Aragon took place on 9 October 1238.

== Background ==
Valencia was under Islamic rule since 711, with an eight-year interruption between 1094, when the city had been conquered by the Christians under command of El Cid, and 1102, when it was retaken by the Almoravids.

In 1229, Valencia (Balànsia) fell into the hands of local leader Zayyan ibn Mardanish, after dethroning Zayd Abu Zayd, the last Almohad governor of the province. Zayd Abu Zayd fled to Aragon, where he became a vassal of King James I of Aragon, who could now represent the conquest of Valencia as a mere intervention in the civil war of the Muslims.

In 1233, two knights, the Occitan Hug de Follalquer, a master of the Knights Hospitaller, and the Aragonese Blasco I d'Alagón, who had just returned from a few years of exile in Balànsia, informed the young King James I, about the riches in the Muslim Taifa of Valencia and they encouraged him to conquer it.
It was decided that the campaign would begin with the conquest of Burriana in the same year 1233. Three years after conquering Burriana and all the territories north of this city, El Puig was conquered in a battle led by Bernat Guillem de Montpeller, uncle of King James I, in the spring of 1236, and fortified.

As El Puig is the key position for the Horta of Valencia and the northern access to the city, Zayyan ibn Mardanish gathered a large army in order to reconquer it, but was defeated in the memorable Battle of El Puig on 20 August 1237, in which James I did not take part because he was in Lleida.
The Aragonese army could now advance towards the city of Valencia.

== The Siege ==
On 22 April 1238, James I arrived at the village Grau de Valencia to start the siege of the city, and established his command post at Russafa. Numerous knights from Aragon, Catalonia, Provence, and also Germany, Hungary, Italy, England, etc. joined the siege, after calls by the King and the Crusade bull granted by Pope Gregory IX in February 1237. In the middle of 1238 the then Archbishop of Tarragona, Pere d'Albalat, assisted James I by offering his personal services in the crusade against the city of Balasinya, in addition to contributing 5,000 marks of silver to the cause, as well as a considerable contingent of knights. His brother Benet d'Albalat, noble and knight, was officially named the commander of the troops.

Zayyan ibn Mardanish, seeing himself surrounded by Christian troops, asked the other Muslim sovereigns for help, but only Abu Zakariya Yahya, King of Tunis, to whom Ibn al-Abbar had been sent, reacted and sent a fleet of twelve ships to Balânsia. On 17 August 1237, the fleet arrived in Balànsia, but they did dare to disembark, because the wall was already attacked and shelled by the Aragonese.
Since food was scarce in the city, Zayyan, having lost all hope of relief, began negotiations for surrendering the city to James I. Balànsia, which had resisted the Cid for two years in 1092–1094, now only endured the attack by James I for five months, but he was provided with better siege weapons.

On 22 September, the capitulation was signed with the decisive intervention of Violant of Hungary, wife of James I, in setting up the conditions for the surrender. Zayyan and the Muslims who wanted to leave could do so south of the Júcar river and the Moors who wanted to stay could do so safely, but under Christian rule. To make the capitulation public, on 28 September 1238, the Valencian Moors hoisted a Royal flag of Aragon and Catalonia, later called the Pennon of the Conquest, on the tower of Alí Bufat. On Saturday 9 October 1238, James I officially took possession and entered the city.

Today, 9 October is still celebrated as the Dia de la Comunitat Valenciana, the official holiday of the Valencian Community.

== Consequences ==
Once the Islamic Balânsia was captured, Pere d'Albalat consecrated the mosque into a Christian church and helped Berenguer de Castellbisbal in the organization of the new Bishopric of Valencia. In this way, Pere d'Albalat managed to have the See of Valencia declared suffragan of that of Tarragona, in direct opposition to the pretensions of the Castilian Archbishop of Toledo, Rodrigo Jiménez de Rada.

After the Christian victory, the city was divided among those who had participated in the conquest, which is evidenced in the Llibre del Repartiment (Book of Distribution). James I granted the city new laws, the Furs of Valencia, which years later extended to the entire Kingdom of Valencia. Thus began a new stage, at the hands of a new society and a new language, Catalan, which established the foundations of the Valencian people as we know them today. Although an estimated 50,000 Muslims left the city and were replaced by some 30,000 mostly Catalan settlers, the large majority of the population remained Muslim for a long period of time.

From 1239 to 1245, James I of Aragon continued with the conquest of the southern part of the Kingdom. Cullera fell in 1240, Alzira in 1242, Xàtiva in 1244 and Biar in 1245. James I of Aragon could not advance further south, as the coastal Taifa of Murcia had already been taken by King Ferdinand III of Castile in 1243. In 1266, he did reconquer Murcia on behalf of his ally Alfonso X of Castile, after the Mudéjar revolt of 1264–1266.
