= Andrés Marzal de Sas =

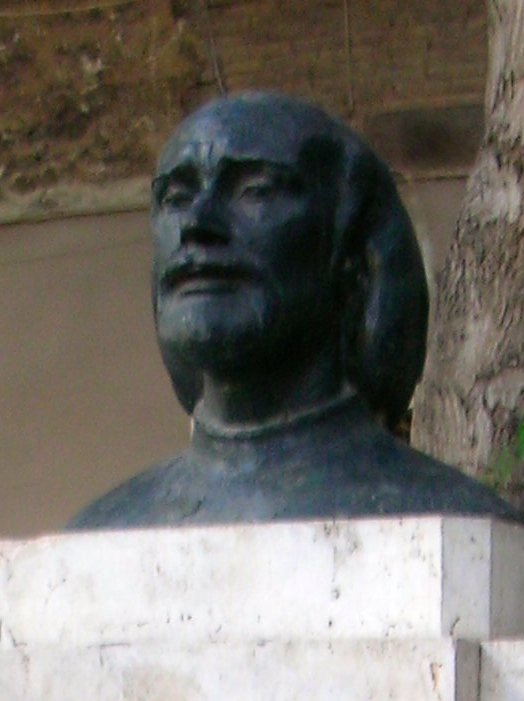
Marzal de Sas; bust by Rafael Pérez Contel, in Valencia

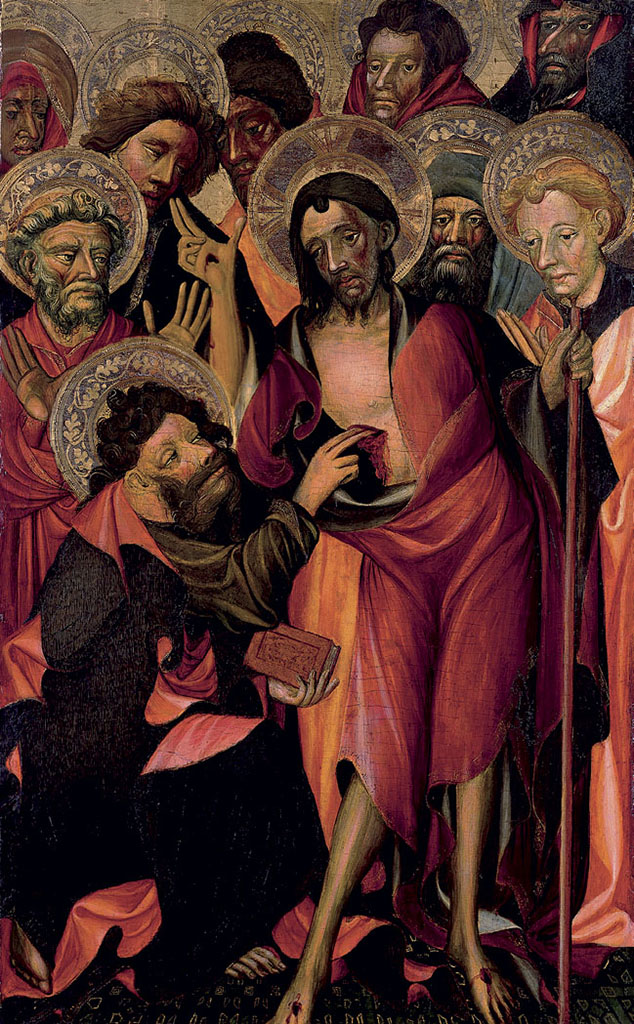
The Incredulity of Saint Thomas (Doubting Thomas)

Andrés Marzal de Sas, or Andreu Marçal de Sax (fl. 1390–1410) was a painter of Dutch origin who worked in Valencia. Based on his name, he was from Sas van Gent, although some sources indicate he may have been from Saxony. Between 1393 and 1399, he collaborated with Pere Nicolau. His only documented work is a "Doubting Thomas", now in the museum of Valencia Cathedral.

== Life and work ==
Together with Pere Nicolau, he is considered to be a major representative of the International Gothic style and helped introduce Early Netherlandish painting to Spain. He also worked with Guerau Gener from 1405 to 1407, and with Gonçal Peris Sarrià, in 1405, for a Nativity altarpiece. His influence on Gener is apparent in the Gothic altarpiece of Santes Creus, which Gener painted with Lluís Borrassà.

Some art historians have tentatively credited him with the "Altarpiece of Saint George" also known as the "Centenar de la Ploma", after a guard of crossbowmen, organized in 1365 by King Peter IV of Aragon, as an escort for the official banners of Valencia. The altarpiece also depicted the Battle of the Puig. That panel, dated c.1400, is now preserved at the Victoria and Albert Museum. It has also been suggested that he was merely a collaborator and that the central panels were largely the work of Miguel Alcañiz.

A document from 1410 indicates that he was awarded a pension by the City Council, as he had become ill and fallen into poverty.
