= Zayd Abu Zayd =

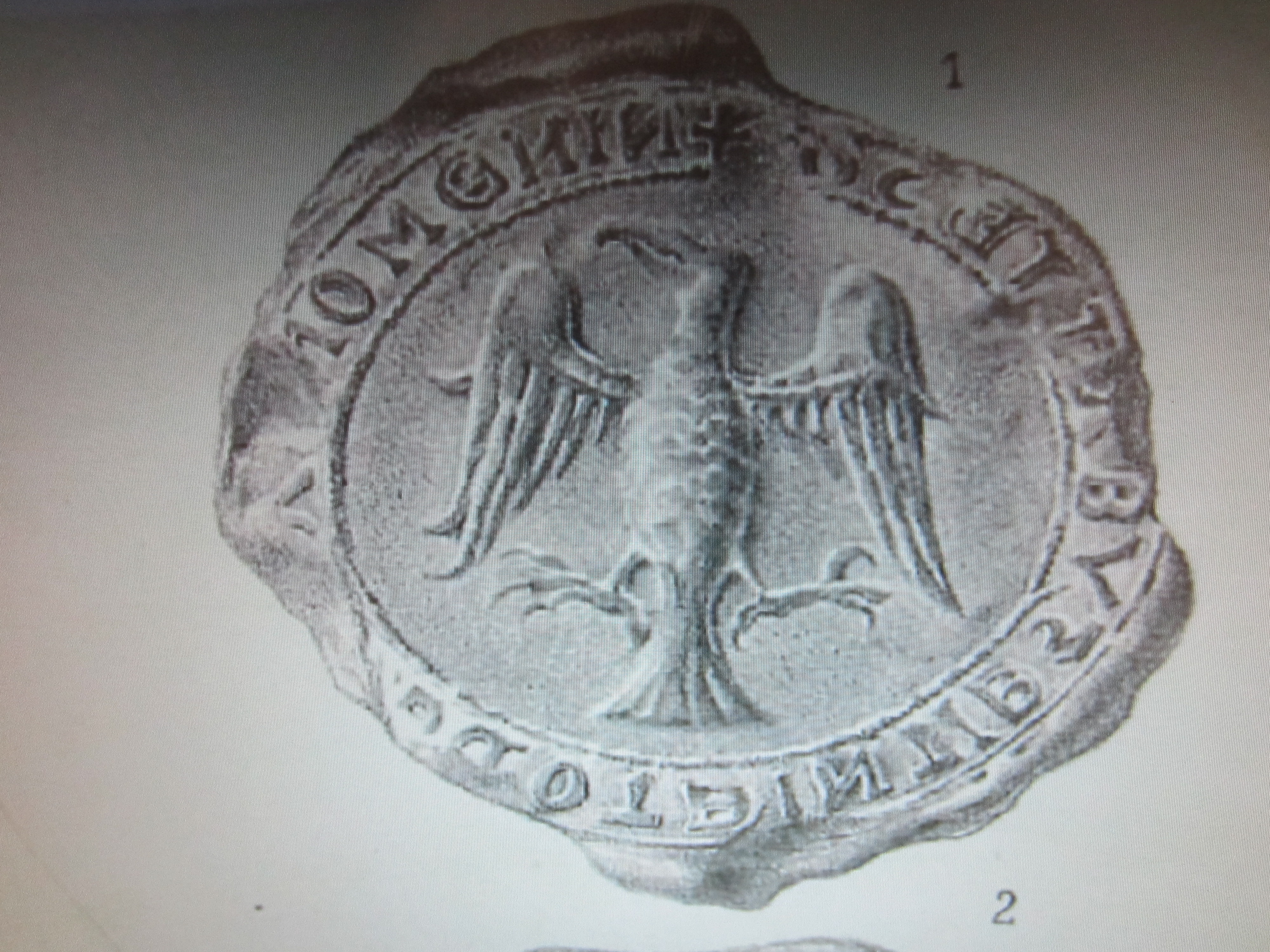
Coin of Abu Zayd

Zayd Abu Zayd (Arabic: ابو زيد, c. 1195 – 1265/1270) was the last Almohad governor of Valencia.

He succeeded as governor of Valencia to his uncle Abū 'Abd Allāh Muhammad. At the death of the Almohad caliph Yaqub al-Mansur, he gained complete autonomy thanks to dynastic struggle that ensued. However, due to its position surrounded by enemies, in 1225 he decided to declare himself a vassal of King James I of Aragon. In 1227 he recognized Idris al-Ma'mun, former governor of Córdoba and Seville, as legitimate Almohad caliph. Two years later, after having been expelled from the Taifa of Valencia (Balensiya) by Zayyan ibn Mardanish, he fled to Aragon, where he obtained by James the right to invade the Muslim territory of Valencia.

Abu Zayd remained a loyal ally of James I, and in 1236 he converted to Christianity, adopting the name of Vicent Bellvis, a fact which he however kept secret until the Conquest of Valencia by Christian forces. He was baptized as a Catholic and married to Isabella Roldán, daughter of Martin Roldán and his wife María López de Luna and became the progenitor of the family with the surname Bellvis. He had a son named Fernando with his wife Isabella Roldán. Under the protection of the Christian king, he held the seigniory over several localities in the Sierra de Espadán, which were inherited by his son Fernando after his death.

== See also ==
- Taifa of Valencia
