= Zayyan ibn Mardanish =

Valencian king

Zayyan ibn Mardanish or Zayán Ibn Mardanix (b. ?, Onda – d. 1270, Tunisia) also known as Zahén or Çaèn, was the last king of the Taifa of Valencia before it fell to the Kingdom of Aragon in the Reconquista campaign led by James I of Aragon.

== Biography ==
In 1229, Zayyan became King of Valencia or Balensiya after dethroning Zayd Abu Zayd, the last Almohad governor of the province. Abu Zayd, who had converted to Christianity, fled the city and became a vassal of the Aragonese king, James I. The dethroned monarch provided James I with the perfect casus belli to invade and conquer Valencia, a process that was completed in the year 1238.

Zayyan personally commanded troops various battles throughout the campaign, including the Siege of Burriana and the Battle of the Puig, where the Muslim troops were decisively defeated, marking the inevitability of the Aragonese take over. After the Battle of the Puig, Zayyan defended the city of Valencia until it fell in 1238. The Muslim hand was forced into surrender due to a lack of aid that was expected from the Sultan of Tunisia. In the accords of the capitulation, Zayyan promised James I that he and his entourage would go into exile from Valencian land via the port at Cullera to Tunisia where he would eventually die.

== See also ==
- List of Valencian monarchs
- Taifa of Valencia
- James I of Aragon
