= Siege of Seville =

1248 battle of the Spanish Reconquista

Coordinates: 37.3783°N 5.9958°W

- Part of the Reconquista and Almohad wars in the Iberian Peninsula
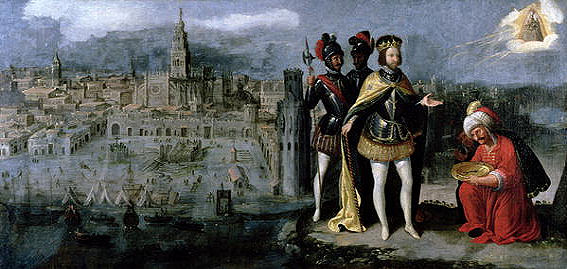
- The Torre del Oro (at right) anchored one end of the barricade in the Guadalquivir. It marks where the Moorish defenses spanned the river.
Date	17 July 1247 – 28 November 1248
Location	Seville
Result	Castilian victory
Territorial changes	Castilian conquest of Seville

Belligerents
Kingdom of Castile; Order of Santiago	Almohad Caliphate

Commanders and leaders
Ferdinand III of Castile; Ramón de Bonifaz	Axataf

Strength
Around 30,000	Around 5,000 – 15,000

Casualties and losses
Unknown	Unknown

The siege of Seville (July 1247 – November 1248) was a 16-month successful investment during the Reconquista of Seville by forces of Ferdinand III of Castile. Although perhaps eclipsed in geopolitical importance by the rapid capture of Córdoba in 1236, which sent a shockwave through the Muslim world, the siege of Seville was nonetheless the most complex military operation undertaken by Fernando III. It is also the last major operation of the Early Reconquista. The operation also marked the appearance of indigenous naval forces of Castile-León of military significance. In effect, Ramón de Bonifaz was the first admiral of Castile, although he never held an official title of that kind.

== Background ==
In 1246, after the conquest of Jaén, Seville and Granada were the only major cities in the Iberian Peninsula that had not acquiesced to Christian suzerainty. Of the two, Granada would remain semi-independent until 1492.

== Siege ==
During the summer of 1247, Castilian armies isolated the city to the north and east. This paved the way for the siege, which started when Ramón de Bonifaz sailed with thirteen galleys, accompanied by some smaller ships, up the Guadalquivir and scattered some forty smaller vessels trying to oppose him. On 3 May the Castilian fleet broke the pontoon bridge linking Seville and Triana.

St Albertus Magnus wrote that the Moorish defenders used artillery loaded with rocks in the siege, but this is not certain that is describing the type of firearms.

Due to a famine, the city capitulated on 23 November 1248. The terms specified that the Castilian troops would be allowed to enter the alcázar no later than a month later. Ferdinand made his triumphant entry into the city on 22 December 1248. Muslim chronicles record that some 300,000 inhabitants left the city. This number is considered exaggerated by O'Callaghan.
