= Castle of Almodóvar del Río =

Castle in Province of Córdoba, Spain

Castillo de Almodóvar del Río
- Almodóvar del Río (Córdoba) in Spain
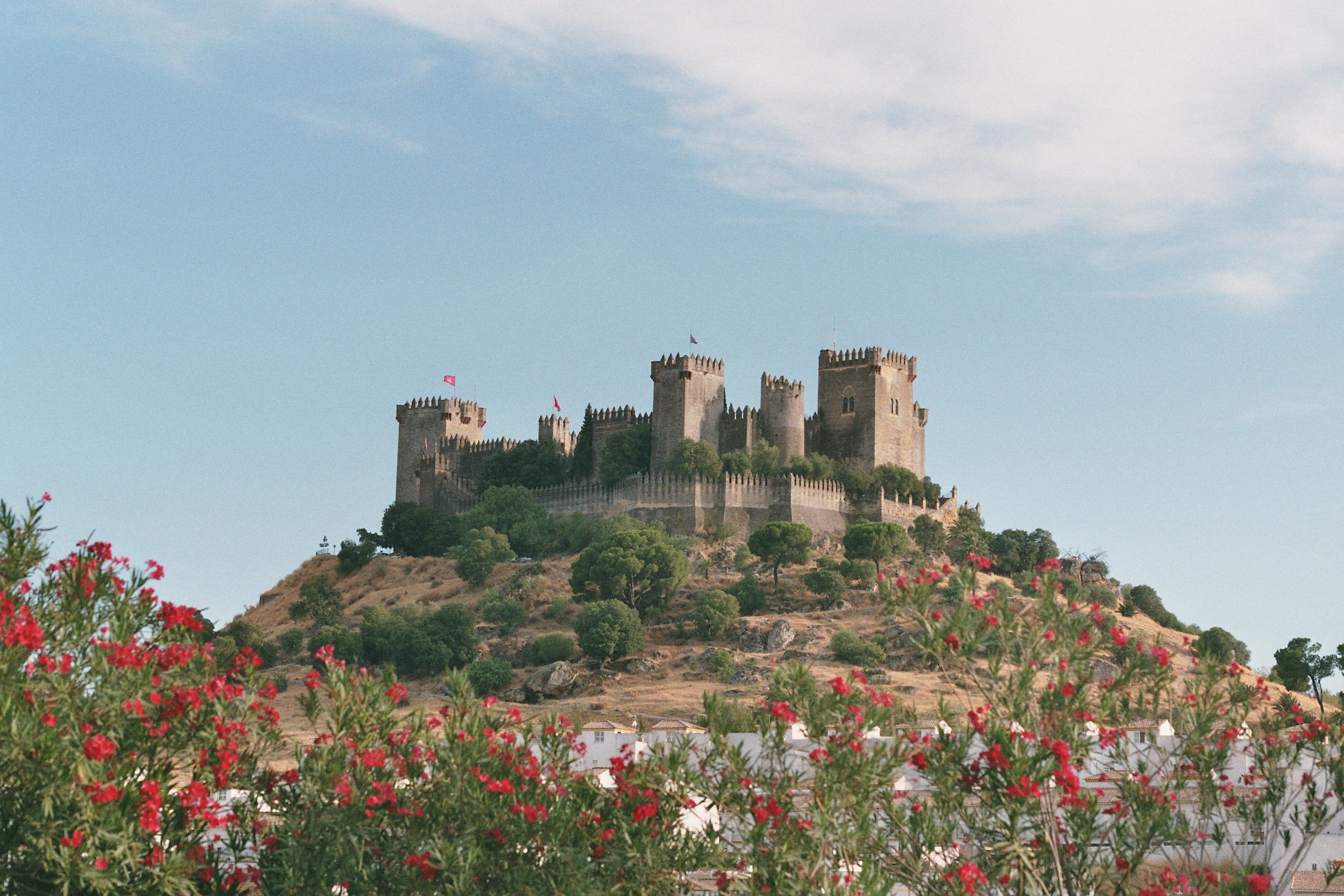
- Castillo de Almodóvar del Río

Site information
- Type: Castle
- Open to the public: Yes
- Condition: Restored in the 14th century by Alfonso XI and restored again between 1901 and 1936 by Rafael Desmaissieres, 12th Count of Torralva
- Website: castillodealmodovar.com

Location
- Coordinates: 37°48′26″N 5°1′25″W

Site history
- Built: 8th century
- Built by: Emirate of Córdoba
- Events: Royal residence of Pedro I and Enrique II in the 14th century

Castillo de Almodóvar del Río (Hisnu-l-mudawar; "the round castle") is a castle of Arab Muslim origin in the town of Almodóvar del Río, Province of Córdoba, Spain. Previously a Roman fort, the current structure is of Arab Umayyad origin, in the year 760. During the Middle Ages, it underwent several renovations and reconstructions. Between 1901 and 1936, it was restored by the owner Raphael Desmaissiers, 12th Count of Torravala, under the technical direction of the architect Adolfo Fernández Casanova. The most important towers are the Cuadrada, the Redonda, and the Homenaje.

It is situated 15 miles (24 km) from Córdoba, on the left bank of the Guadalquivir.

Part of the 7th season of the HBO series Game of Thrones was filmed at the castle. It depicted House Tyrell's home Highgarden, and also parts of Casterly Rock, the ancestral home of House Lannister.

== Gallery ==
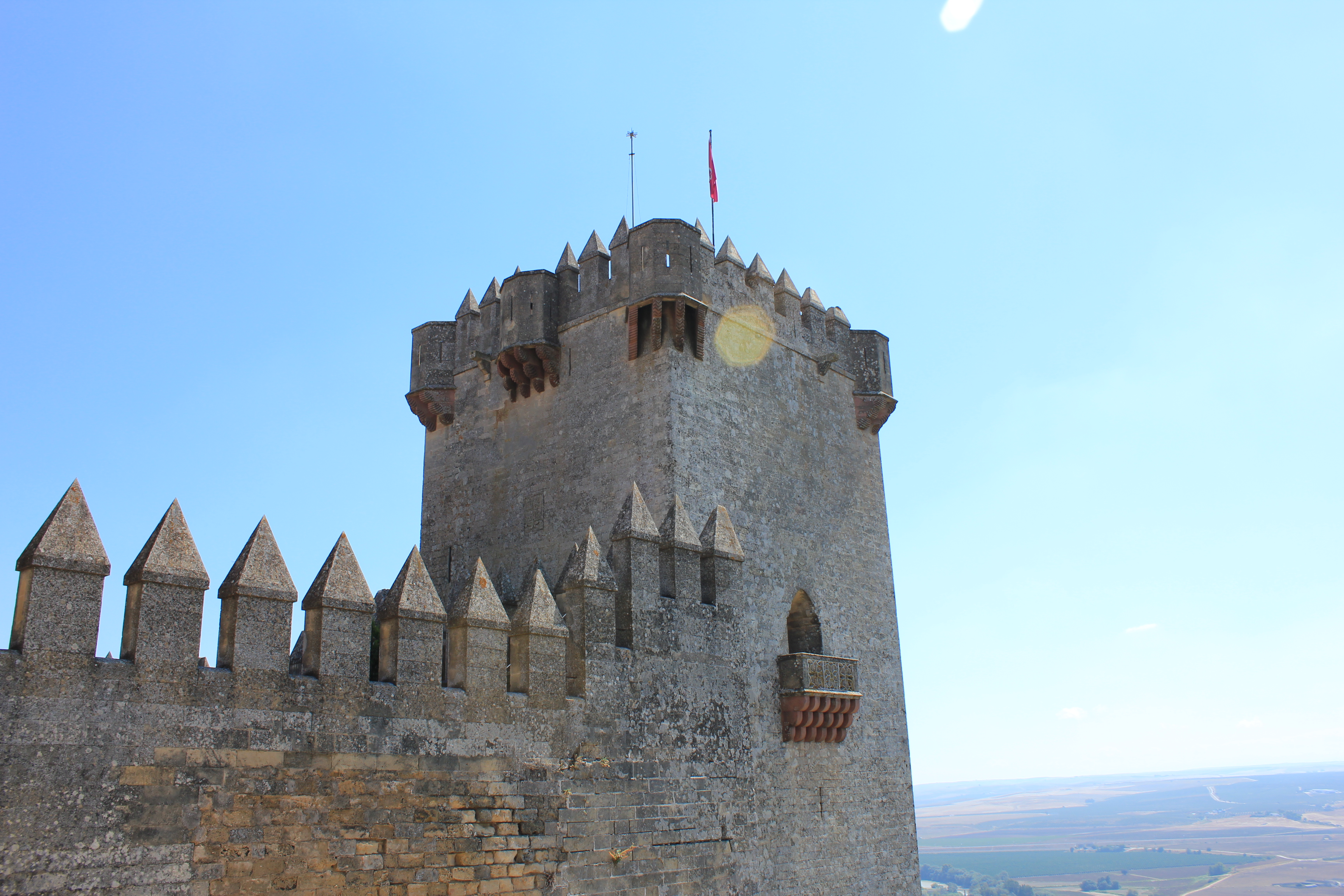
Tower

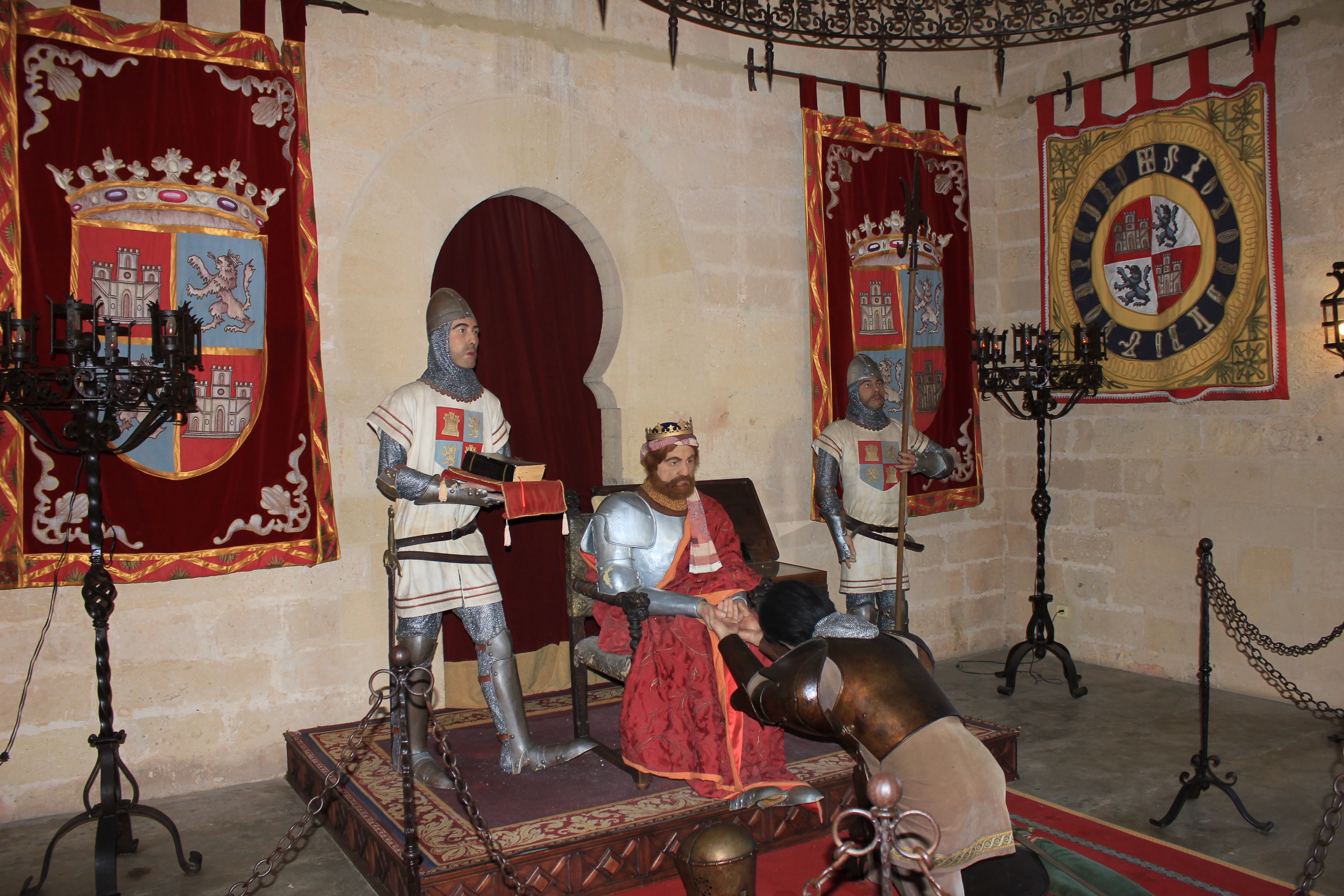
King's Hall

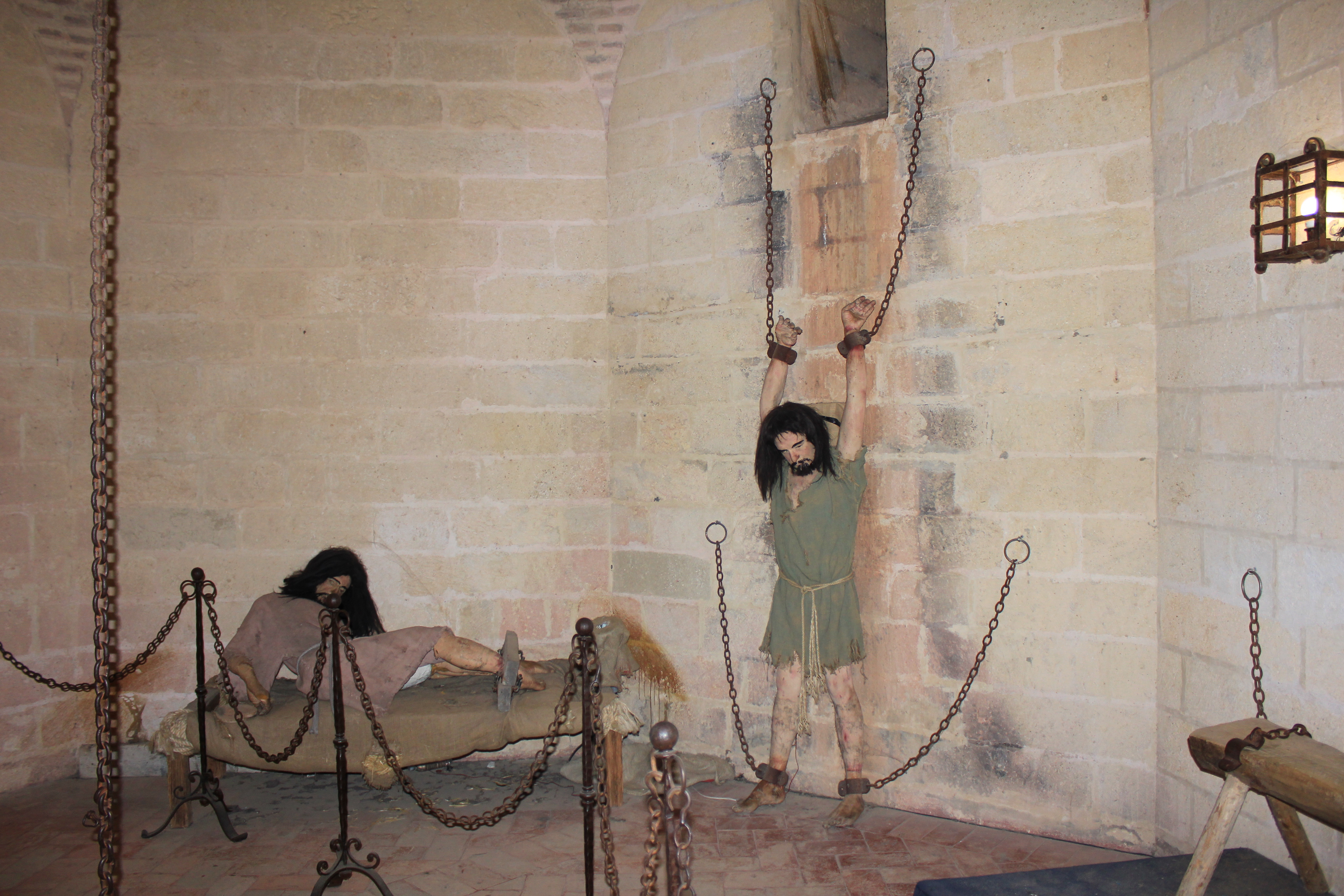
Torture chamber

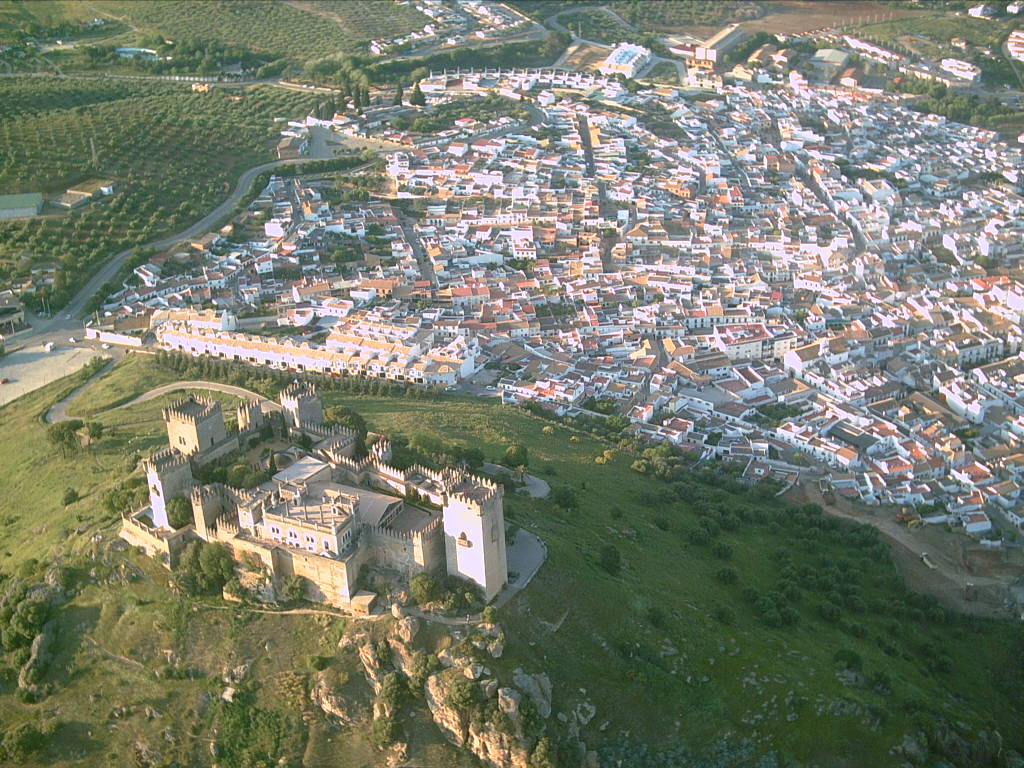
Aerial view of the castle and Almodóvar del Río

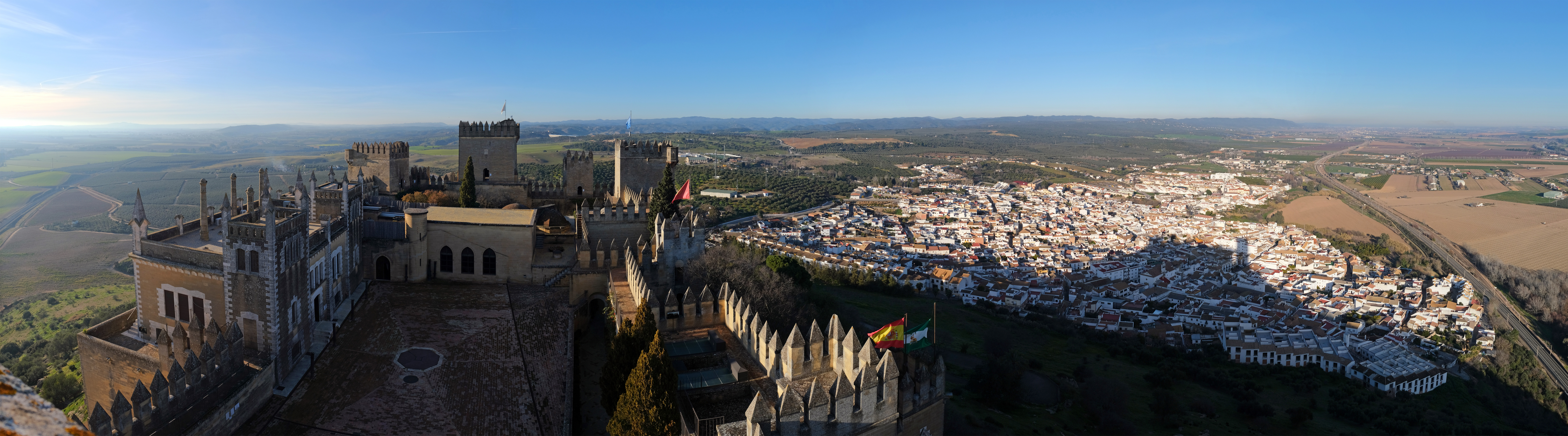
View of the castle and the town
