= Two Women at a Window =

Painting by Bartolomé Esteban Murillo

Two Women at a Window (Spanish: Mujeres en la ventana) is an oil on canvas painting by Bartolomé Esteban Murillo, created in 1665–1675, now held in the National Gallery of Art in Washington, D.C., measuring 125 by 104 cm.

Its first recorded owner was Pedro Francisco Luján y Góngora, Duke of Almodóvar del Río, whose heirs sold it to William A'Court in 1823. It remained in his family until being sold to an art dealer in 1894 and later that year by the dealer to Peter Arrell Browne Widener, who left it to its present owner in 1915.
