= Ramón de Bonifaz =

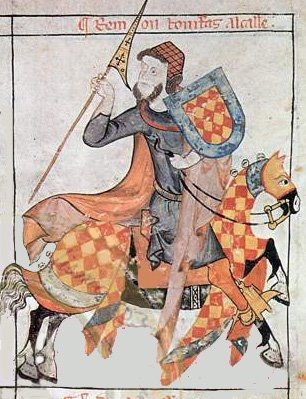
Medieval illustration of Ramón de Bonifaz.

Ramón de Bonifaz (1196-1252 or 1256) was a medieval Spanish naval leader best known for breaking a river barricade, leading to the capture of Seville from the Almohad Caliphate.

Bonifaz made his fortune as a merchant in Burgos, a city on the pilgrimage route to Santiago de Compostela, and may have descended from one of the many French or Italian families that settled along the sacred way. He had achieved clear financial success by 1227 when he purchased an extremely expensive house. Having made his fortune, Bonifaz served as alcalde or mayor of the city for much of the early thirteenth century.

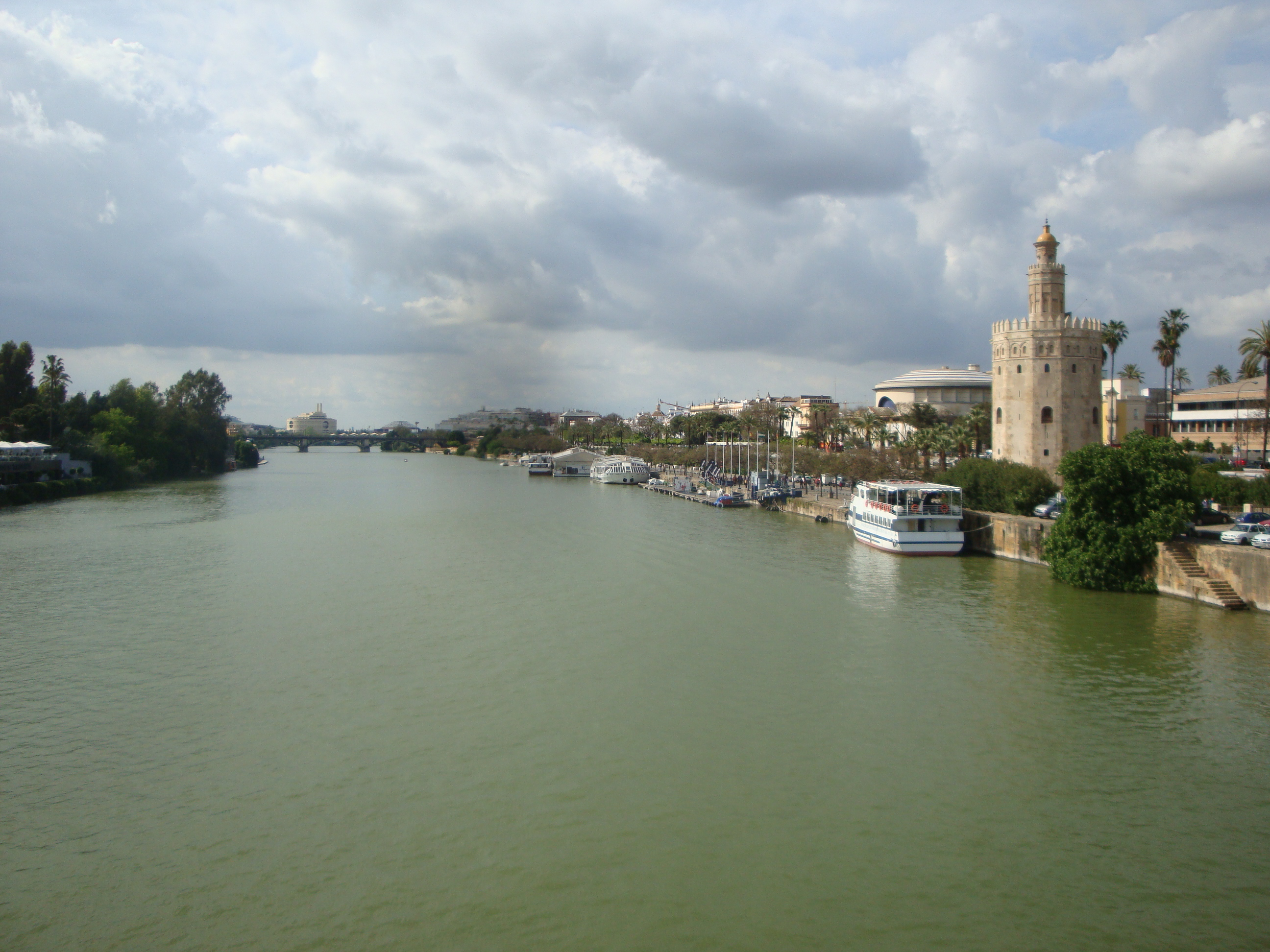
The Torre del Oro (at right) anchored one end of the barricade in the Guadalquivir. It marks where the Moorish defenses spanned the river.

In 1247, King Ferdinand III of Castile and León ordered Bonifaz to organize a fleet to join in the reconquista of Seville. Bonifaz drew his motley navy mostly from ships in the Bay of Biscay and took them up the Guadalquivir River to attack the Almohad held city. Moorish ships from Seville, Ceuta, and Tangier met Bonifaz at the mouth of the Guadalquivir. Bonifaz's force of thirteen large ships combined with smaller vessels sunk several ships and drove the others away. In 1248, Bonifaz famously broke the city's river defenses leading to the fall of Seville. The Moors barricaded the river with a pontoon bridge braced with a heavy, metal chain that stretched from the Torre del Oro (Tower of the Gold) to the opposite bank. The bridge connected Seville to the outlying neighborhood of Triana and became the only supply line for the besieged city. Bonifaz rammed the barrier with fortified boats and broke the barricade. Without a source of provisions, Seville soon surrendered.

Bonifaz received many honors for his role in the reconquest of Seville. He was made a royal official in 1252, and may have been the first Admiral of Castile, although some scholars consider the evidence for Bonifaz having this title weak. Bonifaz's descendants played a major role in the political and social life of Burgos for more than a century after the admiral's death. The coat of arms of Cantabria shows Bonifaz breaking the chains across the Guadalquivir.

== Works cited ==
- Callcott, Lady Maria (1821). A Short History of Spain. Vol. 1. London: John Murray.
- Batista, Juan (2007). España Estratégica: Guerra y Diplomacia en la Historia de España (in Spanish). Madrid: Silex Ediciones. ISBN 978-84-7737-183-0.
- Irving, Washington (1904). "Moorish Chronicles". The Works of Washington Irving. Vol. 8. New York: Collier.
- Ruiz, Teófilo (2003). "Bonifaz, Ramón". In Gerli, E. Michael; Armistead, Samuel G. (eds.). Medieval Iberia: an encyclopedia. New York & London: Routledge. ISBN 978-0-415-93918-8.
