= Regata Sevilla-Betis =

Rowing race

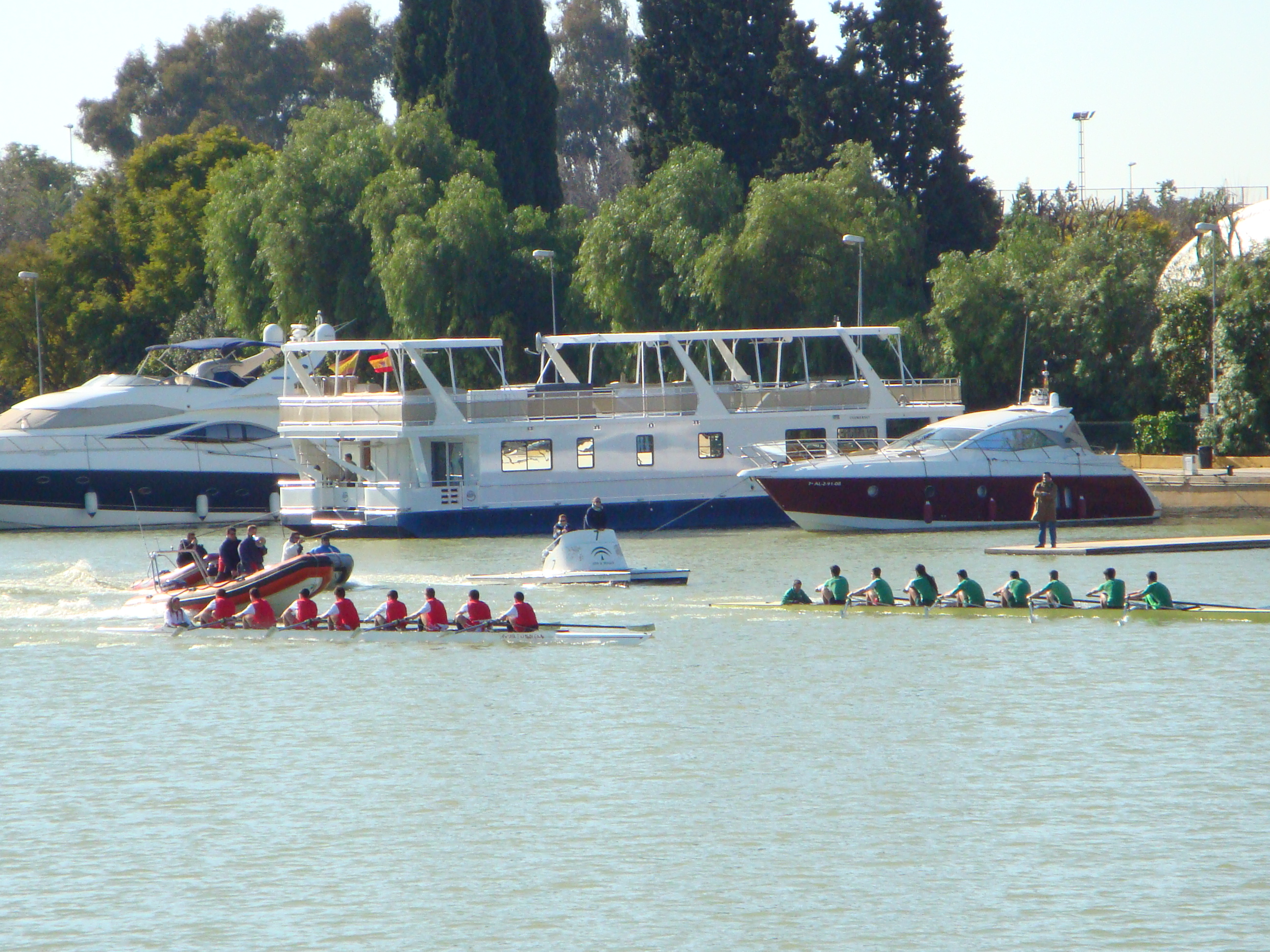
2009 edition of the race in front of Club Náutico Sevilla

The Regata Sevilla-Betis is a rowing race that nowadays is held every year on the second Saturday of November on the river Guadalquivir, in Seville, Spain, between two eights drawn from the two most important football teams in the city: Sevilla Fútbol Club and Real Betis Balompié. As of the end of the 2026 race (14 November 2026), Sevilla men have won 32 races, Betis men have won 28. Betis women lead Sevilla women 21 race wins to 16.

The course covers the 3.6-mile (6200m) stretch of the Guadalquivir crossing the city from north to south, between the San Jerónimo bridge near Alamillo Park, to the Muelle de Nueva York, near Los Remedios Bridge.

== History ==
The race goes back to the beginning of rowing in Seville, which is closely related to the foundation of Club Náutico Sevilla in 1956. It was Don Miguel López Torróntegui who, in 1960, had the idea of creating a race on the water in the light of the friendly but intense rivalry between the two football teams.

== See also ==
- Seville
