= Pepe Díaz =

Spanish footballer

Personal information
- Full name: José Díaz Sánchez
- Date of birth: 20 April 1980 (age 46)
- Place of birth: Almodóvar del Río, Spain
- Height: 1.73 m (5 ft 8 in)
- Position: Striker

Youth career
- Córdoba

Senior career*
Years	Team	Apps	(Gls)
1998	Córdoba	7	(0)
1998–1999	Pozoblanco	15	(0)
1999–2001	Novelda	31	(5)
2001–2002	Córdoba B	6	(3)
2002–2003	Cartagonova	24	(3)
2003–2004	Écija	25	(2)
2004–2005	Guadalajara		
2005–2006	Baza	38	(14)
2006–2008	Écija	68	(30)
2008–2012	Córdoba	126	(28)
2013	Oviedo	17	(1)
2013–2015	Lucena	58	(11)
Total		415	(97)
- * Club domestic league appearances and goals

José Díaz Sánchez (born 20 April 1980 in Almodóvar del Río, Córdoba), commonly known as Pepe Díaz, is a Spanish retired footballer who played as a striker.
