= Torre de la Plata =

Military tower in Andalusia, Seville, Spain

Coordinates: 37°22′04″N 5°59′02″W

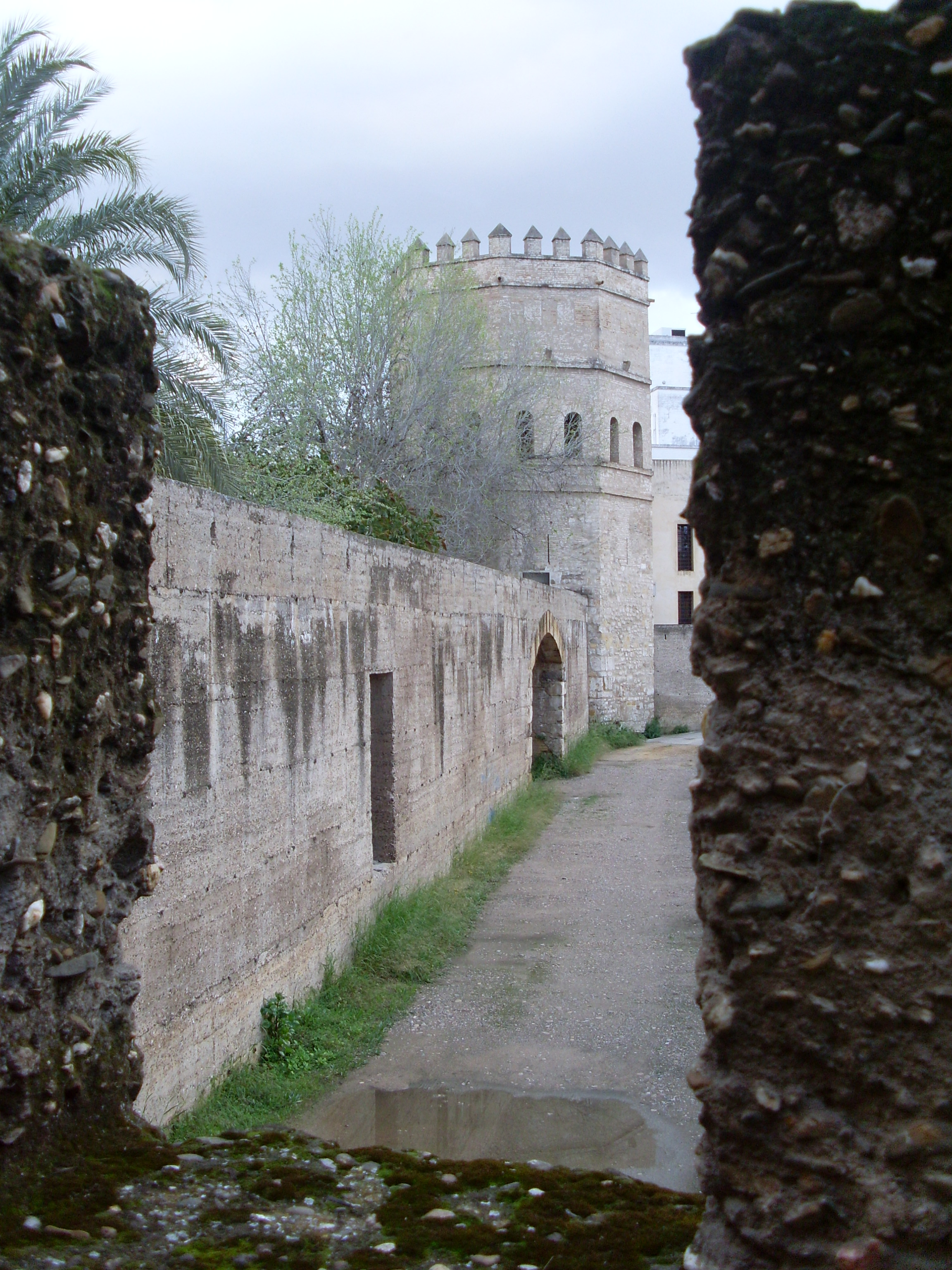
The Torre de la Plata.

The Torre de la Plata (Spanish: Tower of Silver) is an octagonal military tower in Andalusia, located in present-day Seville, southern Spain. It was constructed by the Almohad Caliphate.

== History ==
The tower dates from the thirteenth century and was linked by the city wall to another Moorish fortification, the Torre del Oro.

The neglected tower had been overgrown with vegetation and occupied by homeless people. It was restored in 1992.

== See also ==
Torre del Oro
