= The Torre del Oro =

Painting by David Roberts

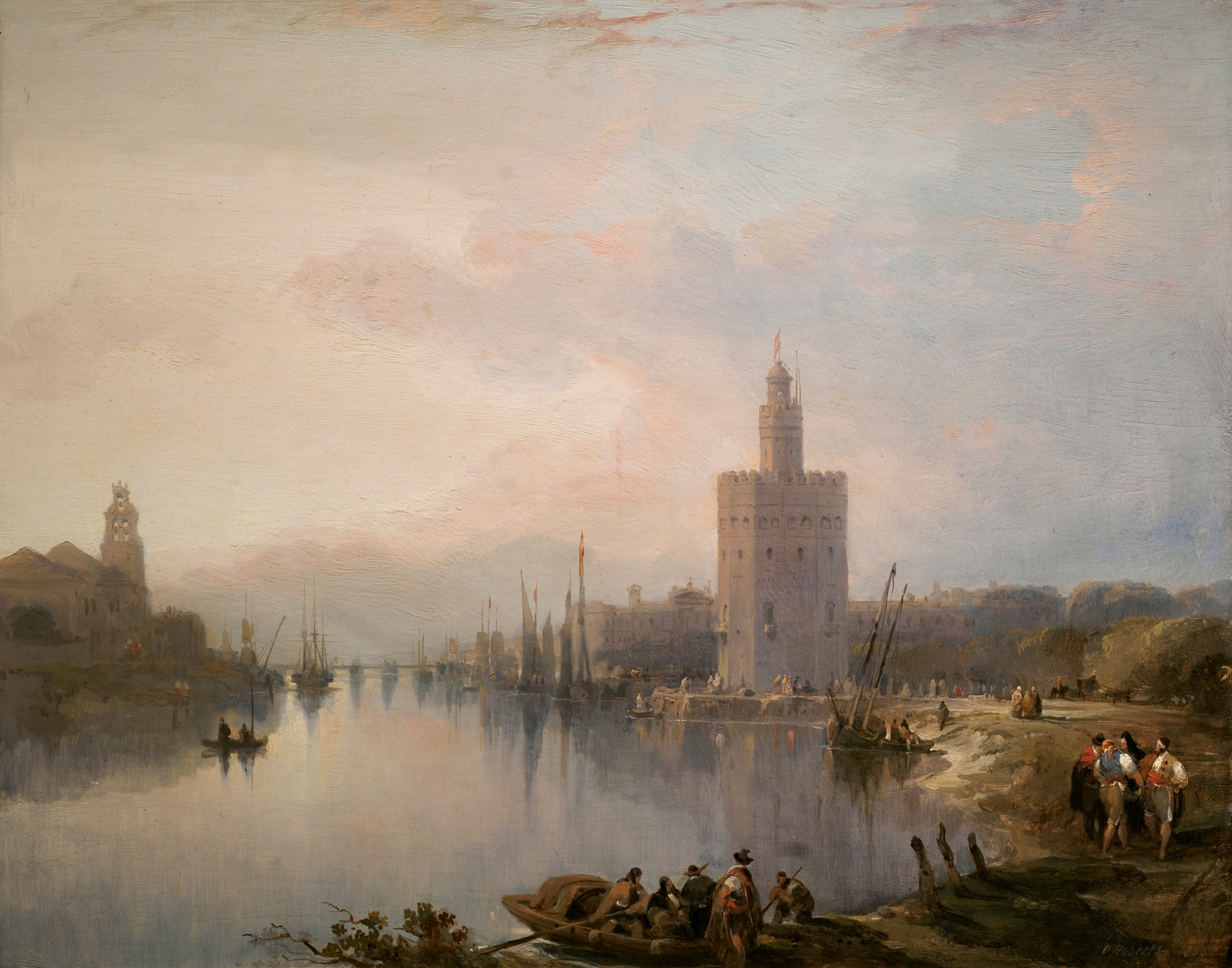
- Artist: David Roberts
- Year: 1833
- Type: Oil on panel, landscape painting
- Dimensions: 40 cm × 48 cm (16 in × 19 in)
- Location: Museo del Prado; Madrid

The Torre del Oro (Spanish: La Torre del Oro) is an 1833 landscape painting by the British artist David Roberts. It depicts a view of the Torre del Oro, a Moorish military watchtower in Seville in Southern Spain, and the adjacent River Guadalquivir. A Romantic in style, Roberts toured Spain in the early 1830s and produced a number of pictures based on his experiences. He later became known for his Orientalist paintings of the Middle East. The painting is now in the collection of the Museo del Prado, in Madrid.

== Bibliography ==
- Boone, Mary Elizabeth. Vistas de España: American Views of Art and Life in Spain, 1860-1914. Yale University Press, 2007.
- Díez, García. The Nineteenth Century in the Prado. T.F. Editores, 2008.
- Hopkins, Claudia. Art and Identity in Spain, 1833–1956: The Orient Within. Bloomsbury, 2024.
- Sim, Katherine. David Roberts R.A., 1796–1864: A Biography. Quartet Books, 1984.
