= Axataf =

Qaid of Seville

Axataf was the Qaid of Seville at the time of the reconquest of the city by Ferdinand III of Castile in 1248. His name is cited in various ways in articles and essays, with Axataf being the most common, but it can also be found as Saqqaf, Chetaf and Axacad.

== History ==
On the death of Ibn Hud in 1238, Seville returned to owe tribute to the Almohad Empire and paid obedience to the Caliph Arraxid. After the death of Arraxid in 1242, his brother, Ali ben Idris Asaid Almotadidbila, was proclaimed caliph. A year later, the governor of Ceuta withdrew his obedience to the Moroccan caliph and recognized the suzerainty of the Sultanate of Tunis. Subsequently, the same thing happened with Sevilla, Tarifa and Jerez. Abu Zakariya Yahya, Sultan of Tunis, accepted that vassalage and sent to Seville a governor who won the antipathies of the Sevillians, who expelled him in 1245. He was succeeded by Bel Alchad, of Sevillian lineage. Bel Alchad, fearful of the reaction of the Tunisians and the advance of Christian troops, decided to sign an alliance with Ferdinand III for a period of one year. Bel Achad was killed by Axataf, the commander of the garrison in Seville, in March 1246. This violent act led to the end of the truce with Fernando, who, free of his commitment to Bel Alchad, directed his attention to Seville and began with preparations to attack the city. Axataf was declared military commander of the city and ruled along with a council of nobles. However, he could not resist the siege imposed by Ferdinand III and the city had to surrender to the Christians on November 23, 1248. Axataf handed the keys of the city to the Castilian king. He fled to Ceuta in one of the ships offered by Fernando for the Moors who, having to leave Seville, decided to march to Africa.

He was murdered in November 1249 by order of Al-Afazi, head of an anti-Tunisian uprising.
