= Almodóvar del Río =

- Municipality
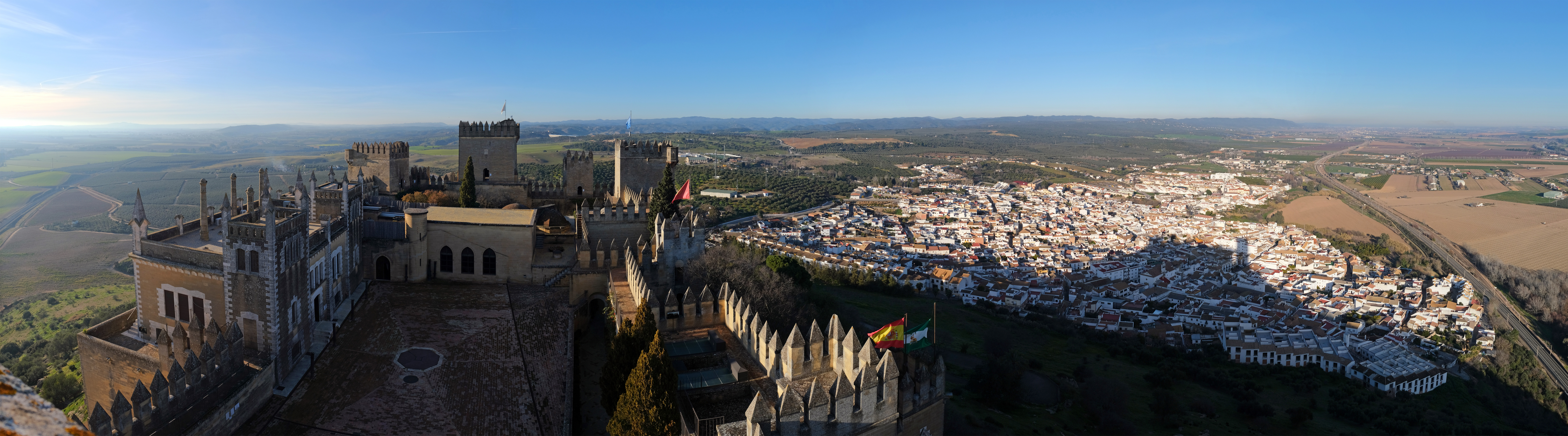

- Seal

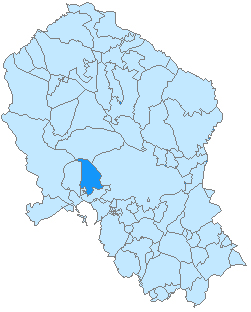

- Location in Spain.
- Coordinates: 37°48′N 5°01′W
- Country: Spain
- Autonomous community: Andalusia
- Province: Córdoba
- Comarca: Vega del Guadalquivir

Government
  - Mayor: María Sierra Luque Calvillo

Area
  - Total: 174 km^{2} (67 sq mi)
- Elevation: 121 m (397 ft)

Population (2025-01-01)
  - Total: 8,040
  - Density: 46.2/km^{2} (120/sq mi)
- Demonym: Cucos
- Time zone: UTC+1 (CET)
  - Summer (DST): UTC+2 (CEST)
- Website: www.almodovardelrio.es

Almodóvar del Río is a municipality located in the province of Córdoba, Spain, located in the Valle Medio del Guadalquivir Comarca. In 2022, there were 8093 inhabitants. It belongs to the judicial district of Posadas.

== Geography ==
The main city is located 121 meters above sea level, with the Sierra Morena to the north and countryside to the south. It has an additional three population centers: Los Mochos, Los Llanos, and Barriada Nuestra Señora del Rosario (also known as Casa Baratas).

Its municipality occupies approximately 173 km², comprising territory in the northern mountains as well as in the plains and countryside to the south. A large part of its northern area is a protected zone, as it is part of the Sierra de Hornachuelos Natural Park.

== History ==
The oldest settlements in the municipality of Almodóvar del Río dates back to the Lower Paleolithic, with several sites having been documented (railway station, mouth of the Arroyo del Temple and de los Mochos), which have provided stone materials called boulders and bifaces. Likewise, in a cave on Cerro de Castillo, vestiges dating back to the Chalcolithic appeared.

The transition to the historical period is testified by the material remains ascribable to the Final Orientalizing Bronze, located in sites at the confluence of the Guadalquivir and the Guadiato River, and also in Cerro del Castillo. In this last place, evidence has also been found of the durability of the habitat in the Iberian period, as evidenced by the discovery of the typical Iberian painted ceramics of bands and circles. Of great relevance is a stone frieze with hunting scenes, which represents the hunting of a deer by several characters on horseback, followed by a cart pulled by donkeys; It dates back to between the 4th and 3rd centuries BC.

In Roman times, the main population center would be concentrated in the surroundings of Cerro del Castillo, extending through the northern area of the current town, where finds of amphorae and coins have been made; Inhumation tombs have also been documented in its surroundings. It is generally identified, with certain problems, with Carbula, a city mentioned in a passage (Naturalis Historia, III, 10) by the Roman geographer Pliny; Carbula was an oppidum -fortified town-, which, with the arrival of the Romans, would be integrated into the colonial territory of Colonia Patricia Corduba. This territory stands out for the abundance of archaeological sites that testify to extraordinary agricultural activity, centered on the cultivation of olive trees, as well as a great development of the olive oil trade, since enormous quantities of oil were exported from there, packaged in amphorae, manufactured in potteries. close to the Guadalquivir River (Cortijo de Rojas, El Temple, El Sotillo, Villaseca...). Important works of hydraulic engineering are the underground aqueducts of Cortijo Nuevo and Fuenreal. The habitat would last during the Visigothic period, as testified by the funerary epigraphs dated to the second half of the 6th century and the 7th century.

After the Muslim conquest, a fortress was established on the hill (740), and the town then received the name al-Mudawwar al-Adna, a toponym that means "the round one", in clear allusion to the shape of the hill itself. The chronicles mention the population in that year, when the caliph of Damascus appointed the lord of Almodóvar, Add al-Malik ben Qatan, to occupy the emirate of al-Andalus for the second time until he died in the civil war against the Syrians. During the 8th, 9th and 10th centuries, the fortress and its terminus were part of the Cordoba heart; In the 11th century it was attached first to the taifa of Carmona and then to that of Seville; With the Almoravids it was reintegrated into the jurisdiction of Cordoba and, finally, in the 12th century and part of the 13th century it became dependent on the Almohad court of Seville. This district had a large rural population and was covered with forests, little cereal production and abundant hunting.

In 1226, the Muslim king of Baeza was decapitated in Almodóvar del Río, who was accused of treason by the Almohads for his alliance with Fernando III the Saint, king of Castile and León.

It remained for 5 centuries under the influence of the Umayyad caliphate, until in 1240 it was incorporated, through a treaty, to the Crown of Castille during the reign of Ferdinand III of Castille and León, who conquered the city of Córdoba in 1236. In the year 1243 the city was integrated with the Council of Córdoba, staying under its jurisdiction in the following centuries.

In 1394, Frederick of Castile, illegitimate son of Henry II of Castile, died in the castle of Almodóvar del Río while being held prisoner.

The ownership of the castle is linked during the 15th century to the House of Baena y Cabra. Likewise, its notable location and the impregnability of its walls led to it being used as the residence of the monarchs Peter I and Henry II, and as a prison, as attested to by an order of the Royal Council (1491). Around 1473 the name Almodóvar del Río appears for the first time, a toponym intended to refer to its location on the banks of the Guadalquivir.

The town remained linked to the Crown, until Philip IV agreed to the sale of the jurisdiction and lordship for fifteen million maravedís and the mayor's office and the castle for one million and a half, in favor of Francisco Corral y Guzmán. Its population decreased during this period: from 1,600 residents in 1530 to 800 at the end of the Modern Age; The majority were dedicated to field work as day laborers. The cultivation of cereal stood out, then the olive grove, and the vine had less importance. Livestock farming provided part of their livelihood, especially goat farming, followed by sheep and sow farming.

The liberal revolution, which occurred in Spain and Portugal at the beginning of the 19th century, had far-reaching socioeconomic repercussions in the town, since the disappearance of the manorial regime and the ecclesiastical and municipal confiscations had an impact on the consolidation of the latifundia within the area, which generated a high social conflict, which manifested itself during the Second Republic and the Spanish Civil War.

== Human Geography ==
It has a population of 7,995 inhabitants (INE 2023):

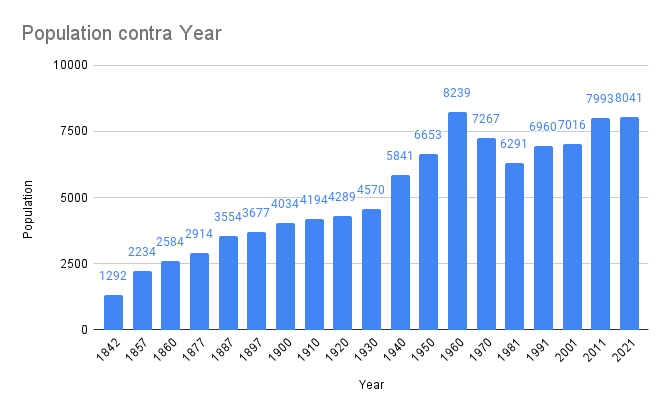
Population vs Year graph of Almodovar del Rio

=== Population Centers ===
Population breakdown according to the Continuous Register by Population Unit of the INE.

Center	Inhibitants (2014)	Men	Women
Almodóvar del Río	6197	3091	3106
Los Mochos	1780	915	865

== Notable residents ==
- Manuel Alba Blanes founding president of the Ateneo Popular de Almodóvar del Río in 1925 and last republican mayor
- Paco Morán, actor.
- Rafael Campanero Guzman, expresident of Córdoba CF.
- Pepe Diaz, ex football player.
- Antonio Manuel Rodríguez Ramos, writer, poet, musician, novelist, film and documentary scriptwriter, Professor of Law at the University of Córdoba, President of the Ateneo de Almodóvar del Río and the Federation of Athenaeums of Andalusia, Patron of the Blas Infante Foundation

== See also ==
- List of municipalities in Córdoba
- Castle of Almodóvar del Río
