= Torre del Oro =

Coordinates: 37°22′56.79″N 5°59′47.28″W

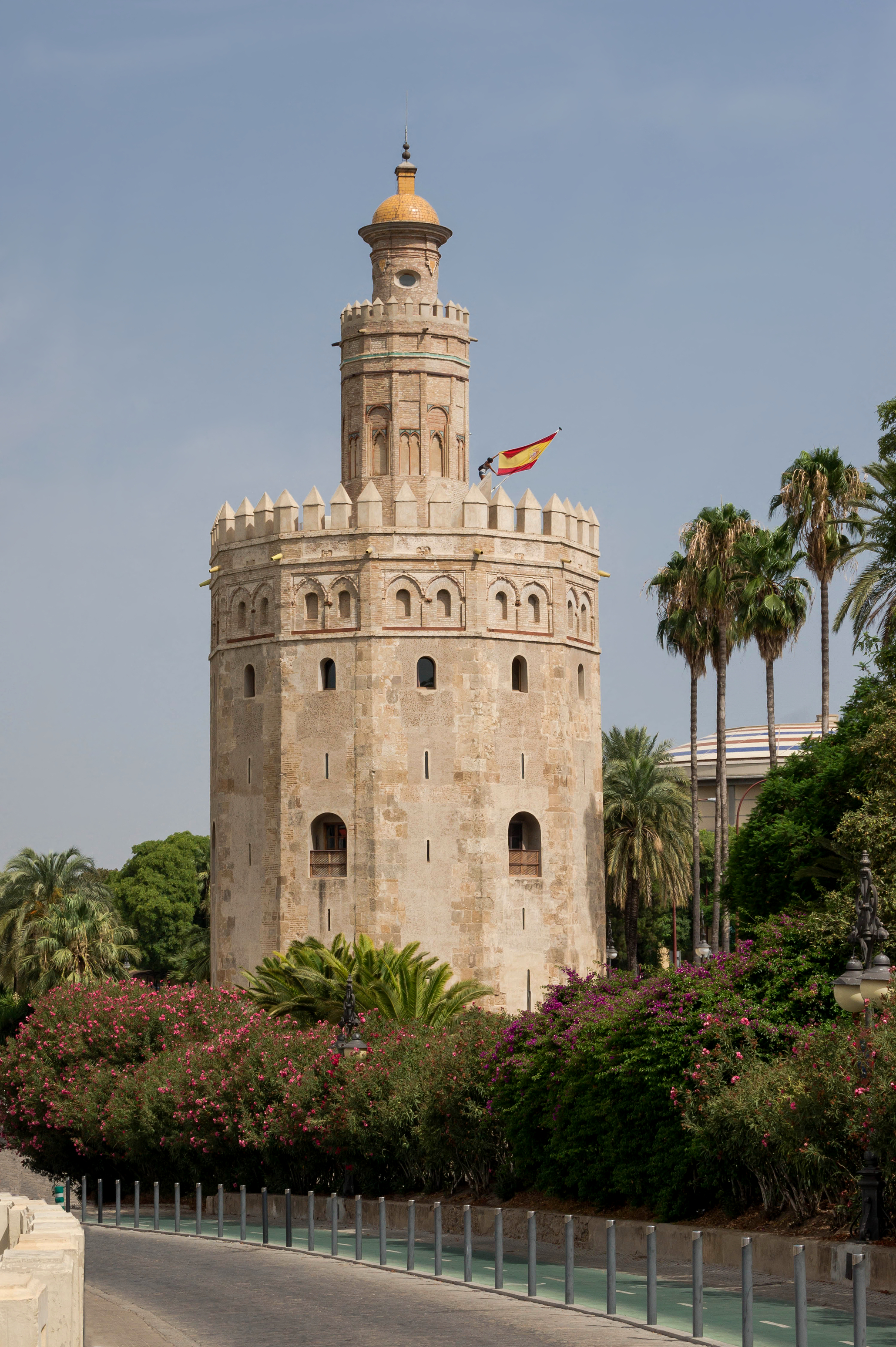
- The Torre del Oro, view from the north.
- Interactive map of the Torre del Oro area

General information
- Type: Watchtower
- Location: Seville, Spain

Spanish Cultural Heritage
- Type: Non-movable
- Criteria: Monument
- Designated: 3 June 1931
- Reference no.: RI-51-0000887

The Torre del Oro (Arabic: بُرْج الذَّهَب, romanized: burj aḏẖ-ḏẖahab, lit. 'Tower of Gold') is a dodecagonal military watchtower in Seville, southern Spain. It was erected by the Almohad Caliphate in order to control access to Seville via the Guadalquivir river.

Constructed in the first third of the 13th century, the tower served as a prison during the Middle Ages. Its name comes from the golden shine it projected on the river, due to its building materials (a mixture of mortar, lime and pressed hay).

== Construction details ==
The tower is divided into three levels, the first level, dodecagonal, was built in 1220 by order of the Almohad governor of Seville, Abù l-Ulà; As for the second level, of only 8 meters, also dodecagonal, was built by Peter of Castile in the fourteenth century, a hypothesis that has been confirmed by archaeological studies; The third and uppermost being circular in shape was added after the previous third level, Almohad, was damaged by the 1755 Lisbon earthquake. Rebuilding of the third level was made by Brusselian military engineer Sebastian Van der Borcht in 1760.

The Torre de la Plata, an octagonal tower, is located nearby, and is believed to have been constructed during the same era.

== Military function ==
It is one of two anchor points for a large chain that would have been able to block the river. The other anchor-point has since been demolished or disappeared, possibly collapsing during the 1755 Lisbon earthquake. The chain was used in the city's defense against the Castilian fleet under Ramón de Bonifaz in the 1248 Reconquista. Bonifaz broke the river defenses and isolated Seville from Triana.

== Historical role ==
The Tower of Gold was built 1220–1221, by order of the Almohad governor of Seville, Abu l-Ulà, with a twelve-sided base. It barred the way to the Arenal district with a section of wall joining it to the Torre de la Plata, a part of the city walls that defended the Alcazar.

The tower was badly damaged by the Lisbon earthquake of 1755, and the Marquis of Monte Real proposed demolishing it to widen the way for horse-drawn coaches and straighten access to the bridge of Triana; however, the people of Seville objected and appealed to the king, who intervened. In 1760, the damage was repaired, with repairs to the bottom floor of the tower, reinforcement with rubble and mortar, and the creation of a new main access via the passageway to the path around the wall. That same year, the upper cylindrical body was built, a work of the military engineer Sebastian Van der Borcht, also architect of the Royal Tobacco Factory of Seville. These works changed the appearance of the tower as compared to what is seen in engravings from the sixteenth or seventeenth centuries. On August 13, 1992, the Torre del Oro was made a brother to the Tower of Belem of Lisbon to celebrate the Universal Exposition in Seville. As of 2008 the museum displayed a variety of old navigational instruments and models, as well as historical documents, engravings, and nautical charts, relating Seville to the Guadalquivir River and the sea. The tower was again restored in 2005.

== Gallery ==
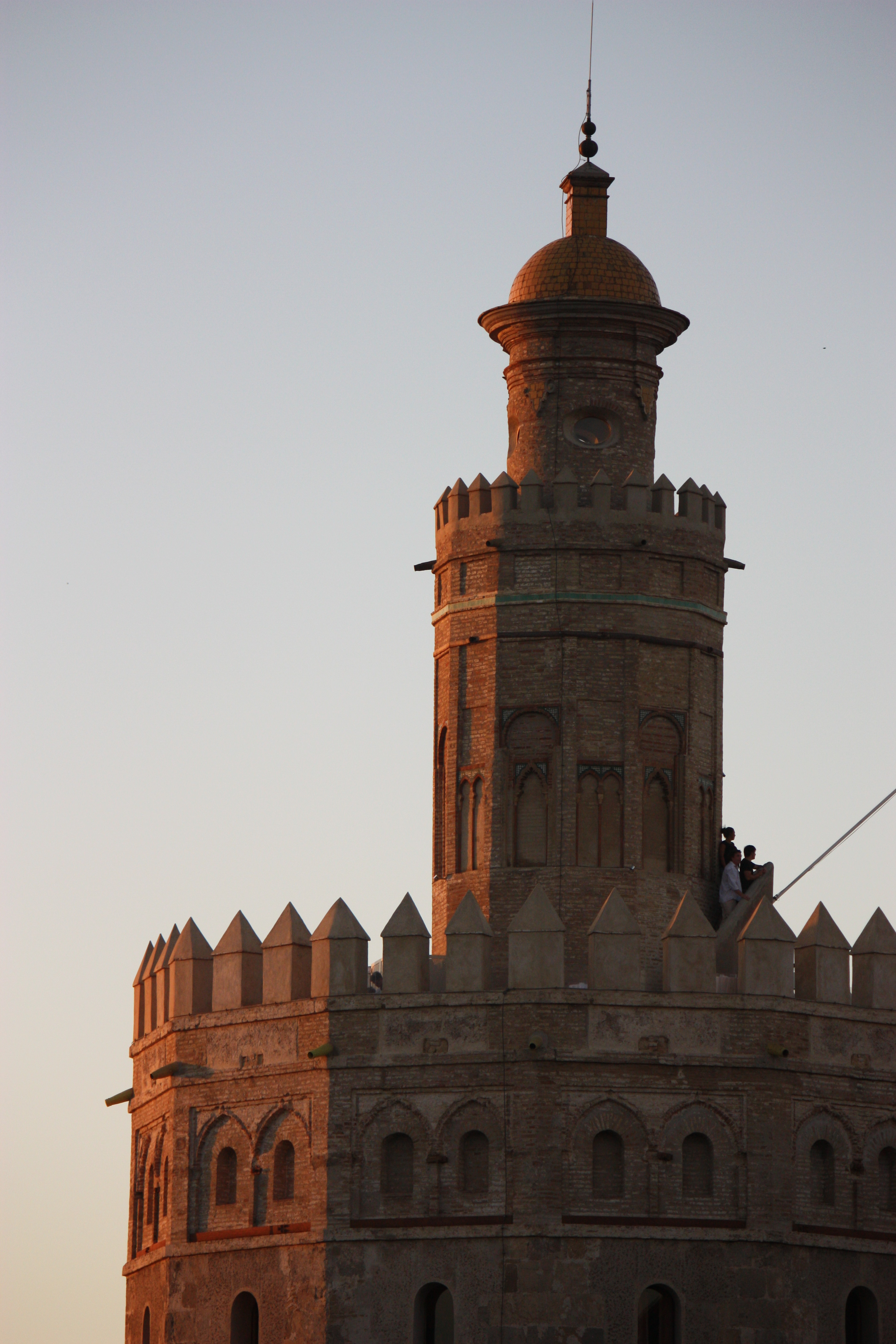
This image shows completely the levels that are not Almohads, the second and the third level.

Charles Clifford - El Guadalquivir, la Torre del Oro, Sevilla (ca 1862)

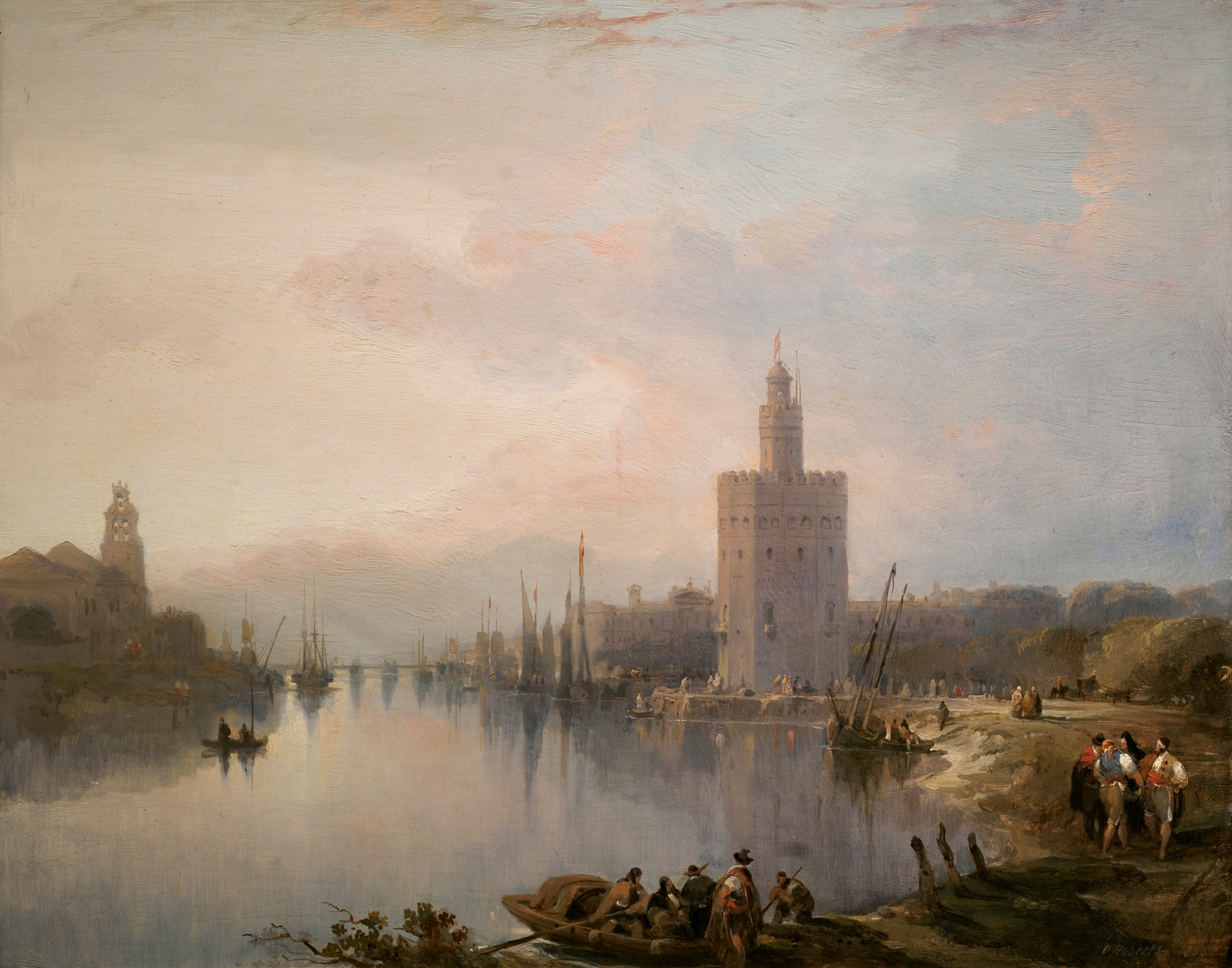
David Roberts - The Torre del Oro (1833)

== See also ==
- Torre de la Plata
