= Guadalquivir =

River in Spain

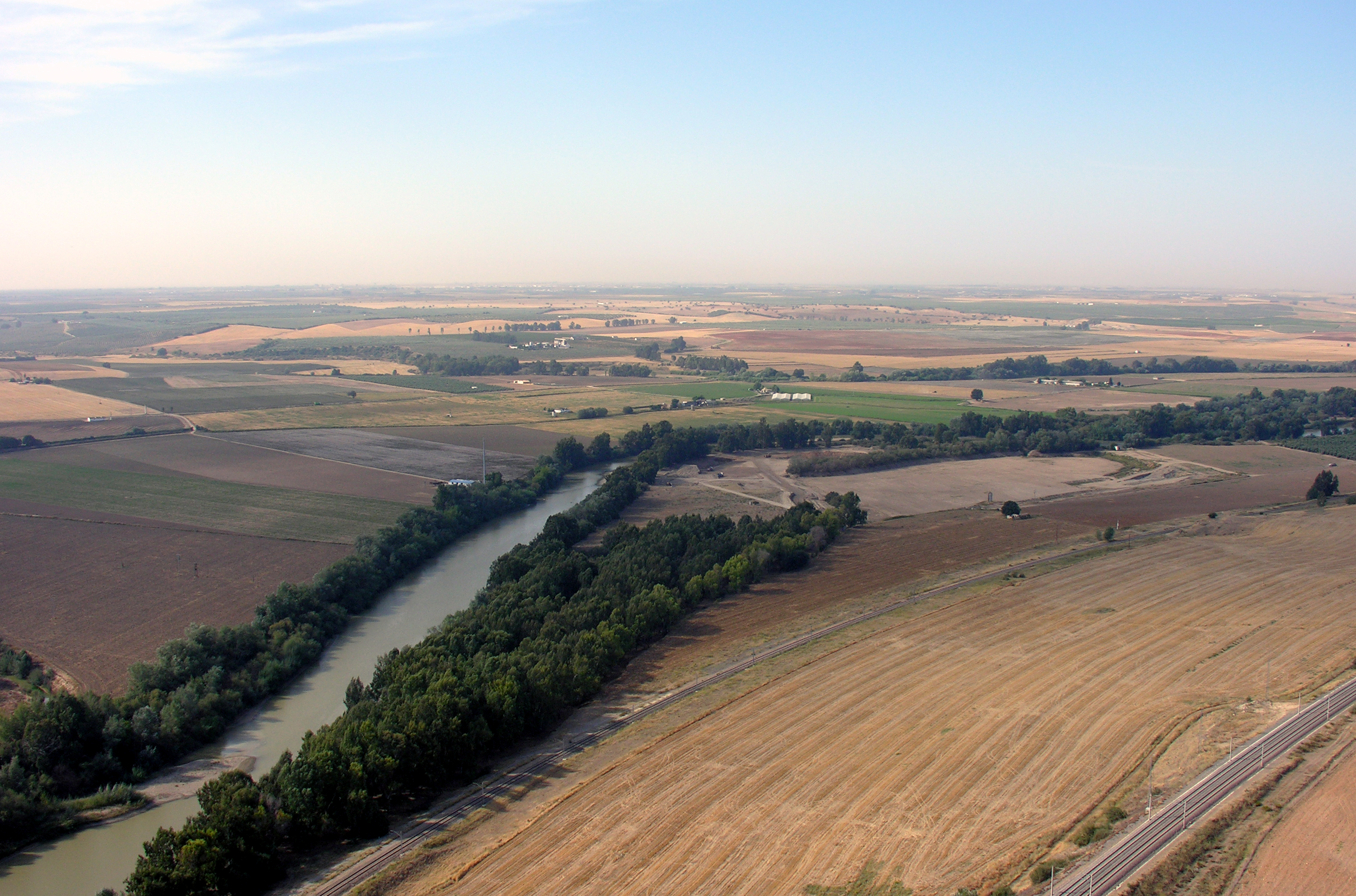
- The Guadalquivir passing near Almodóvar del Río

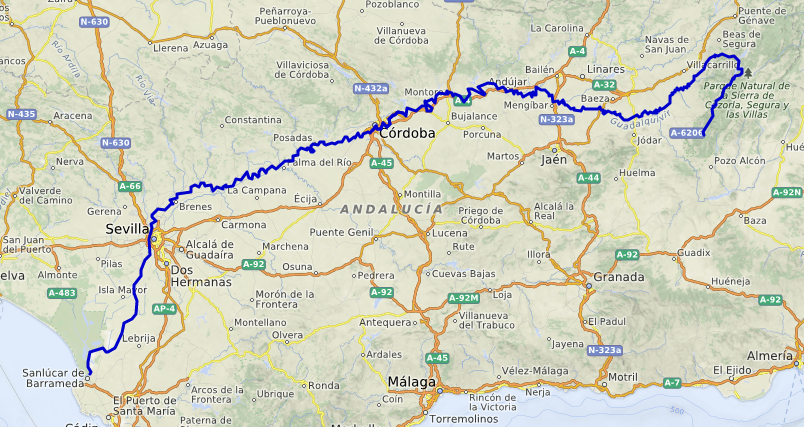
- Location of the Guadalquivir
- Etymology: from الوادي الكبير (al-wādī l-kabīr), "the great valley" or "the great river" in Arabic

Location
- Country: Spain
- Region: Andalusia
- Cities: Córdoba, Seville

Physical characteristics
- Source: Cañada de las Fuentes, Sierra de Cazorla
  - location: Quesada, Andalusia
  - coordinates: 37°50′20″N 2°58′26″W
  - elevation: 1,350 m (4,430 ft)
- Mouth: Gulf of Cádiz, Atlantic Ocean
  - location: Sanlúcar de Barrameda, Andalusia
  - coordinates: 36°47′N 6°21′W
  - elevation: 0 m (0 ft)
- Length: 657 km (408 mi)
- Basin size: 56,978 km^{2} (21,999 sq mi)
- Discharge
  - location: Sanlúcar de Barrameda
  - average: 164.3 m^{3}/s (5,800 cu ft/s)

Basin features
- Tributaries
  - left: Guadiana Menor, Guadalbullón, Guadajoz, Genil, Corbones, Guadaira
  - right: Guadalimar, Jándula, Yeguas, Guadalmellato, Guadiato, Bembézar, Viar, Rivera de Huelva, Guadiamar

The Guadalquivir (/ˌɡwɑːdəlkɪˈvɪər/, also UK: /-kwɪˈ-/, US: /-kiːˈ-, ˌɡwɑːdəlˈkwɪvər/, Spanish: [ɡwaðalkiˈβiɾ]) is the fifth-longest river in the Iberian Peninsula and the second-longest river with its entire length in Spain. The Guadalquivir is the only major navigable river in Spain. Currently it is navigable from Seville to the Gulf of Cádiz, but in Roman times it was both navigable from as far inland as Córdoba and opened into a shallow, yet wide natural harbor at sea.

== Geography ==
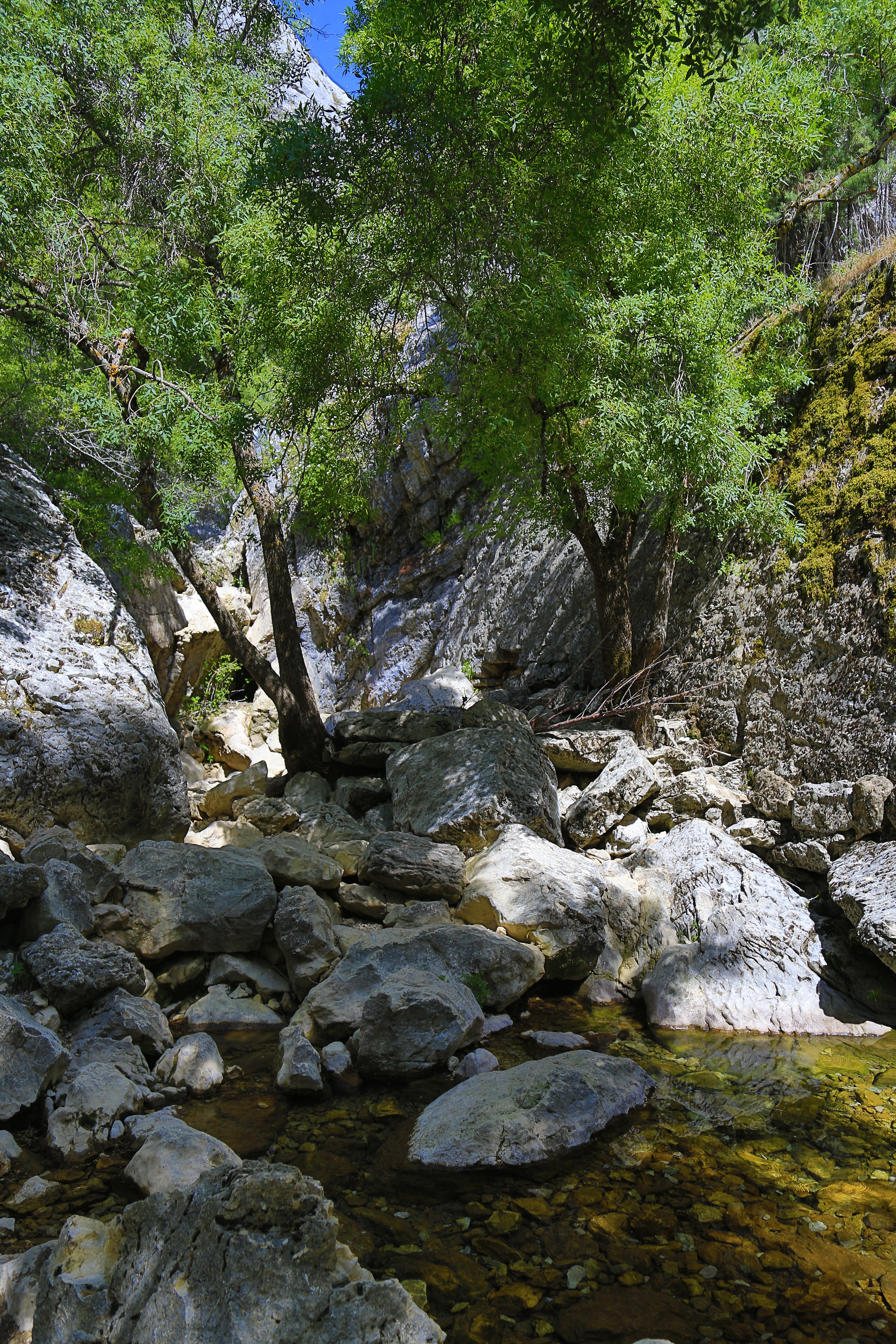
Birth of the Guadalquivir

The river is 657 km (408 mi) long and drains an area of about 58,000 km^{2} (22,000 sq mi). It flows through Córdoba and Seville and reaches the sea at Sanlúcar de Barrameda, flowing into the Gulf of Cádiz in the Atlantic Ocean.

=== Course ===
The course of the Guadalquivir is divided into three parts. This division is based on the main course of the river and its confluence with other rivers.

The Guadalquivir originates at an elevation of about 1,350 meters above sea level in a place known as Cañada de las Fuentes, in the Sierra de Cazorla mountain range. The upper course of the river runs from the source of the Guadalquivir roughly to Mengíbar. It includes its junction with the Guadalimar, just east of Mengíbar.

The middle course curso medio starts near Mengíbar and ends near Palma del Río. It includes the river's confluence with the Guadiana Menor and the Genil. The latter confluence is located between Palma del Río and Peñaflor.

The lower course of the Guadalquivir runs from Palma del Río to the sea. On its lower course, the Guadalquivir is joined by the river Corbonés and (from the north west) by the Rivera de Huelva. The marshy lowlands at the river's mouth are known as "Las Marismas". Here, the river borders the Doñana National Park reserve.

== Name ==
The modern name of Guadalquivir comes from the Arabic al-wādī l-kabīr (اَلْوَادِي الْكَبِيرْ), meaning "the great river".

There were a variety of names for the Guadalquivir in Classical and pre-Classical times. According to Titus Livius (Livy), The History of Rome, Book 28, the native people of Tartessians or Turdetanians called the river by two names: Certis (Kertis) and Rherkēs (Ῥέρκης). Greek geographers sometimes called it "the river of Tartessos", after the city of that name. The Romans called it by the name Baetis (which was the basis for name of the province of Hispania Baetica).

== History ==
=== Between Seville and Sanlúcar de Barrameda ===
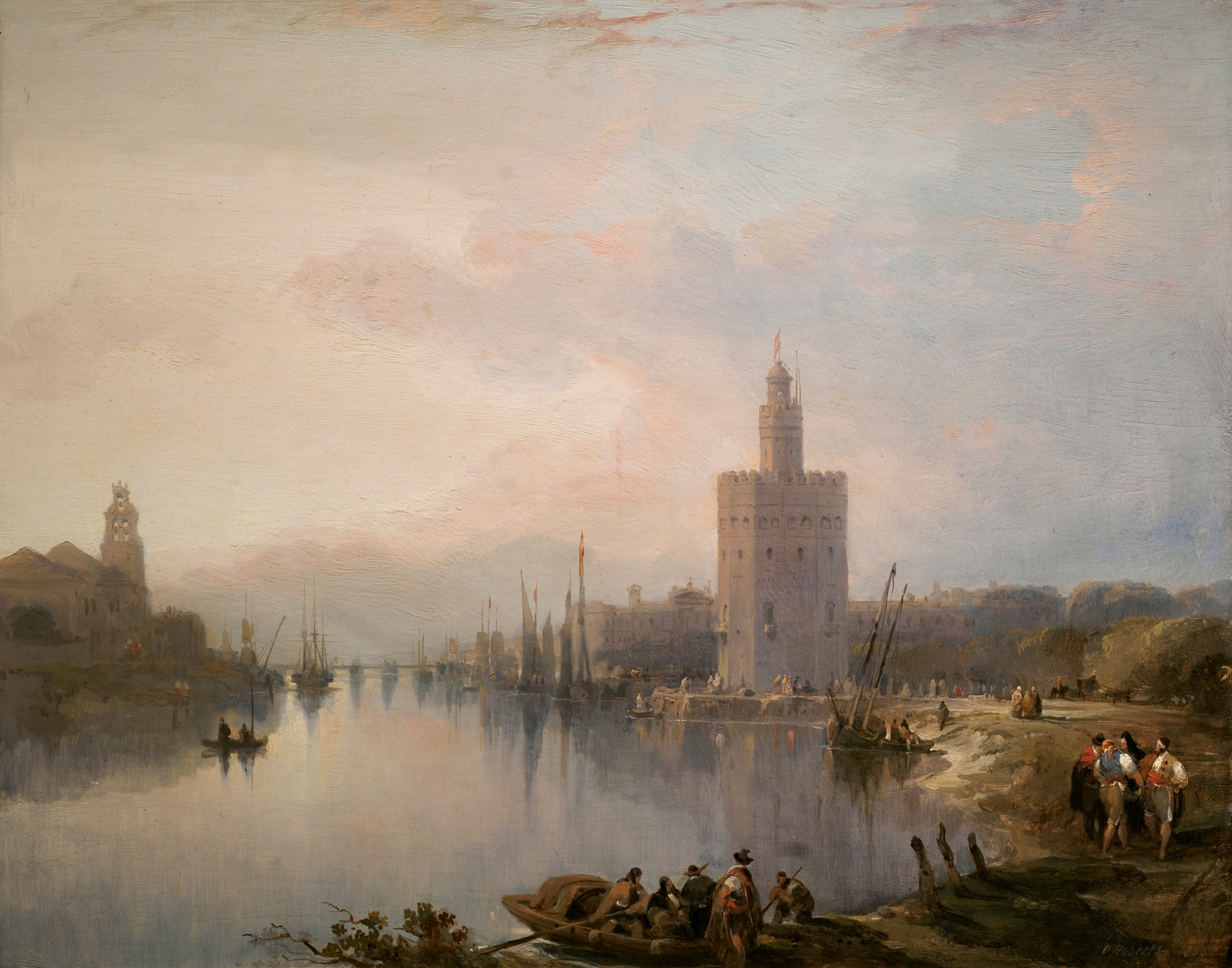
The Torre del Oro by David Roberts, 1833

During a significant portion of the Holocene, the western Guadalquivir valley was occupied by an inland sea, the Tartessian Gulf.

The Phoenicians established the first anchorage grounds and dealt in precious metals. The ancient city of Tartessos (that gave its name to the Tartessian Civilization) was said to have been located at the mouth of the Guadalquivir, although its site has not yet been found.

The Romans, whose name for the river was Baetis, settled in Hispalis (Seville), in the 2nd century BC, making it into an important river port. By the 1st century BC, Hispalis was a walled city with shipyards building longboats to carry wheat. In the 1st century AD the Hispalis was home to entire naval squadrons. Ships sailed to Rome with various products: minerals, salt, fish, etc. During the Arab rule between 712 and 1248 the Moors built a stone dock and the Torre del Oro (Tower of Gold), to reinforce the port defences.

In the 13th century Ferdinand III expanded the shipyards and from Seville's busy port, grain, oil, wine, wool, leather, cheese, honey, wax, nuts and dried fruit, salted fish, metal, silk, linen and dye were exported throughout Europe.

Following the discovery of the Americas, Seville became the economic centre of the Spanish Empire, because its port, under the jurisdiction of the Casa de Contratación (House of Trade), had come to hold the monopoly of the trans-oceanic trade. As early as the Middle Ages navigation of the Guadalquivir River was already becoming increasingly difficult: by the year 1500, a great deal of heavy cargo was being handled farther downstream at the harbor of Sanlúcar de Barrameda, where the Guadalquivir exits into the sea. As a consequence, Seville finally lost its trade monopoly to Cádiz.

During the late 18th century, a long series of works was started to again provide Seville with a good connection to the sea. The construction of the canal known as the Corta de Merlina in 1794 marked the beginning of the modernisation of the port of Seville. After five years of work (2005–2010), in late November 2010 the new Seville lock designed to regulate tides was finally in operation.

=== Upstream to Córdoba ===
During the Middle Ages, the Guadalquivir was navigable for barges from Seville up to Córdoba. In the city, there were piers at the Albolafia mill and near the Martos Mill. The bulky wool transports often left from the Cortijo Rubio pier about 15 km downstream. The river transport between Sevilla and Córdoba was managed by the Barqueros de Córdoba.

The navigable river gave Córdoba a cost advantage. It had relatively cheap transport to the sea, and thence to the world markets. Main imports like iron and wood, were also cheaper in Córdoba than in cities that lacked aquatic transport. During the 16th century, the silting up of the Guadalquivir became ever more serious and started to halt navigation on the river. In 1524 Fernán Pérez de Oliva made a famous speech about navigation between Sevilla and Córdoba.

The use of the river section between Córdoba and Sevilla as a power source, was another reason for the decline of navigation on this section of the river. The weirs that stored water in order to guarantee a steady power supply for water mills, directly hindered navigation. There were openings in the weirs, but their passage caused much damage to the barges. The weirs also led to raising the river bed. Perez de Oliva proposed to build locks in these weirs as a preliminary measure to restore navigation. In the end, the above developments put an end to inland navigation in the area.

The iconic Albolafia is a hydropowered scoop wheel. It was originally built by the Romans and lifted water from the river to the nearby Alcázar gardens. It was also used to mill flour.

=== Flooding ===
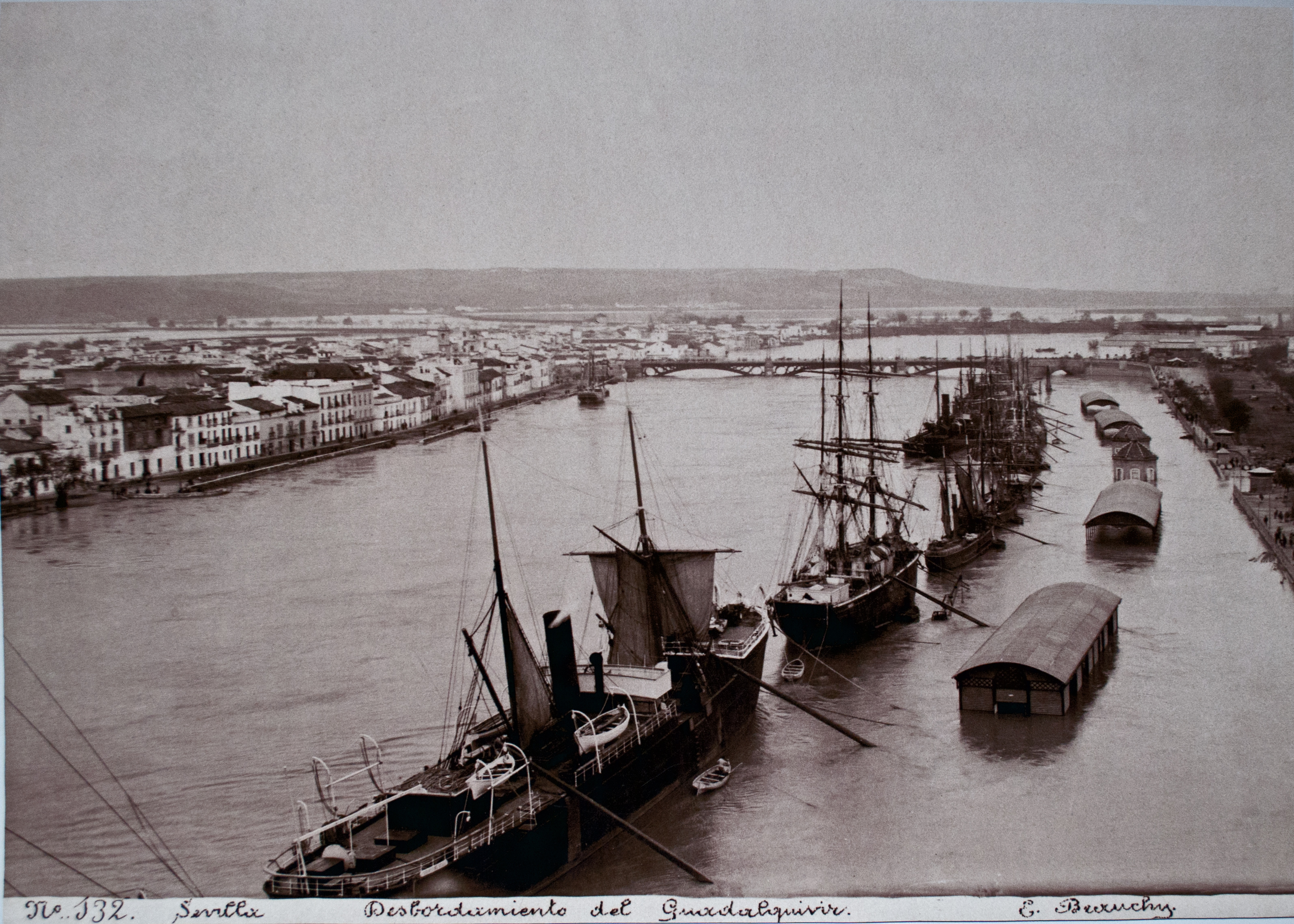
1892 flood in Seville

The Guadalquivir River Basin occupies an area of 63,085 km^{2} and has a long history of severe flooding.

During the winter of 2010 heavy rainfall caused severe flooding in rural and agricultural areas in the provinces of Seville, Córdoba and Jaén in the Andalusia region. The accumulated rainfall in the month of February was above 250 mm (10 in), double the precipitation for Spain for that month. In March 2010 several tributaries of the Guadalquivir flooded, causing over 1,500 people to flee their homes as a result of the increased flow of the Guadalquivir, which on 6 March 2010 reached 2,000 m^{3}/s (71,000 cu ft/s) in Córdoba and 2,700 m^{3}/s (95,000 cu ft/s) in Seville. This was below that recorded in Seville in the flood of 1963 when 6,000 m^{3}/s (210,000 cu ft/s). was reached. During August 2010, when flooding occurred in Jaén, Córdoba and Seville, three people died in Córdoba.

=== Pollution ===
The Doñana disaster, also known as the Aznalcóllar Disaster or Guadiamar Disaster, was an industrial accident in Andalusia. In April 1998 a holding dam burst at the Los Frailes mine, near Aznalcóllar, Seville Province, releasing 4 to 5 million cubic metres (140 to 180 million cubic feet) of mine tailings. The Doñana National Park was also affected by this event.

== Dams and bridges ==
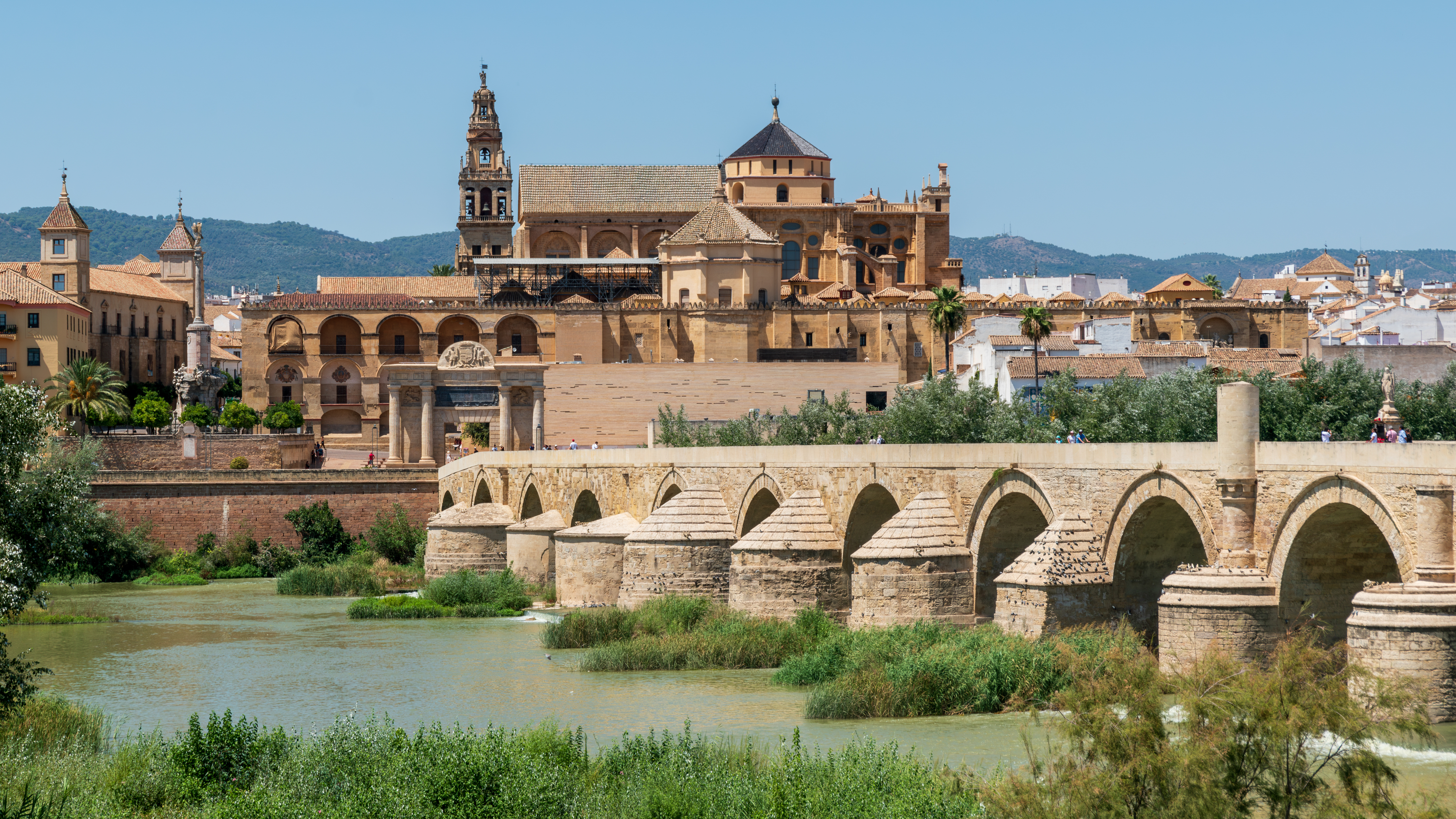
Views of the historic centre of Córdoba from the Guadalquivir River.

Of the numerous bridges spanning the Guadalquivir, one of the oldest is the Roman bridge of Córdoba. Significant bridges at Seville include the Puente del Alamillo (1992), Puente de Isabel II or Puente de Triana (1852), and Puente del Centenario (completed in 1992).

The El Tranco de Beas Dam at the head of the river was built between 1929 and 1944 as a hydroelectricity project of the Franco regime. Doña Aldonza Dam is located in the Guadalquivir riverbed, in the Andalusian municipalities of Úbeda, Peal de Becerro and Torreperogil in the province of Jaén.

== Ports ==
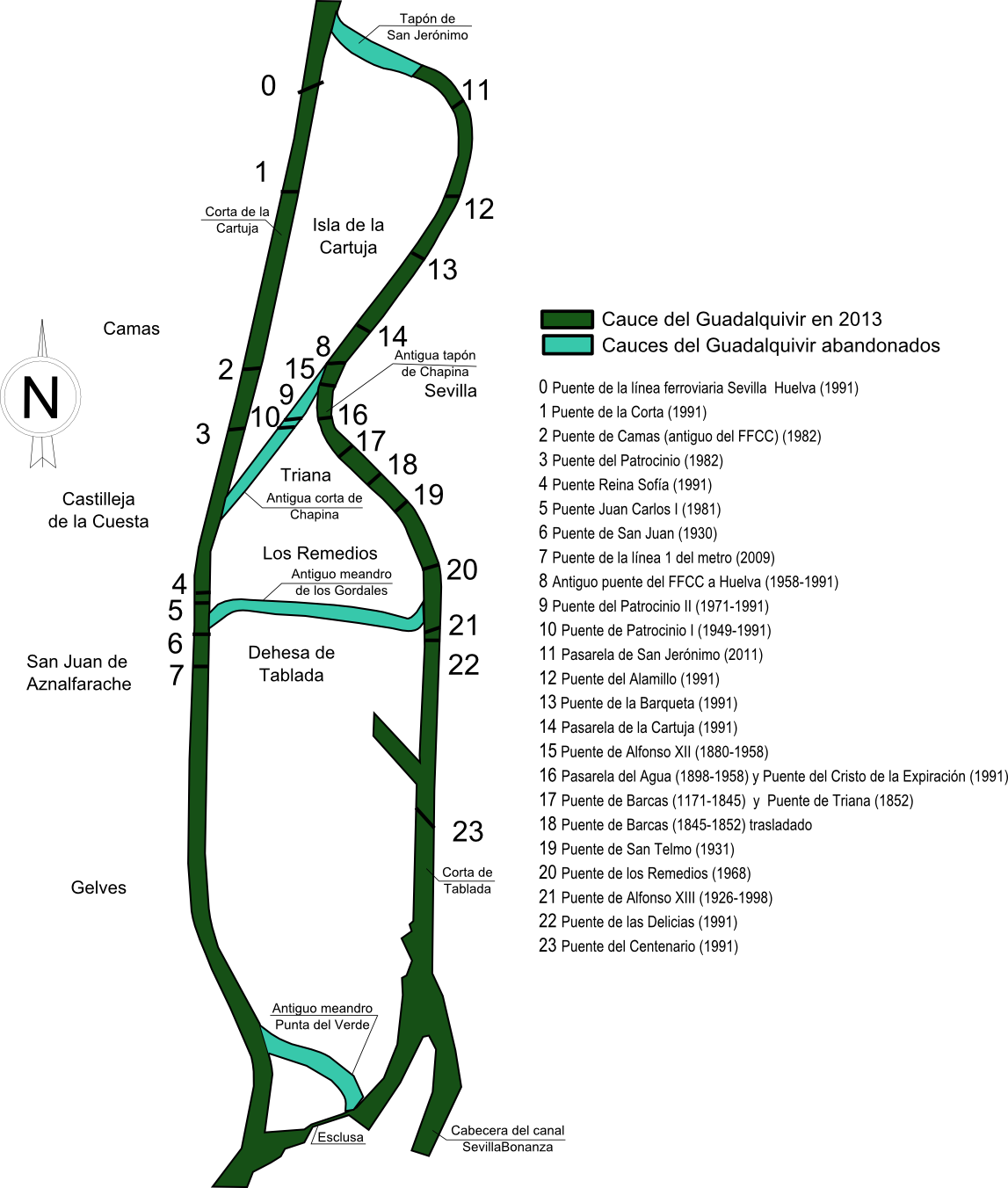
Map of Port of Seville showing existing (dark green) and abandoned river divisions (pale green)

The Port of Seville is the main port on the Guadalquivir River. The Port Authority of Seville is responsible for developing, managing, operating, and marketing the Port of Seville.

The entrance to the Port of Seville is protected by a lock that regulates the water level, making the port free of tidal influences. The Port of Seville has over 2,700 m (8,900 ft) of berths for public use and 1,100 m (3,600 ft) of private berths. These docks and berths are used for solid and liquid bulk cargoes, roll-on/roll-off cargoes, containers, private vessels and cruise ships.

In 2001, the Port of Seville handled almost 4.9 million tonnes (5.4 million short tons) of cargo, including 3.0 million tonnes (3.3 million short tons) of solid bulk, 1.6 million tonnes (1.8 million short tons) of general cargo, and over 264,000 tonnes (291,000 short tons) of liquid bulk. Almost 1,500 vessels brought cargo into the port, including more than 101,000 TEUs of containerized cargo.

== See also ==
- List of rivers of Spain
- Regata Sevilla-Betis
