= Alfonso of Molina =

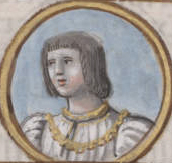

Lord of Molina and Mesa
- Reign: 1239–1272
- Predecessor: Mafalda González de Lara
- Successor: Blanca Alfonso de Molina
- Co-ruler: Mafalda González de Lara
- Born: 1202; León, Spain
- Died: 6 January 1272 (aged 70); Salamanca, Spain
- Burial: Monastery of St. Francis in Salamanca
- Spouse: Mafalda González de Lara; Teresa González de Lara; Mayor Alfonso de Meneses
- Issue among others...: Maria, Queen of Castile
- House: Castilian House of Ivrea
- Father: Alfonso IX of León
- Mother: Berengaria of Castile
- Religion: Roman Catholicism

Alfonso of León, Lord of Molina (1202 – 6 January 1272) was an infante (prince) of León and Castile, the son of King Alfonso IX of León and his second wife Queen Berengaria of Castile. He was the brother of King Ferdinand III of Castile and León, and father of Queen Maria of Molina, wife of King Sancho IV. He became Lord of Molina and Mesa after his first marriage to Mafalda González de Lara, the heiress of those lands.

== Family origins ==
Alfonso was the son of King Alfonso IX of León and his second wife, Queen Berengaria of Castile. On his father's side he was the grandson of King Ferdinand II of León and his first wife, Urraca of Portugal. On his mother's side his grandparents were King Alfonso VIII of Castile and his wife, Eleanor of England. His siblings included King Ferdinand III of Castile and León, Berengaria, Constance, and Eleanor.

== Biography ==
Alfonso was born near León in 1202. As the son of Alfonso IX of León and Berengaria of Castile, he witnessed the bad relations between the two kingdoms during his childhood, after the annulment of his parents' marriage. At the Battle of Navas de Tolosa (1212), his father and the King of Portugal were the only kings from the Iberian Peninsula who did not take part, in contrast to those of Castile, Aragon, and Navarre. In fact, Alfonso IX took advantage of the absence of his cousin Alfonso VIII to invade Castile.

In 1222, Ferdinand III found himself at odds with Gonzalo Pérez de Lara, Lord of Molina, due to the latter's support of Alfonso IX. But the two kings managed to come to terms, ratifying the Treaty of Zafra in 1223. Berengaria played an active role in the negotiations. The aim of Gonzalo's martial actions, including the devastation of some villages near Medinaceli, was to foment an uprising of Castilian nobles against Ferdinand in support of his father.

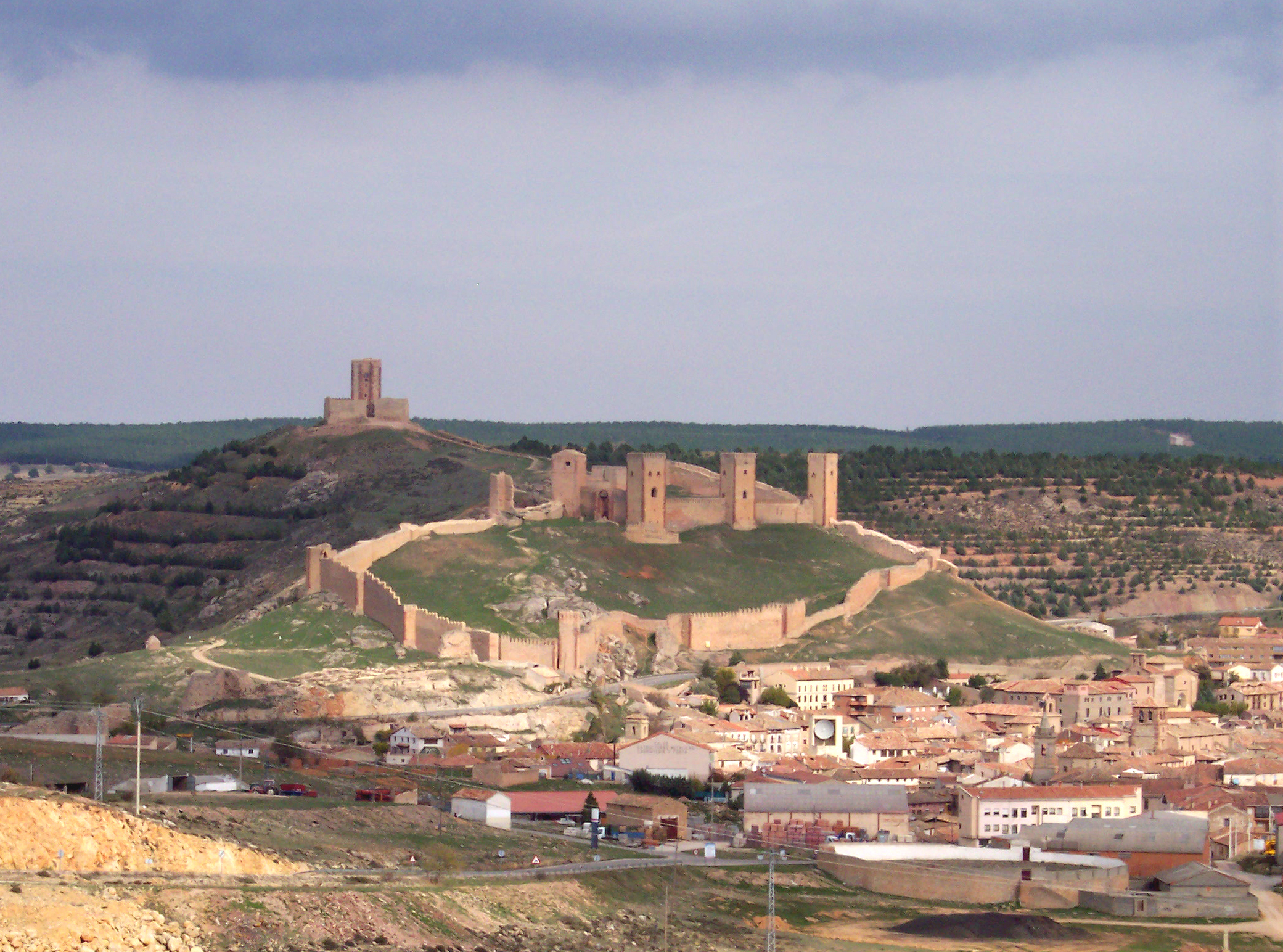
View of the castle of Molina de Aragón, seat of the Lordship of Molina.

Ferdinand was now bitterly opposed to the autonomy enjoyed by Gonzalo and his family, the House of Lara, one of the most powerful in the realm alongside that of Haro. He laid siege to the Castle of Zafra, where Gonzalo took refuge with his retainers and family. Gonzalo ultimately surrendered and accepted the conditions imposed on him. The first of these was that the Lordship of Molina would not, upon his death, pass to Gonzalo's son, Pedro González de Lara "the Disinherited", but rather to his daughter Mafalda González de Lara, who would meanwhile marry infante Alfonso de Molina. Thus the Crown would establish control over the Lordship of Molina. The Treaty of Zafra was the prelude to the future annexation of the Lordship of Molina by the Crown of Castile. Pedro Gonzalez de Lara "the Disinherited" left for the Kingdom of Aragon and always considered himself the legitimate lord of Molina. In his last will, executed in 1268, he bequeathed the lordship to infante Fernando de la Cerda, the first-born son of King Alfonso X of Castile.

The marriage between Alfonso of Molina and Mafalda González de Lara took place in 1240, and upon the death of Mafalda's father, Gonzalo Pérez de Lara, infante Alfonso, through his wife, became Lord of Molina in 1243 and governed the lordship for the rest of his life, at first jointly with his wife, and then, after her death, alone, just as stipulated in the marriage contract. He, and later his daughter Blanca, expanded the provisions of the fueros of the Lordship of Molina.

According to contemporary chroniclers, Alfonso of Molina was a man possessed of considerable virtues as well as a calm temperament. In 1230, on the death of his father Alfonso IX, he could have sought the throne of León, since Alfonso IX did not wish to bequeath it to his other son Ferdinand III, who was already King of Castile. In fact Alfonso IX named as his heirs his two daughters, infantas Sancha and Dulce. However, thanks to a substantial financial compensation, they renounced the throne of León in the Treaty of Benavente, ratified with Ferdinand in the presence of the many magnates and prelates of the realm. Alfonso of Molina, who had previously refused the throne, was rewarded by the king with his favor, with distinctions, and with many gifts, lands, and privileges. He accompanied his brother on most of his military campaigns and was closely identified with the cause of the Reconquista as well as whatever enterprises the king might undertake.

== Campaign in Andalusia and the Battle of Jerez (1231) ==
In 1231, while he visited the main cities of León after having taken possession of it, Ferdinand reportedly sent his son Infante Alfonso, then nine years of age and living in Salamanca, to lay waste to the Almohad Caliphate territories around Córdoba and Seville, accompanied by Álvaro Pérez "the Castilian" de Castro and the magnate Gil Manrique. Nevertheless, various historians have indicated that the infante Alfonso to which contemporary chronicles refer was not the king's son, but rather his brother, Alfonso of Molina. But according to the version which holds that the infante Alfonso present at the Battle of Jerez was actually King Fernando III's son, "he sent Don Alvar de Castro, the Castilian, to go with him, to watch over the infante and as commander of the army, for the infante was very young and not yet so energetic, and Don Alvar Pérez was a respected and very energetic man."

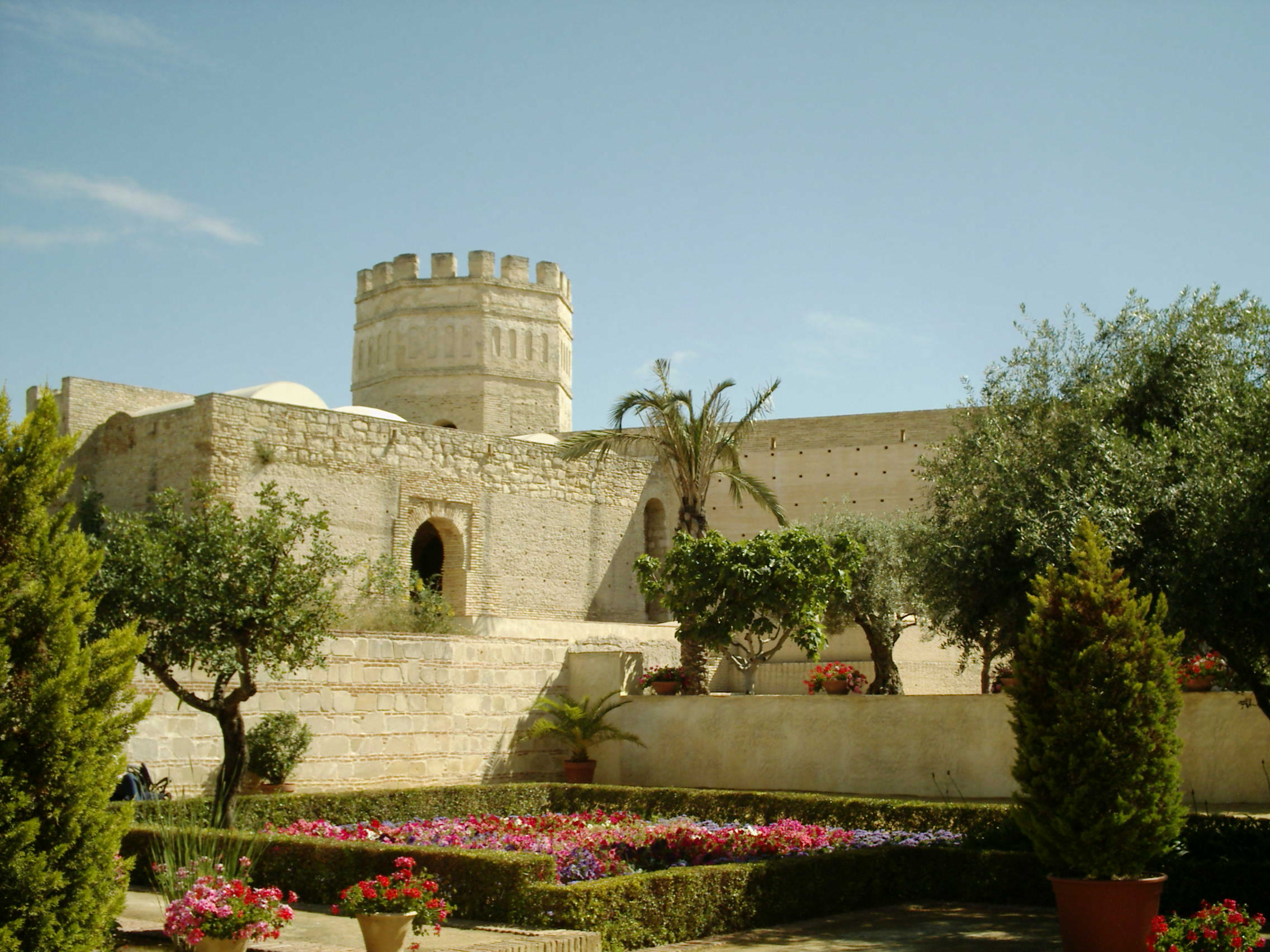
View of the alcázar of Jerez de la Frontera. The Battle of Jerez, waged in 1231, spelt defeat for the forces of the Emir of Al-Andalus.

From Salamanca, and passing through Toledo where they were joined by 40 knights, they made their way toward Andújar. From there, they began to devastate the countryside around Cordoba, and later the provincial town of Palma del Río. They exterminated all the inhabitants and seized the town, then proceeded toward Seville and Jerez de la Frontera, and camped there near the Guadalete River. Emir Ibn Hud, who had gathered a large army of seven divisions, positioned himself between the Castilians and Jerez, forcing them to give battle. During the subsequent engagement, known as the Battle of Jerez, the Castilians defeated Ibn Hud in spite of his numerical superiority. Later, King Alfonso X referred to the 1231 battle as follows: "It is fitting that you who are hearing this story know that the thing in the world that most broke the Moors, why they had to lose Andalusia and the Christians gain it from them, was this battle of Jerez. That is how the Moors were shattered. They could never again muster the daring nor the effort which they had previously against the Christians, such was the level of the shock and fear they experienced on that occasion."

After his victory in the Battle of Jerez, Álvaro Pérez de Castro the Castilian returned to Castile and handed Infante Alfonso over to his father the king, who was in Palencia.

== Conquests of Cordoba and Seville and actions during the reign of Alfonso X (1236–1272) ==
In 1236, Alfonso of Molina distinguished himself in the conquest of Cordoba, the old capital of the Caliphate of Cordoba. Twelve years later, in 1248, he took part in the siege of Seville and captured the Torre de Oro. He also occupied a part of the Álcazar of Seville, which was known as the "Walls of the Infante of Molina".

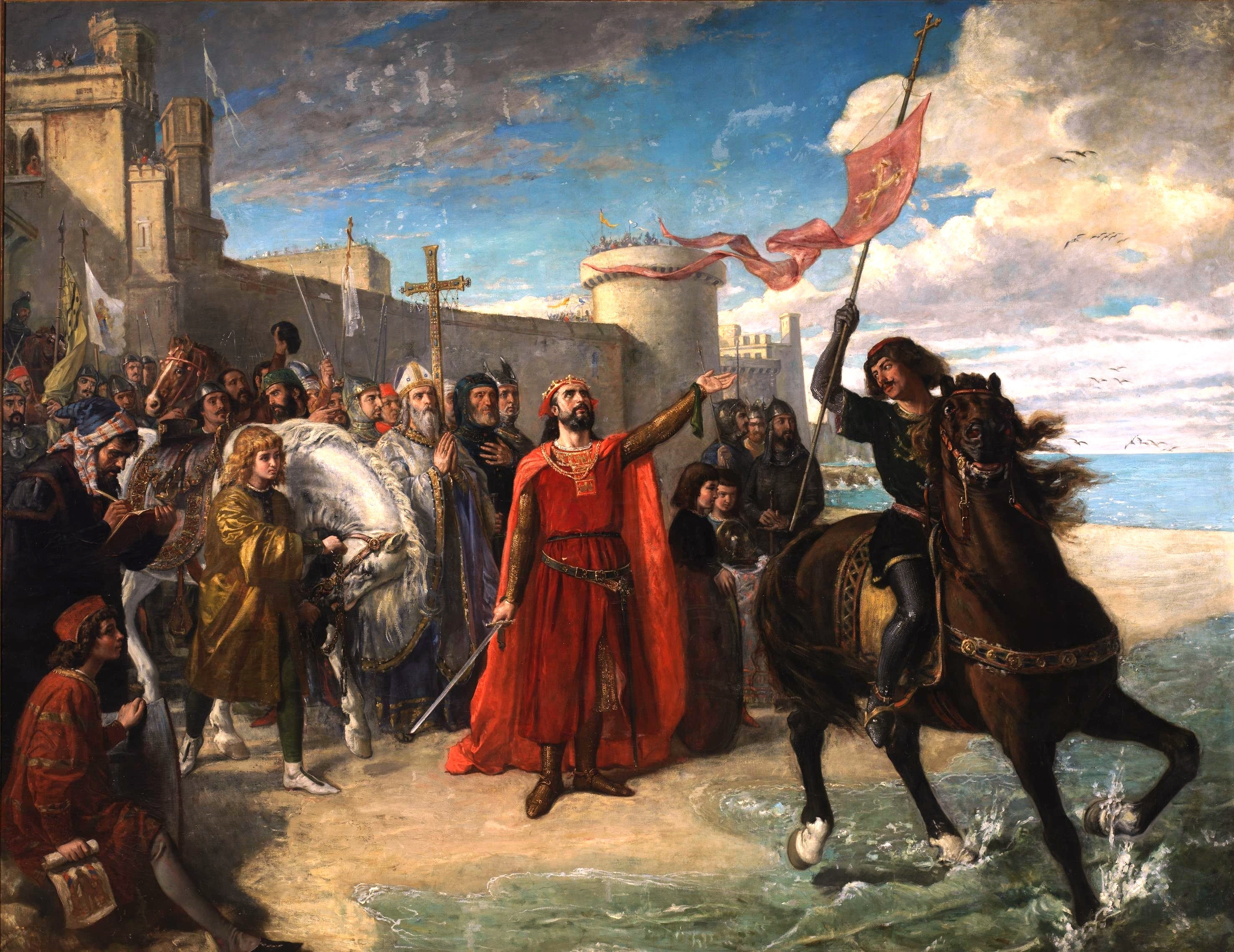
Alfonso X taking possession of the sea after the conquest of Cádiz. Matías Moreno. 1866.

In the division of the territory of Seville proclaimed on 1 May 1253, almost a year after the death of his brother Ferdinand III and during the reign of his nephew Alfonso X, Infante Alfonso of Molina received large grants and was one of the greatest beneficiaries of the land distribution due to his status as younger brother of Ferdinand III. The late king had asked his son Alfonso X in his will to hold him in high regard.

== Later life ==
In 1254, he entered the Order of Calatrava, obliged to wear their habit and assured that on his death his body would be buried in the order's main monastery. He attended the Valladolid Cortes of 1258, whose main purpose was to obtain money to fund Alfonso X's designs on the throne of the Holy Roman Empire. He also attended the Toledo Cortes of 1259, whose purpose was the same, and the Jerez Council of 1268. He attended the wedding of Infante Fernando de la Cerda, first-born son and heir of Alfonso X, to Blanche of France, held in Burgos on 30 November 1269.

== Death and burial ==
In his 1254 will, made at the time he entered the Order of Calatrava, Alfonso of Molina stipulated that he be buried in the church of the castle of Calatrava la Nueva, headquarters of the order, located in what is today Ciudad Real province.

Alfonso of Molina died in Salamanca on 6 January 1272, aged 70. Alfonso's body was provisionally buried in the monastery of San Francisco in Salamanca, which is no longer extant. Later, his remains were transferred to Calatrava la Nueva as specified in his will, and placed in a sumptuous sepulchre which lay under an arch in the main chapel of the monastery's church. This sepulchre and his remains have not survived to the present day.

== Marriage and children ==
Alfonso of Molina married, in 1240, Mafalda González de Lara, Lady of Molina, daughter of Gonzalo Pérez de Lara, 3rd Lord of Molina and Mesa, and his wife, Sancha Gómez de Trava. They had two children:

- Fernando Alfonso of Molina (1242–1250).
- Blanca Alfonso of Molina (1243–1292), who inherited the Lordship of Molina after her father's death. In 1269, she married Alfonso Fernández de Castilla, illegitimate son of Alfonso X.

In 1244, widowed of his first wife, he married his second, Teresa González de Lara, daughter of Count Gonzalo Núñez de Lara, Lord of Belorado, and his wife María Díaz I de Haro (daughter of Diego López II de Haro). They had a daughter:

- Juana Alfonso of Molina (1245/1246- after 1307), in 1269 married Lope Díaz III de Haro, Lord of Biscay, who was killed by Sancho IV of Castile in Alfaro in 1288. She was the mother of Diego López IV de Haro (died 1289) and María Díaz I de Haro, Lady of Biscay, who married infante John of Castile "el de Tarifa".

He married, in 1260 as this third wife, Mayor Alfonso de Meneses (c. 1230 – after 1265), Lady of Meneses and Villanueva, widow of Gonzalo Gil of Villalobos and daughter of Alfonso Téllez de Meneses "el Mozo", 4th Lord of Meneses, San Román and Villanueva, and his first wife María Yáñez de Lima. They had two children:

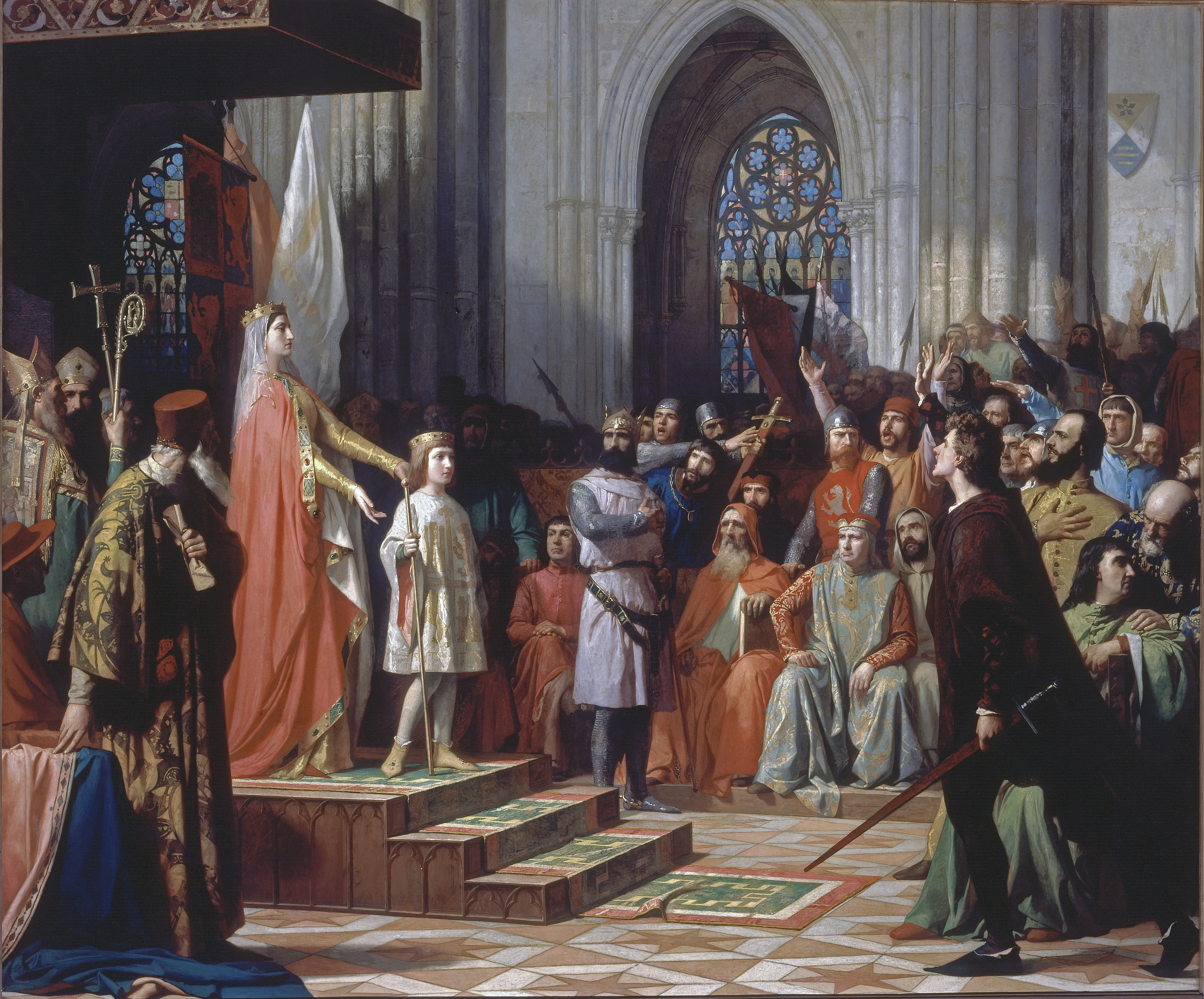
Maria of Molina presents her son Ferdinand IV, grandson of Infante Alfonso of Molina, to the Valladolid Cortes of 1295. Oil on canvas by Antonio Gisbert Pérez. 1863.

- Alfonso Téllez of Molina (1262–1314), 7th Lord of Meneses and Lord of Tiedra, Montealegre, Grajal, Alba de Liste, San Román and San Felices. He was also the proprietor of half of the lordship of Alburquerque. He was commander-in-chief for Sancho IV of Castile from 10 December 1288 to 25 April 1295. He married Teresa Pérez of Asturias, daughter of Pedro Álvarez of Asturias, Lord of Noreña, and his wife Sancha Rodríguez of Lara. They had at least a son, Tello Alfonso de Meneses, Lord of Meneses, who married Maria of Portugal, Lady of Meneses and Orduña.
- Maria of Molina (c. 1260 – 1321), Queen Consort of Castile by her marriage to her cousin Sancho IV of Castile, son of Alfonso X and Queen Violant of Aragon. They were the parents of King Ferdinand IV of Castile. She was buried in the Abbey of Santa María la Real de las Huelgas in Valladolid.

Alfonso of Molina also had several illegitimate children from various extramarital relationships: (Note: Alfonso, according to Szabolcs de Vajay, was the father of Teresa Alfonso, wife of Nuño González de Lara. For Teresa's filiation, see articles on Alfonso IX of León and Aldonza Martínez de Silva.)

- Juan Alfonso of Molina (1225–1293) was declared legitimate by Pope Innocent IV in a bull published 14 October 1243. He was dean of Burgos Cathedral, and later Bishop of Palencia from 1278 to 1293. In order to be named Bishop of Palencia he had to receive a dispensation, which was published by Pope Alexander IV on 24 January 1259.
- Urraca Alfonso (1225/1230? - ?) married García Gómez Carrillo "el de los Garfios" ('he of the hooks'), lord of Mazuelo and defender of the fortress of Jerez de la Frontera.
- Berengaria Fernández (1230/1235? - 1272), Lady of Melgoso and Caldelas, she was the daughter of the Portuguese noblewoman Teresa Fernández de Bragança. She married, in 1251, Gonzalo Ramírez, son of Ramiro Froilaz and his wife Aldonza González Girón. They had no children, and Berengaria became the mistress of James I the Conqueror, King of Aragon with whom she had Pedro Fernández, lord of Híjar.
- Leonor Alfonso (1230/1235 - ?) married Alfonso García de Villamayor, Lord of Villamayor, Celada, and Sisamón, and son of García Fernández de Villamayor and his wife Mayor Arias. Her husband was adelantado mayor of Andalusia and Mayordomo mayor (royal high steward) for Alfonso X.
- Juana Alfonso (1266 - ?). In 1283 she received a gift from Alfonso X.
