= Alfonso de Castilla y Molina =

Arms of the infante Alfonso de Castilla y Molina.

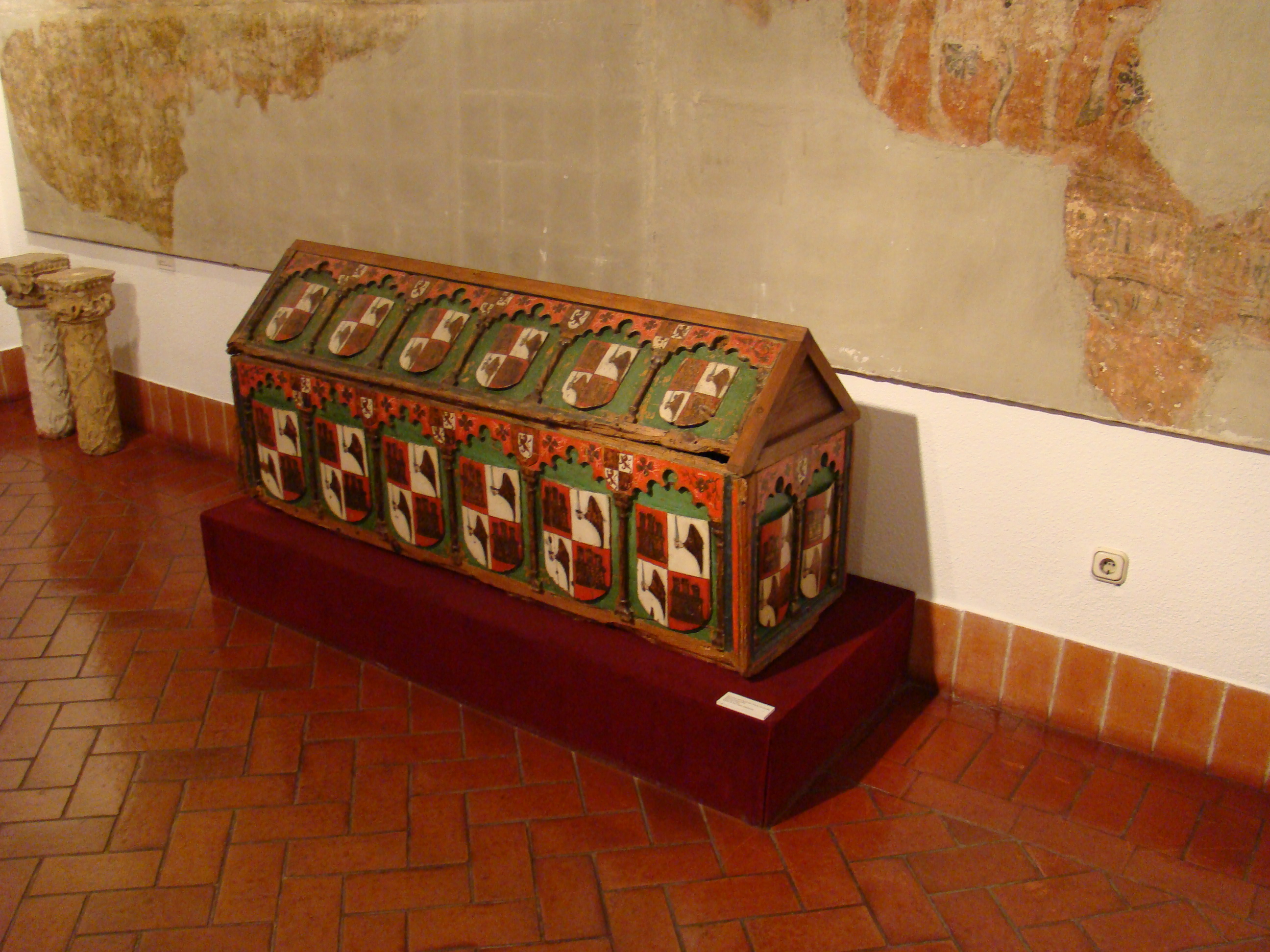
Ataúd of the infante Alfonso de Castilla. Museo de Valladolid.

Alfonso de Castilla y Molina (1286 in Valladolid – 1291 in Valladolid) was a Spanish noble in the service of the Kingdom of Castile. He was an Infante de Castilla, son of King Sancho IV de Castilla, King of Castile and of his wife, the Queen María de Molina.

== Family origins ==
Alfonso was the son of King Sancho IV of Castile and his wife the queen, María de Molina. His paternal grandparents were Alfonso X of Castile and his wife, Violant of Hungary, herself the daughter of James I of Aragon. His maternal grandparents were the infante Alfonso de Molina, son of Alfonso IX of Leon and his third wife, Mayor Alfonso de Meneses. He was the brother of Ferdinand IV of Castile Pedro de Castilla y Molina, Felipe, Enrique de Castilla y Molina, Beatriz and Isabella, amongst others.

== Biography ==
Alfonso was born in Valladolid in 1286.

Towards the end of 1291, King Sancho IV of Castile and Juan Núñez I de Lara, head of the House of Lara, in the effort to forge a political alliance, decided to betroth Alfonso to Juana Núñez de Lara, Juan Núñez I's eldest daughter. He was 5 years old at the time. Alfonso did not survive the year however and the subsequent political alliance fell apart as Juan Núñez I went into self-imposed exile and rebellion against Sancho IV. Alfonso de Castilla y Molina died in Valladolid in 1291 at five years of age.

== Death, burial and legacy ==
After his death, Alfonso's body was sepulchered at the San Pablo Church of Valladolid, one of the churches of the Dominican Order. In the Museo de Valladolid, located in the Palacio de Fabio Nelli. On display is the actual sepulcher and the clothes that the infante was buried in.
