= Siege of Córdoba (1236) =

Military engagement

- Part of the Reconquista
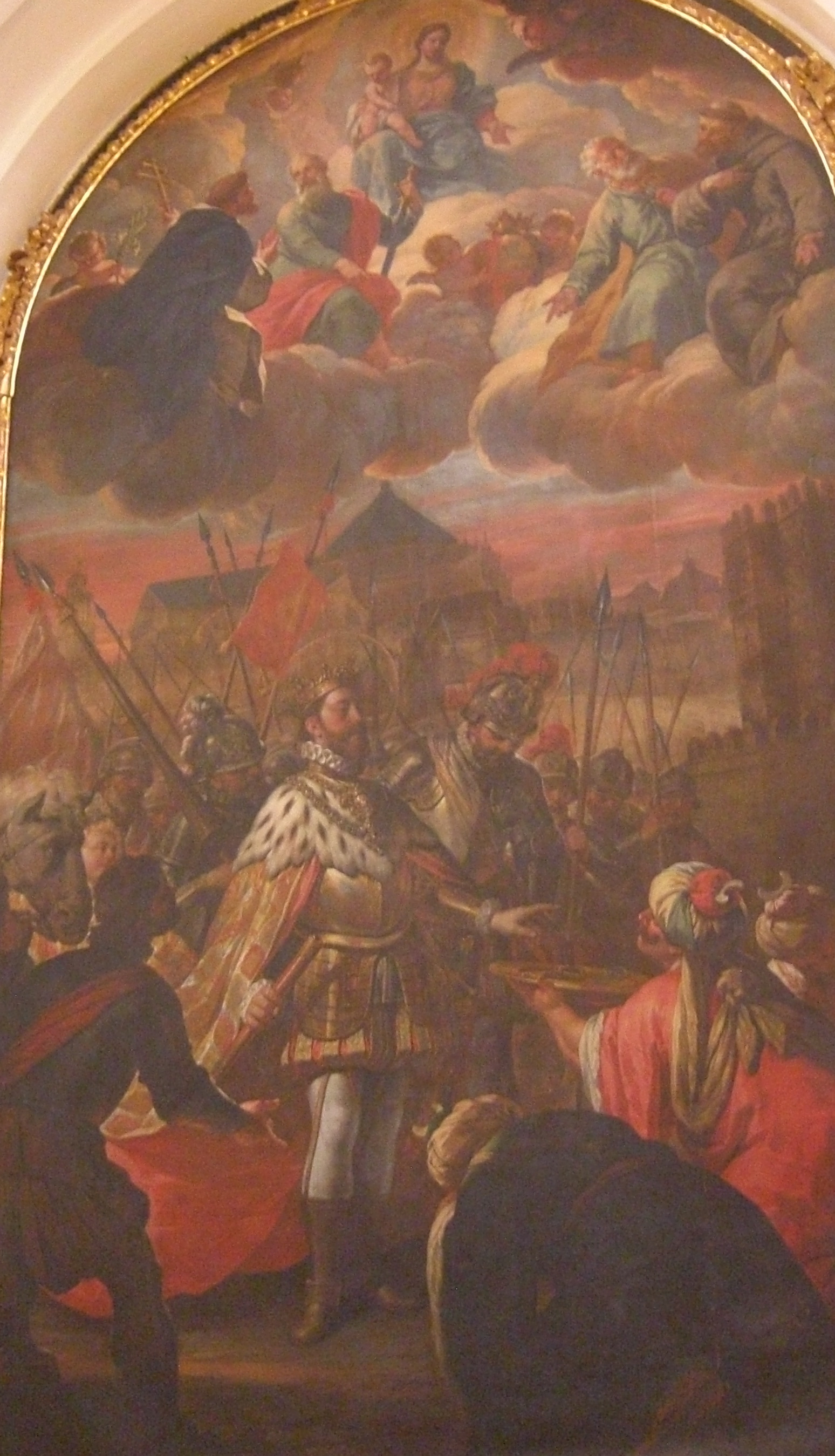
- The conquest of Córdoba by Ferdinand III the Saint, by Antonio Palomino. Chapel of Saint Teresa of the Mosque-Cathedral of Córdoba (Spain).
Date	June 29, 1236
Location	Córdoba
Result	Castilian victory

Belligerents
Crown of Castile	Taifa of Córdoba

Commanders and leaders
Ferdinand III of Castile	Abul-l-Casan; Lorenzo Suárez; Ibn Hud

During the Reconquista, the siege of Córdoba (Spanish: Conquista de Córdoba, Conquest of Córdoba) was a successful investment by the forces of Ferdinand III, king of Castile and León, marking the end of the Islamic rule over the city that had begun in 711.

== Siege ==
Upon receiving information that part of the inhabitants of the eastern quarter of Cordoba, Axerquía, were disaffected with their rulers, a handful of almogávars led by knights acting on their own initiative scaled a tower during a rainy winter night of 1235–1236. After meeting their contacts inside, they eventually seized control of the neighborhood. The almogávars, some of whom spoke Arabic, were likely employed as Castilian border guards in the Andújar region, where they assembled before mounting their daring operation.

The whole episode has been subject to varying interpretations. The Primera Crónica General highlighted the heroic act of the leading knights, while later Spanish historian Julio González emphasized that help from within city walls must have been a significant factor in the success of this takeover, for it met with little opposition in Axerquía. After the city fell to Ferdinand, a tower and nearby gate in Axerquía were named after Alvaro Colodro, a knight who was reported to have led the climb. The date of this coup de main likely occurred in last week of 1235.

The Christian soldiers killed a number of the Muslim inhabitants of Axerquía, and some survivors took refuge in the Al Medina quarter, the sociopolitical center of the city. Because an inner wall separated the two quarters, a bloody standoff followed, with significant losses on both sides, but with neither being able to make significant progress. The Christians immediately sent word to neighboring border forces, most notably those of Álvaro Pérez de Castro, who reinforced them, and they also asked king Ferdinand for help.

The event took Ferdinand by surprise, as he had recently concluded a truce with Ibn Hud. Ferdinand rode with a small band of knights and arrived at Córdoba on February 7, 1236, after traveling through rainstorms and a flooded country.

== Aftermath ==
The Siege of Córdoba, culminating in Ferdinand III's capture of the city, was a turning point in the Reconquista, consolidating Christian control over Al-Andalus. The event also left a lasting impact on Córdoba's cultural and architectural landscape, as Christian rulers sought to integrate Islamic influences into their domains.

In capturing the city, Ferdinand benefited from the rivalry between the two main competing taifa rulers following the dissolution of the Almohad authority, itself triggered by the Battle of Las Navas de Tolosa.
