= Las Huelgas Reales Monastery =

Las Huelgas Reales Monastery may refer to:

- Abbey of Santa María la Real de Las Huelgas, Burgos, Spain
- Monastery of Santa María la Real de las Huelgas, Valladolid, Spain

The monastery in Burgos is probably the better-known of the two.
