= Alfonso Téllez de Meneses =

Alfonso Téllez de Meneses may refer to:

- Alfonso Téllez de Meneses el Viejo (the Old), Castilian nobleman, died 1230
- Alfonso Téllez de Meneses el Mozo (the Young), his son, died 1257
