= Alfonso Téllez de Meneses el Mozo =

Medieval Spanish nobleman (died 1257)

Alfonso Téllez de Meneses el Mozo was a medieval nobleman. Alfonso ("the Young"; died c. 1257), married María Anes de Limia, daughter of Juan Fernández, tenant-in-chief in Limia y Monterroso, and Maria Pais Ribeira "a Ribeirinha". Alfonso and María had three children, including, Mayor Alfonso de Meneses, the wife of infante Alfonso de Molina, and mother of Queen María de Molina and her brother Alfonso Téllez de Molina, Lord of Meneses and alférez to the king.

== Sources ==
- Salcedo Tapia, Modesto (1999). La familia Téllez de Meneses en los tronos de Castilla y Portugal (in Spanish). Palencia: Institución Tello Téllez de Meneses CECEL-CSIC, y Diputación de Palencia, Departamento de Cultura. ISBN 848173-070-X.
