= Mayor Alfonso de Meneses =

Castilian noblewoman (c.1230–1284)

Mayor Alfonso de Meneses (c. 1230 – c. 1284) was a Castilian noblewoman. She was the daughter of Alfonso Téllez de Meneses and Elvira Rodríguez. She had two brothers, Tello II and Alfonso, and a sister, Teresa. She was raised at the court of Ferdinand III of Castile and married his younger brother, Alfonso de Molina, in 1260. From her father and her brothers she inherited the lordships of Meneses, Montealegre and Tiedra. With Alfonso de Molina, she had a son, also Alfonso, who inherited Meneses, and a daughter, María de Molina, who married the future King Sancho IV.

Mayor was dead by 1284. She was buried in the monastery of Santa María de Palazuelos.
