= María de Molina =

Queen of Castile and León from 1284 to 1295

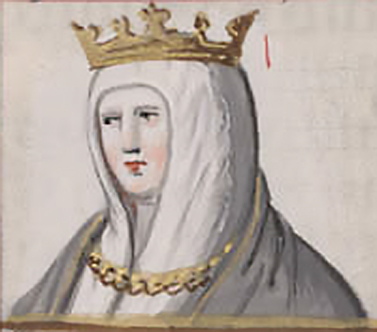

Queen consort of Castile and León
- Tenure: 1284–1295
- Born: c. 1265
- Died: 1 July 1321 (aged 55-56); Valladolid
- Burial: Santa María la Real de las Huelgas (Valladolid)
- Spouse: Sancho IV of Castile (m. 1282; died 1295)
- Issue among others...: Isabella, Queen of Aragon; Ferdinand IV, King of Castile; Beatrice, Queen of Portugal
Names
- María Alfonso de Meneses
- House: Castilian House of Ivrea
- Father: Alfonso of Molina
- Mother: Mayor Alfonso de Meneses

María Alfonso Téllez de Meneses (c. 1265 – 1321), known as María de Molina, was queen consort of Castile and León from 1284 to 1295 by marriage to Sancho IV of Castile, and served as regent for her minor son Ferdinand IV (1295 - c.1301) and later her grandson Alfonso XI of Castile (1312-1321).

== Queenship ==
María was the daughter of the infante Alfonso of Molina and Mayor Alfonso de Meneses. Her paternal grandparents were King Alfonso IX of León and Queen Berengaria of Castile. She married her first cousin-once removed Sancho in 1282, although the matrimonial dispensation for kinship was not previously granted. Upon the death of his father, Alfonso X, the couple became king and queen of Castile and León. She was crowned alongside her husband in the cathedral of Toledo. Although the couple was pressured to separate by Rome and others, Sancho chose to honor his wife and delegated many responsibilities to her, including the regency of their son after his death. His reign was short since he died in 1295.

== First regency ==
Coat of arms as Queen of Castile

After the death of Sancho IV, he was succeeded by their eldest son Ferdinand IV, who was under age. Though according to the Crónica de Sancho IV, Sancho designated María as the sole regent, she was forced to share the regency with Sancho's uncle, Henry the Senator, younger brother of Alfonso X. Ferdinand's rule was challenged by a coalition that included his uncle, John, his cousins the infantes de la Cerda, sons of the infante Ferdinand de la Cerda, eldest son of Alfonso X, as well as King James II of Aragón and King Denis of Portugal. Through marriage alliances, gifts of territories, and shrewd politics María was able to lead Ferdinand's cause to victory, though it did not come easily. María built her own coalition, relying on the Castilian Cortes to confirm her authority and playing the powerful family of Haro against the Laras, who supported the opposition. Civil war continued for several years, and María's coregent Henry was often more of an antagonist than a defender of his great-nephew's cause.

Around 1300, the alliance against Ferdinand began to crumble when one of his principal enemies, Juan Núñez de Lara, was captured and later reconciled to the young king. Portugal returned to allegiance with Ferdinand with the promise of a marriage between the Portuguese princess Constance and the young king of Castile. María's victory for her son seemed sealed in 1301, when she finally received a papal bull from Pope Boniface VIII, legitimizing her marriage and her children. Eventually, only Aragon was left to support the claim of Alfonso de la Cerda and his brother, which was finally set aside in a treaty between Castile and Aragon a few years later.

María's son died in 1312 and was succeeded by his son, Alfonso XI. As the new king was a minor, Maria became regent again. She died in Valladolid in 1321.

== Infancy of Ferdinand IV (1295-1301) ==
On April 25, 1295, King Sancho IV died, leaving the infant Fernando as the heir. The king was buried in the Cathedral of Toledo, María de Molina withdrew to the original Alcázar of Toledo to observe a nine day mourning period. The queen was in charge of exercising his guardianship during her son’s childhood, who was only nine years old. Due to the illegitimacy of her son Ferdinand, caused by the illegitimate marriage of her parents, the queen had to overcome many difficulties to get her son to stay on the throne.

To the never-ending struggles with the Castilian nobility, commanded by Prince Juan of Castile of Tarifa, who claimed the throne from his brother Sancho IV, and by Prince Enrique of Castile the Senator, son of Fernando III of Castile and uncle of Fernando IV, who claimed the guardianship of the king, joined in the fight with Princes of the Cerda, supported by France and Aragon and by their queen grandmother, Violant of Aragon, widow of Alfonso X. On top of this were the problems with Aragon, Portugal, and France, who attempted to take advantage of the kingdom of Castile’s instability for their own benefit. At the same time, Diego López V of Haro, Lord of Vizcaya, Nuño González of Lara, and Juan Núñez of Lara, among many others, spread confusion and anarchy in the kingdom. In the Courts of Valladolid in 1295, Prince Enrique of Castile the Senator was named guardian of the king, but the queen obtained custody of her son through the support of the cities with a vote in the Courts. While the Courts of Valladolid in 1295 were being held, Prince Juan of Castile of Tarifa left Granada and attempted to occupy the city of Badajoz, but after failing in his attempt, he seized Coria and the castle of Alcántara. Later he went to the kingdom of Portugal, where he pressured King Dionisio I of Portugal to declare war on the kingdoms of Castile and Leon and, at the same time, to give him support in his claims to the Castilian-Leonese throne.

In the summer of 1295, the Valladolid Courts of that year ended, Queen María of Molina and Prince Enrique met in Ciudad Rodrigo with King Dionisio I of Portugal, to whom the Queen gave several squares next to the Portuguese border. In the Ciudad Rodrigo meeting it was agreed that Ferdinand IV would marry the Infanta Constanza of Portugal, the King of Portugal’s daughter, and that the Infanta Beatriz of Castile, Ferdinand IV's sister, would marry Prince Alfonso, the heir to the Portuguese throne. At the same time, Diego López V de Haro had possession of the lordship of Vizcaya confirmed, and the infant Juan, who momentarily accepted Fernando IV as sovereign in private, had his properties restored. Shortly after, Jaime II de Aragon returned the Infanta Isabel de Castilla to the Castilian court, without having married her, and declared war on the kingdom of Castilla y León.

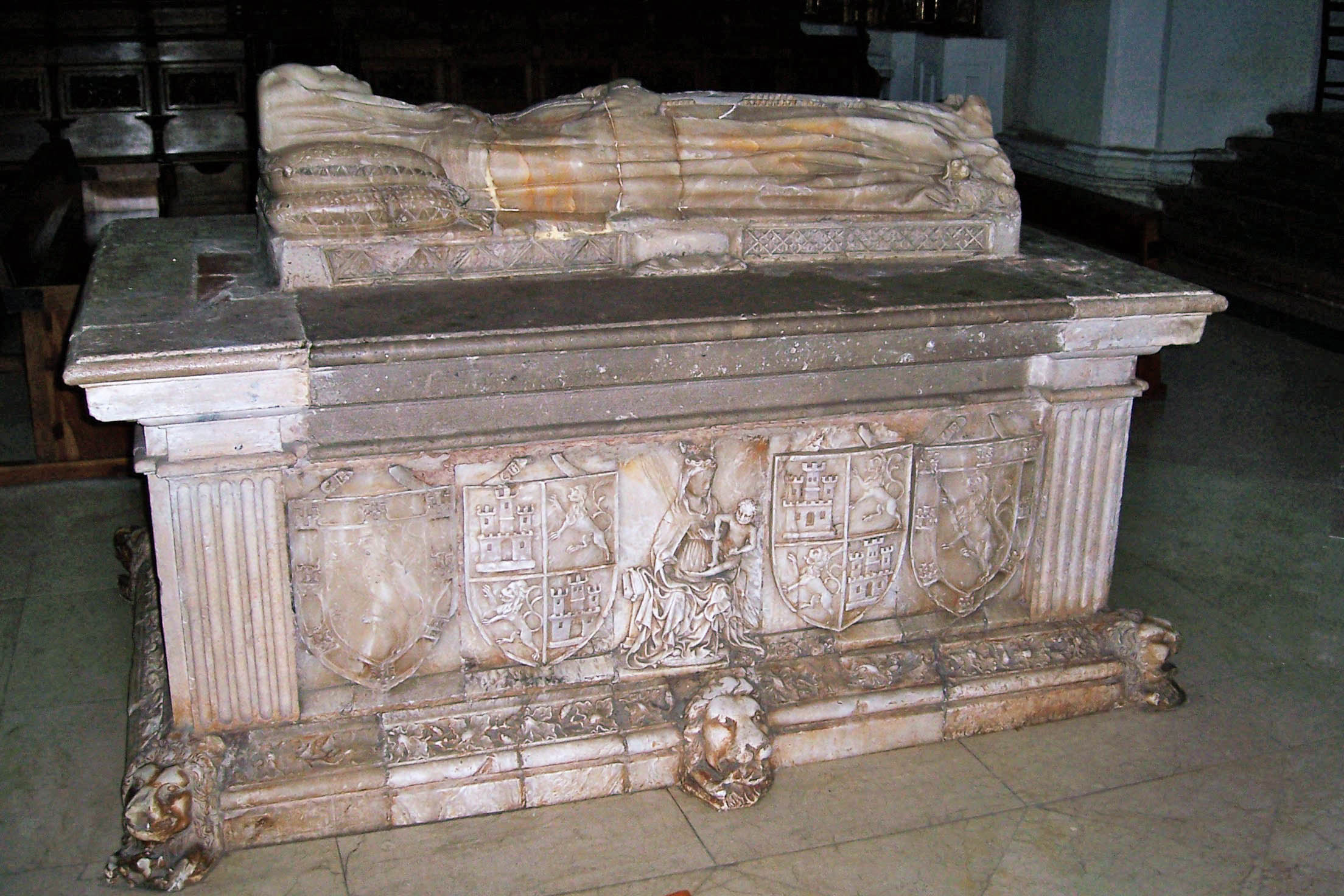
Sepulchre of María

At the beginning of 1296, Prince Juan of Castile of Tarifa, who had rebelled against Fernando IV, took Astudillo, Paredes de Nava and Dueñas, while his son Alfonso de Valencia took control of Mansilla. In April 1296, Alfonso of the Cerda invaded the kingdom of Castilla and León accompanied by Aragon troops, and went to the city of León, where Prince Juan was proclaimed the King of León, Seville, and Galicia. Directly after, Prince Juan accompanied Alfonso of the Cerda to Sahagún, where he was proclaimed king of Castile, Toledo, Córdoba, Murcia, and Jaén. Soon after Alfonso of the Cerda and Prince Juan were crowned, both surrounded the Valladolid municipality of Mayorga, Prince Enrique left at the same time for the Nasrid kingdom of Granada to reach peace between the Granada monarch and Fernando IV, because at the time the Granadans attacked the lands of the king throughout Andalusia, which were defended, among others, by Alonso Pérez de Guzmán. On August 25, 1296, Prince Pedro of Aragón died, a victim of the plague, while he was in command of the Aragonese army that laid siege to the city of Mayorga, with Prince Juan, where he lost one of his defenders. Due to the death that spread among the besiegers of Mayorga, their commanders were forced to lift the siege. While Prince Juan of Castilla of the Tarifa and Juan Núñez of Lara waited for the arrival of the King of Portugal with his troops to join them at the site where they planned to subdue the city of Valladolid, where they found the Queen María of Molina and Fernando IV, the Aragonese king attacked Murcia and Soria, and King Dionisio of Portugal attacked along the line of the Duero River, while Diego López V of Haro spread disorder in his Vizcaya domain.

== Children ==
- Isabella of Castile (1283–1328). Married first James II of Aragon and secondly John III, Duke of Brittany.
- Ferdinand IV of Castile (1285–1312).
- Alfonso de Castilla (1286–1291)
- Henry (1288–1299)
- Peter of Castile, Lord of Cameros. Married Maria of Aragon, daughter of James II of Aragon.
- Philip (1292–1327). Married his cousin Margarita de la Cerda, daughter of Alfonso de la Cerda.
- Beatrice of Castile (1293-1359).

== Commemoration ==
The Spanish Navy screw corvette Doña María de Molina, which was in commission from 1869 to 1886, was named for María de Molina.

Royal titles
Preceded by Violant of Aragon	Queen consort of Castile and León; 1284–1295	Vacant Title next held by Constance of Portugal
Preceded by Blanca Alfonso of Molina	Lady of Molina; 1293–1321	Succeeded by Alfonso XI of Castile
