= Álvaro Pérez de Castro =

Castilian nobleman

Álvaro Pérez de Castro "the Castilian" (died at Orgaz in 1240) was a Castilian nobleman.

== Biography ==
He was the son of Pedro Fernández de Castro and Jimena Gomez, daughter of Gómez González de Manzanedo.

He served as Mayordomo mayor and lieutenant of King Alfonso IX of León on several occasions.
In 1225 Álvaro Pérez de Castro, now in the service of the Muslim rules of Jaén, participated with 160 Christian knights in the successful defence of Jaén against an army under Ferdinand III of Castile. After the siege, Álvaro Pérez de Castro negotiated a truce between Castile and Granada, sealed with the release of 1,300 Christian prisoners. This gained him the favour of Ferdinand of Castile.

From then on he served Ferdinand of Castile, who entrusted him with the possession of the strengths of Andújar and Martos and subsequently appointed him King's representative in the border fortresses of Andalusia and in the city of Cordoba, which he helped to conquer in 1236. He also commanded the Christian forces which defeated the Muslims at the Battle of Jerez, fought in 1231.

== Marriages ==
He married for the first time in 1212 with Aurembiaix, future Countess of Urgel and the daughter of Count Ermengol VIII of Urgell, but the marriage was annulled in 1228.

He married a second time with Mencía López de Haro, future queen of Portugal, daughter of Lope Díaz II de Haro, Lord of Vizcaya, and his wife Urraca Alfonso de León, daughter of Alfonso IX of León.

He died without leaving any offspring of his two marriages and was buried in the Monastery of Santa María de Valbuena, in which his father had been buried.
