= Matías Moreno =

Spanish painter

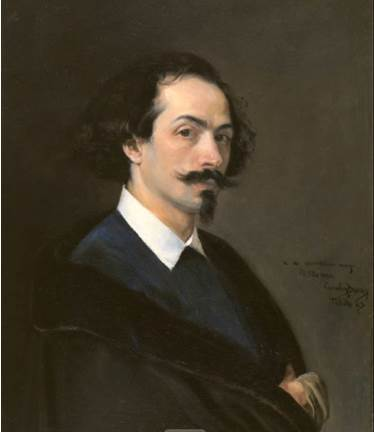
Matías Moreno; portrait by Carolus-Duran (1867)

Matías Moreno González (7 March 1840 – 8 July 1906) was a Spanish painter, sculptor, art restorer and copyist; primarily of works by El Greco.

== Biography ==
Moreno was born in Fuente el Saz de Jarama. His father was a doctor. He began his studies in Barcelona at the Reial Acadèmia Catalana de Belles Arts de Sant Jordi from 1854 to 1856, then transferred to the Real Academia de Bellas Artes de San Fernando. His instructors there included Carlos Luis de Ribera and Federico de Madrazo. He completed his artistic education by copying the Italian and Dutch masters at the Museo del Prado, but he was especially influenced by Diego Velázquez.

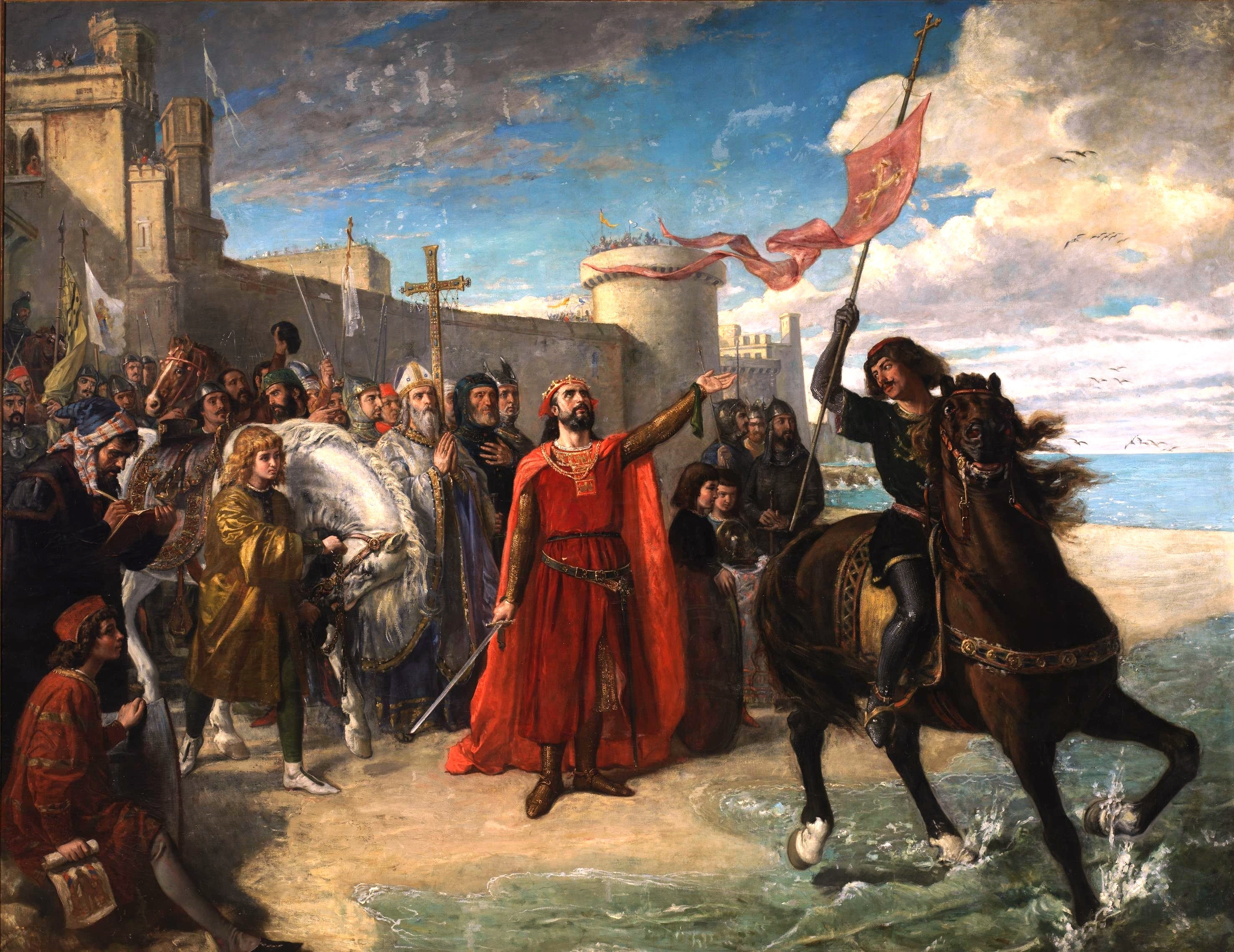
Alfonso el Sabio Taking Cádiz

His first major showing was at the National Exhibition of Fine Arts in 1864, where he won a third-class medal for his "Portrait of Miss J.M." (probably his fiancée, Josefa, who he would marry in 1870). In 1866, he became a Professor at the Instituto del Toledo and won another medal at the Exhibition for his depiction of Alfonso el Sabio claiming the sea after taking Cádiz.

In 1870, he was named a corresponding member of the San Fernando Academy and was appointed to a place on the provincial Monuments Commission. That same year, he presented several works at the Paris Salon and, after 1872, would spend his summers there.

After 1873, with his marriage going poorly for unknown reasons, he immersed himself entirely in his work and the education of his daughter Maria, who later became an aspiring painter.

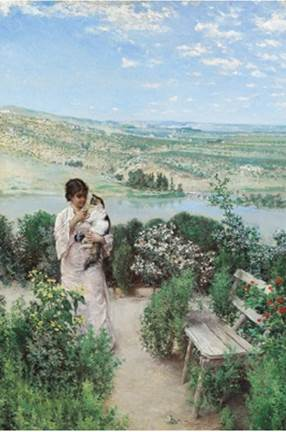
Flower Garden with View, Near Toledo

Around that same time, he also participated in the restoration of several works by El Greco that the Museo del Prado had recently acquired, including The Burial of the Count of Orgaz. It was said that he worked on the restoration project to the point of exhaustion. In 1895, Maria died at the age of twenty-two and he rarely painted after that.

In 1902, now a widower, he remarried and began focusing his attention on his new daughter-in-law, Maria Luisa, who would become a professor of ceramics. At that time he began devoting himself to sculpture and became head of the College of Industrial Arts; a position he held until his death. In 1905, he was elected to the city council of Toledo on the Liberal Party ticket. His death, in Toledo, was the result of an illness caused by the stress from a financial scandal at the college, although he was cleared of any wrongdoing.
