= Palacio de Fabio Nelli =

Coordinates: 41.6561°N 4.7289°W

The Palacio de Fabio Nelli is, according to the critics and historians, the Renaissance building of the most important classical period of the city of Valladolid (Castile and León, Spain). According to the architect Antonio Bustamante García, "it's considered this palace the best exponent and work of first row inside the Classicism of the civil architecture of Valladolid". The art critics ensure that had much to do with the result of the work, the good relations and understanding between the sponsor, the banker Fabio Nelli, and the genius and mastery of the author Pedro of Mazuecos El Mozo.

Built in a period in which Valladolid became more decadent, its construction lasted some twenty years, succeeding periods of inactivity in the work and a change of architect due to the death of Juan de la Lastra, the original architect.

Decorated and finished following Italian classicist style, its facade, playground and stairs are the epitome of this type of architecture in Valladolid. After the death of the banker the Palacio had several uses, until in the 20th century it became headquarters of the Valladolid Museum, an institution destined to collect all the archaeological and artistic remains of the province.

The structure is in relatively good condition, awaiting an expansion of the space dedicated to the museum and a restoration of the frontage and the playground of the old palace.

== Historical context ==
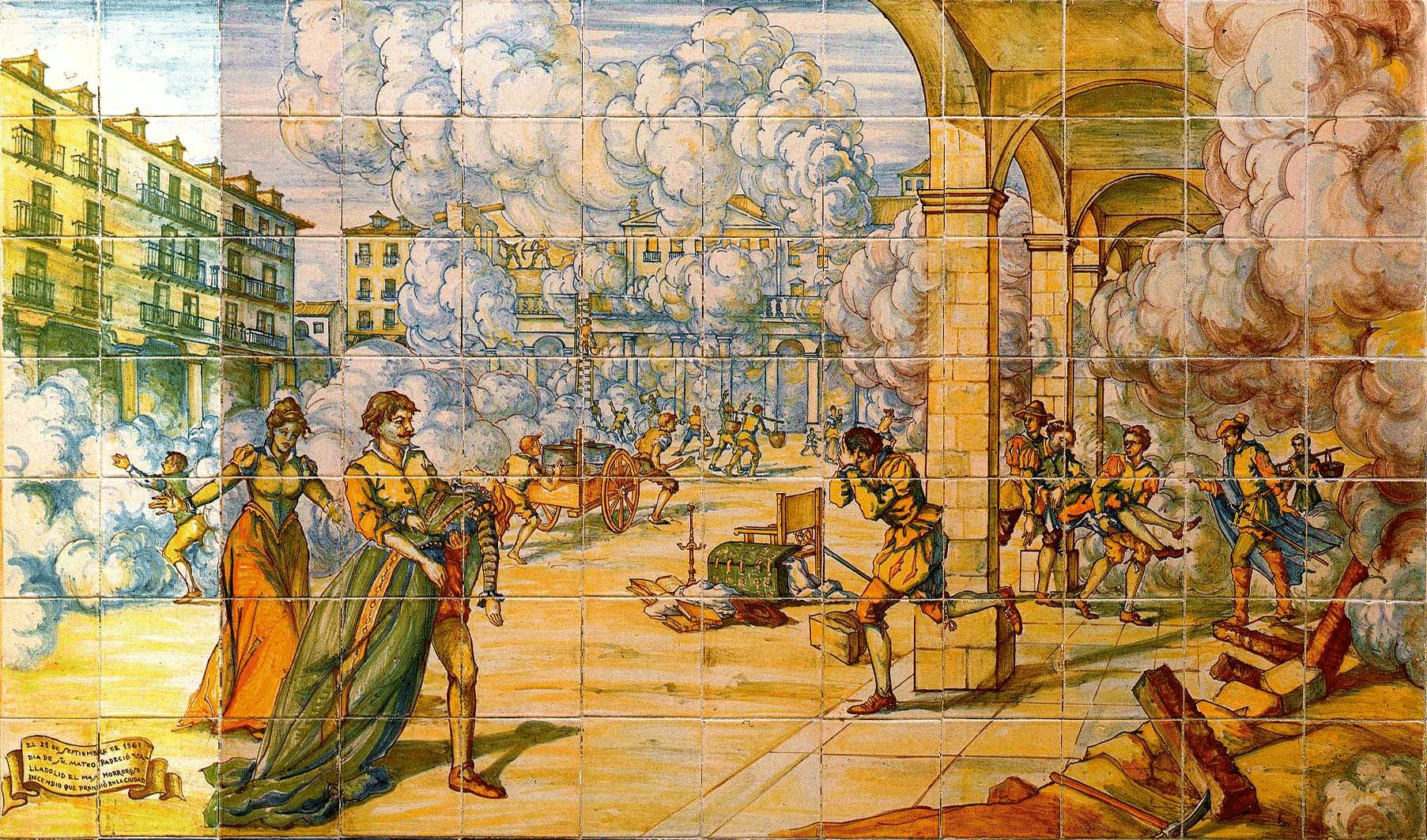
The fire of Valladolid, one of the most important events of the period.

Valladolid in the mid-16th century and beginnings of the 17th was a city that knew its own splendour, and began a decadent stage that would last centuries. Fabio was born in 1533, but the city had stagnated since the defeat of the comuneros. Six years earlier, in 1527, Valladolid witnessed one of the most important events of its history: the birth of the future king Felipe II in the Palace of Pimentel. That same year, work began on the new colegiata, which, after several alterations at the project and delays, obtained the rank of cathedral, although it was never finished . In 1561 a fire destroyed a large part of the city, after which Felipe II promised to reconstruct the destroyed areas, giving the city the first regular Greater Square of Spain. The king's decision to settle the Court in Madrid supposed a serious problem for the city (the same occurred with Toledo), which initiated the decadent way in which it remained until well into the 19th century. It received a breath of cool air with the granting of the title of city and with the arrival of the Court in 1601, but five years later, Felipe III returned again to Madrid and Valladolid was plunged in lethargy.

== Fabio Nelli ==
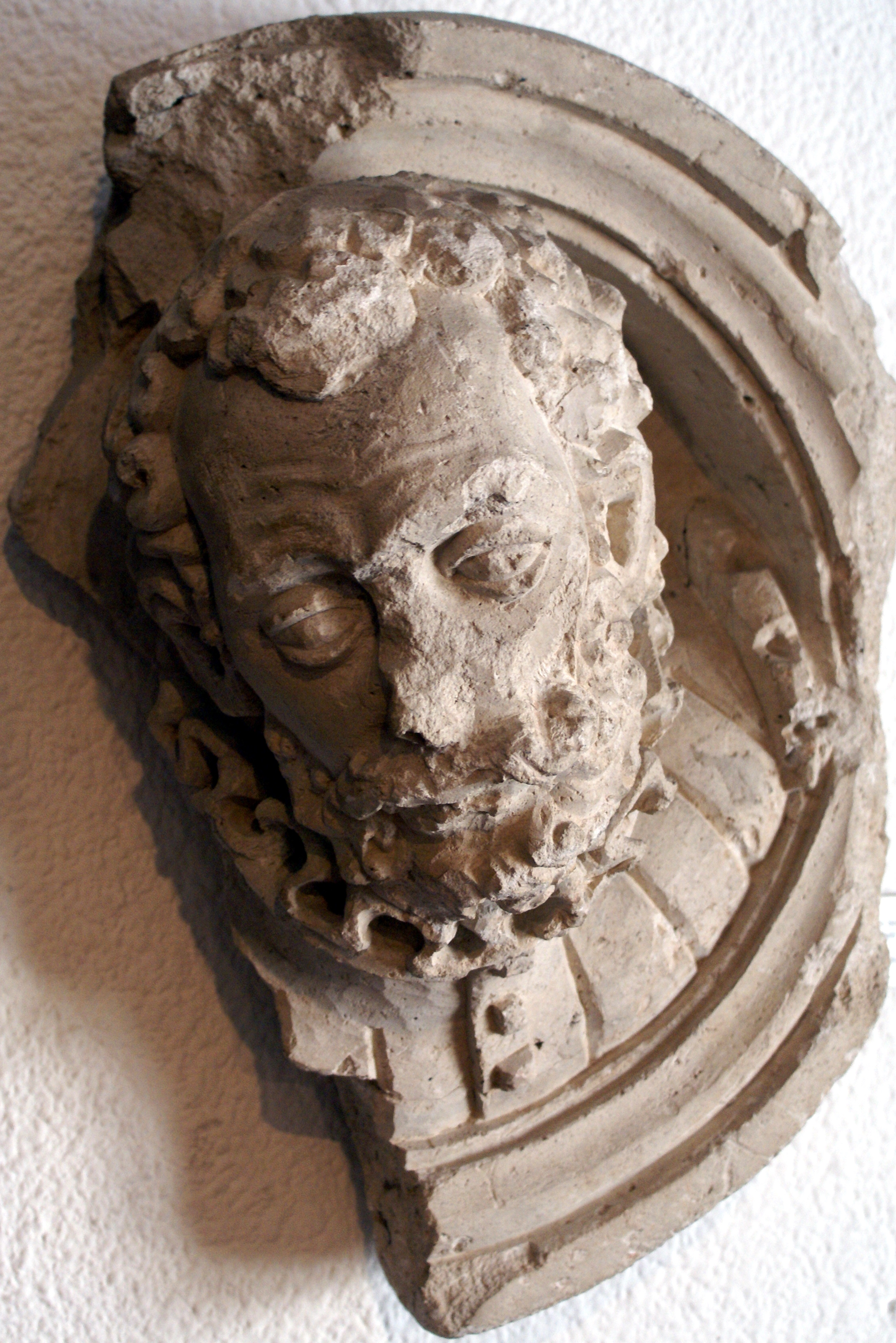
Bust of Fabio Nelli.

Fabio Nelli was an important Valladolid banker born in 1533. His father, Alfonso Nelli, died broke in Tábara (Zamora), having belonged to a banking family of Siena (Italy). His mother was Damiana de Espinosa. After his father died, Fabio Nelli left Seville in the company of his uncles Pedro and María de Espinosa. There he spent his professional life.

He married at maturity with Mrs. Violante Rivadeneira (who died in 1591). They had two daughters: Damiana, who married his cousin Hernando de Rivadeneira and Leonor, who married Cristóbal de Benavente y Benavides and which later became earl of Fontenar.

Damiana had a son called Alonso Nelli (1601-1662) who married Catalina de Zúñiga. They had a son called Baltasar Francisco de Rivadeneira y Zúñiga, whom Felipe IV awarded the title of marquis of la Vega de Boecillo in 1663. It is the origin of the shield seen on the front of the Fabio Nelli palace and which is preserved on the grounds of Boecillo.

Fabio Nelli constituted mayorazgo in 1595 and ratified it in 1608 with anything new. He did it in favour of his greater daughter Damiana and of his descendants. After Damiana's death in 1614, the mayorazgo passed to his son Alonso Nelli.

== The return to Valladolid ==
The economic prosperity of the city -consequence of this close relation with the Crown-, that since the 12th century had conceded the first fairs, attracted to the city wealthy families of merchants and bankers.

Fabio Nelli de Espinosa, son of the banker sienés Alfonso Nelli, was born in Valladolid, but the family businesses at a time of booming trade with America brought him outside his hometown until 1576, date of his definitive return and in which he ordered the construction of his residence.

On several houses purchased to the Earl of Osorno, the architect Juan de la Lastra posed a Spanish residence. But since 1595 the architect Pedro de Mazuecos introduced elements of Italian inspiration: symmetrical frontage with two towers and access in the center, on line with the entrance to the playground. This has columns in three of his sides, while the four is closed with a wall, when orienting to the north, and be so cold.

== Palace construction ==
The works of the palace initiated in 1576 in the solar of the main houses already quoted. April 15 of the same year the banker Fabio Nelli and the teacher of stonework Juan de la Lastra signed an agreement to carry out the foundations of the walls of the building. In this document were perfectly determined measures, materials and how to work them:

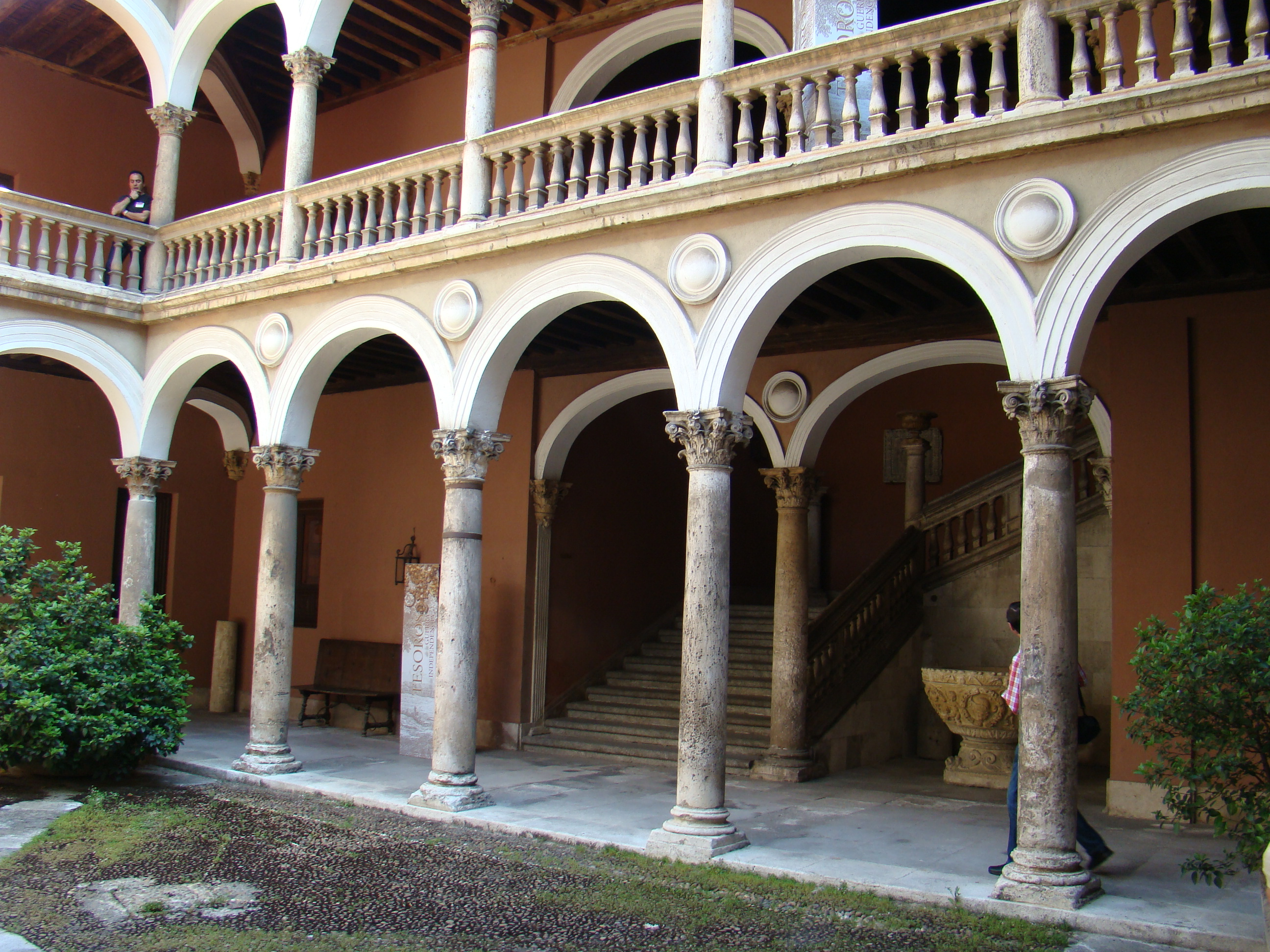
Playground built under the direction of Pedro de Mazuecos el Mozo and the execution of the sculptor Francisco de la Maza.

Juan de la Lastra built the foundations and the corresponding areas. The plan was the usual one for Valladolid palaces: a hallway on the left side of the frontage, with the doors of the street and of the playground misaligned forming an oblique line without taking into account an axis of symmetry. He placed the access door to the playground from the hallway in steep form to avoid all vision from the external door.

Juan de la Lastra took as a model to carve the door of the hallway which led to the playground, the architect Baldassare Peruzzien and his work of restoration of the Maximum Colonne palace, both in form and location. (Note: Miembro de una de las principales familias de banqueros de Florencia durante el siglo XIV) (Note: Juan de la Lastra nunca vio la obra de Peruzzi pero sin duda la conocía a través de los textos de Iacomo Vignola.) The works continued during the following six years according to the traces of the palace in Valladolid tradition, with the typical offset hallway, as was made in the Berruguete's house, Escudero-Herrera palace, Pimentel palace and in so many others. But the work of Juan de la Lastra was truncated by the illness and death of the artist who, in January 1582 gave testament shortly before his death.

From that year the sculptor Francisco de la Maza and the architect Pedro de Mazuecos el Mozo were commissioned to continue the construction of the building. It has news of the respective agreements thanks to the document of the Process of Hierarchical Analysis. appearing with the signature of the notary Miguel Palacios, (year of 1582, leg. 531, fol. 100). In these documents are all sorts of instructions and details for style of columns and stairs of the main playground, from traces of Pedro de Mazuecos el Mozo. That year began the works of playground and stairs, which lasted four months as is demanded in the agreement.

In 1589 Fabio Nelli decided to personally deal with the management of the works of his palace (until the moment his brother had addressed) staying in the rear section which was the only ones finished even with decoration. The first step was the completion of the frontage and cover which turned to the young and promising Diego de Praves accepted, counting as guarantors with Juan de Nates and Juan de Mazarredonda and witness Pedro de Arce. (Note: Diego de Praves trabajaba desde 1582 en las obras de la cuarta colegiata de Valladolid, bajo la influencia de Juan de Herrera.) In the agreement referred to at the time which should provide the works and the established price:

In the month of December still were working in the bay of the front, so the occupants of the palace had big difficulties to go out; Fabio Nelli asked permission to his neighbour, the bricklayer Domingo de Azcutia to be able to use an alley of his property that had access to the Bridge street (current Expósitos). (Note: Domingo de Azcutia, alarife y carpintero, tenía en efecto unas casas de su propiedad colindantes con las de Fabio Nelli por la parte de la calle de la Puente (Expósitos).)

Works was stopped for five years. The historians do not have very clear ideas about the cause, although it may have been the economic crisis that began in the last decade of the century, compared to previous years (80's decade) when everything had been prosperity and abundance. After those five years, Fabio Nelli commissioned works of the forward and cover to Pedro de Mazuecos El Mozo, giving all his trust. Between the beginnings of the works of the palace in 1576 and the new agreement, had released new ideas in the world of the architecture in Italy. (Note: Mazuecos es el introductor de los principios clasicistas cuyo debate había comenzado ya con Juan de la Lastra incorporando éste elementos de tradición medieval.) Solutions that gave Mazuecos for the location of the hallway and size and position of the playground and for the construction of the cover were inspired by the Treaty of Sebastián Serlio, Of the Antiquity, Third Book. Pedro de Mazuecos was one of the most influential architects inside the Valldadolid classicistic focus.

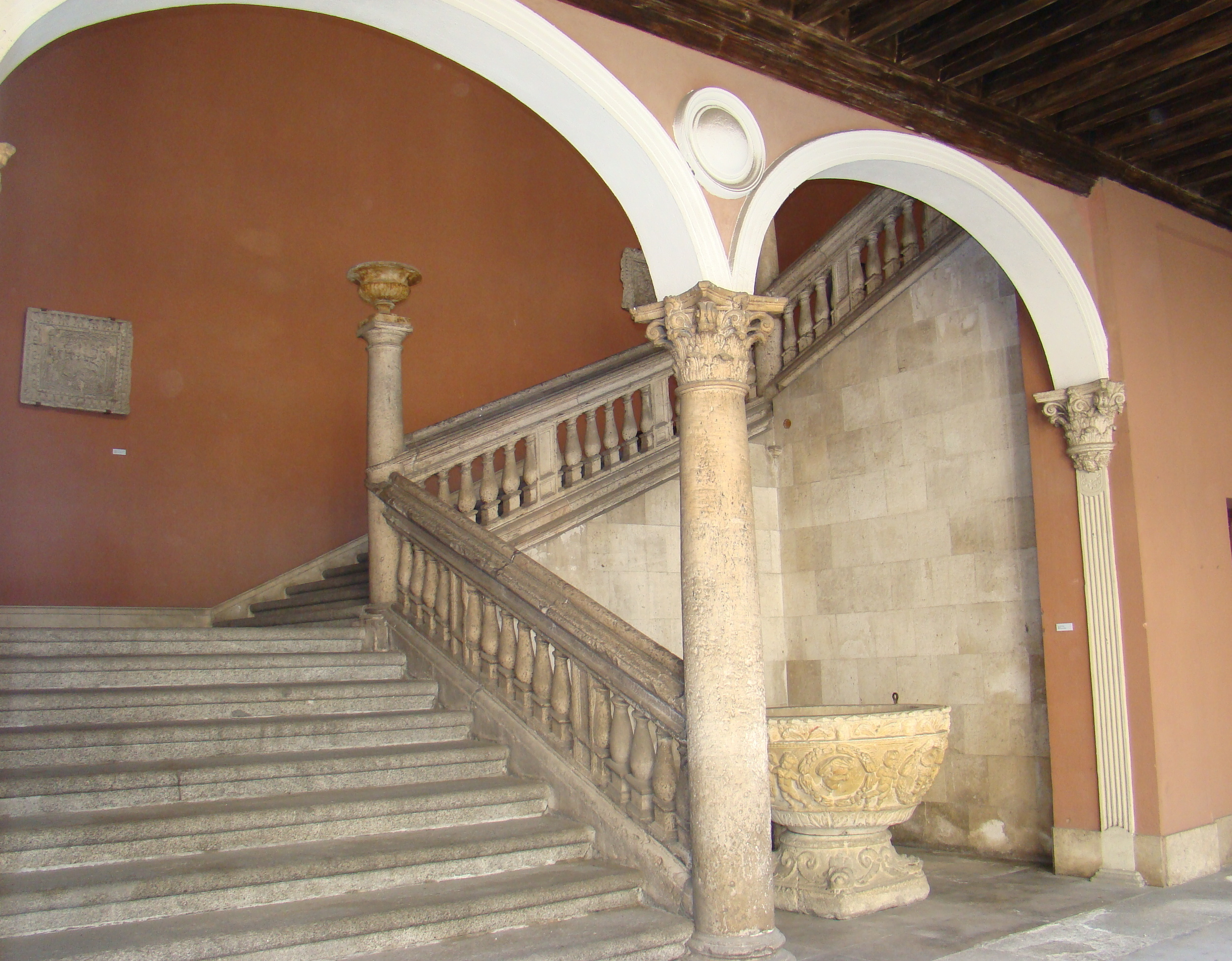
Palatial stairs from the traces of Pedro de Mazuecos El Mozo.

The new trace based on the principles of symmetry and centrality offered by Renaissance, following at the same time theories and Sebastián Serlio tips.

In the case of the Fabio Nelli Palace it was not to restore a Gothic building but to conclude a frontage and cover in a building whose interior did not exactly meet the new fashions. According to the taste of Fabio Nelli, the palace had to finish following the latest Italian fashion and for that purpose fully relied on Pedro de Mazuecos.

Pedro of Mazuecos moved the door of entrance to the playground from the left corner where it was to the center of the bay, thus leaving the new centering hallway. The entrance from the street was also adjusted, placing it in the middle of the frontage. From this disposal centred and confronted Mazuecos designed and distributed the rest of the building, giving to the palace the classicistic principles which so far had not experienced in the palatial architecture of the Northern plateau: symmetry, frontality and centrality.

== Description of the frontages ==
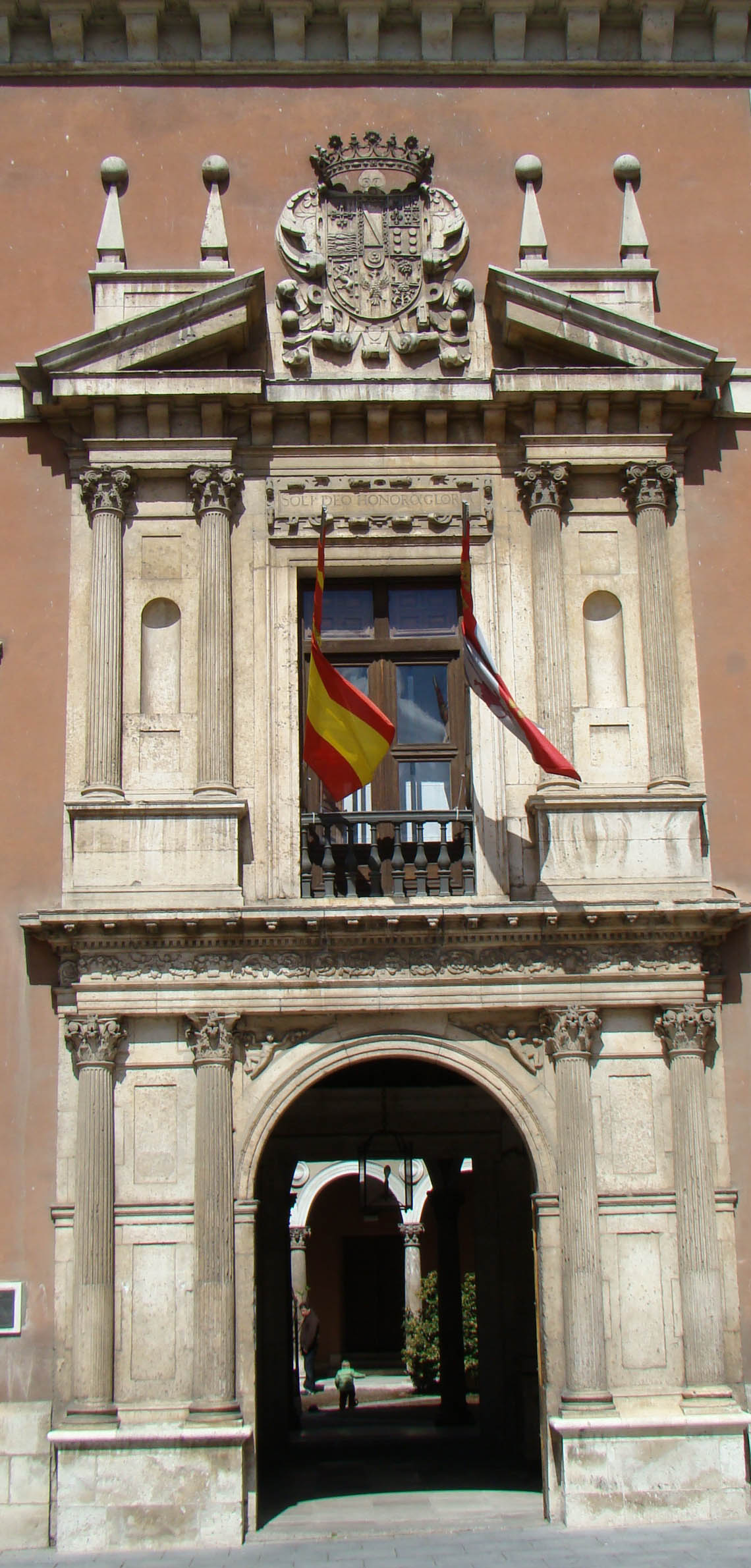
Main frontage with the aligned and centred door that lets see at the end the access to the playground.

The frontage composes of the central body and two lateral towers, advanced compared to the rest. It is made in stone for the zócalo and brick for the walls, appearing all plaster except the cover.

The door is semicircular, with double grooved columns to the sides, and looks over a frieze decorated with cherubs and vegetable figures.

The second body has on average a balcony, with bronze handrail. On the lintel sees the lemma Soli deo honour and glory. On the sides there are also double columns, between which niches and boxes are arranged in inserted, so following fashionable geometrical aesthetics in the period in which it built. The pediment is broken, and in the gap is the shield. It is finished with pyramids and balls to the Escorial taste. The cornice has a flying with modillions with molding of heel.

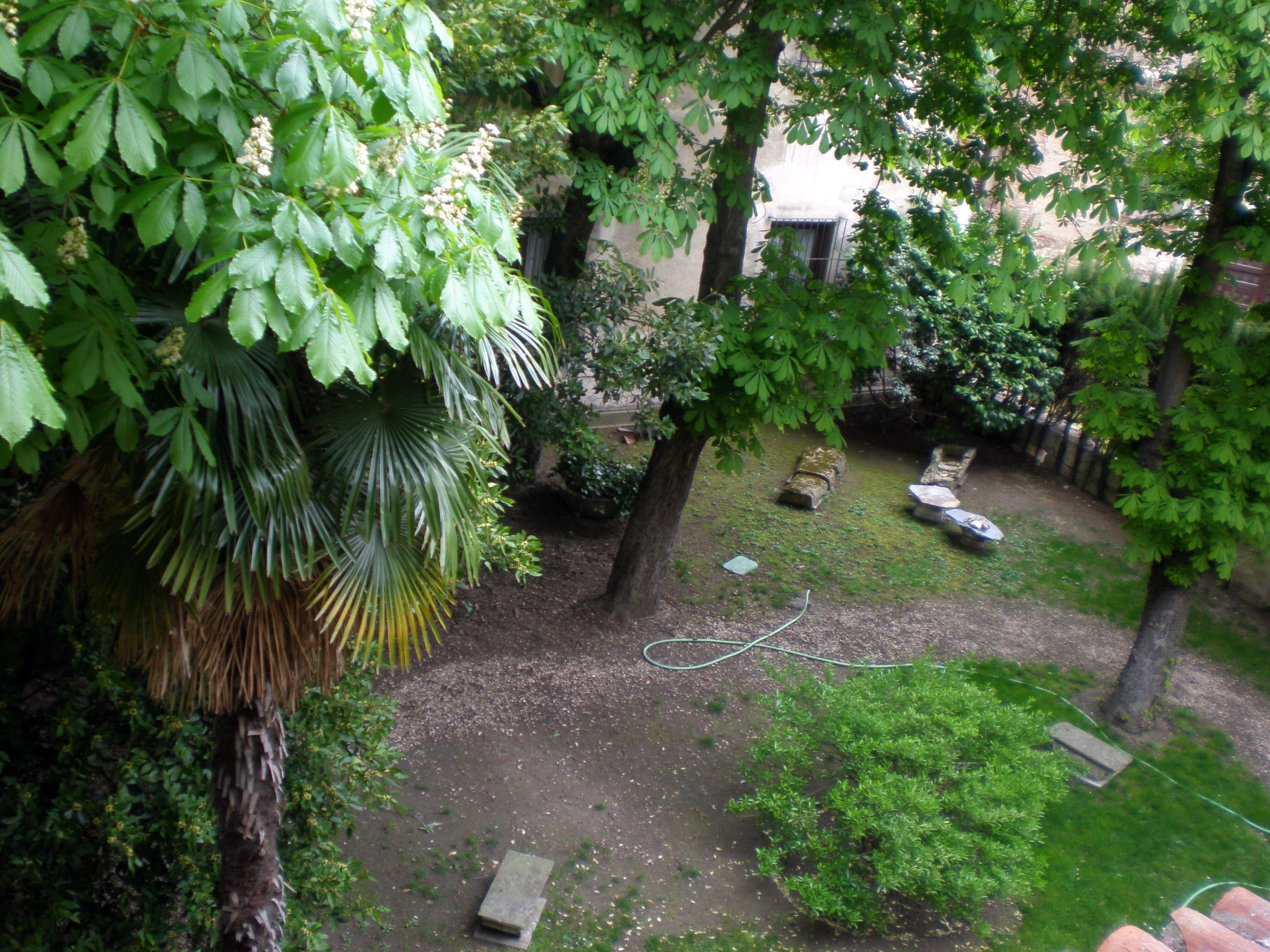
Vergel

The lateral frontage that is in visible today gives to the ancient street of the Bridge, today Expósitos. It finishes a gallery of arches with ornaments of mascarones, of the Italian taste. The other lateral frontage cannot be seen because it is hidden by other buildings. Part of this frontage gives to the garden of the palace called the vergel.

The door of entrance is centred and drives to the hallway that presents his door of entrance to the playground faced with street and also centred in the bay.

=== Ornamentation and symbolism ===
Between hojarascas one can see a nude character that carries a pendant of grapes that offers to an animal in fierce attitude. It is Baco, soothing the wild beasts with the help of wine.

There appear sand devils or putti sustaining a medallion or shield, typically Florentine, of unclear significance. This ornament was widely used and spread in reliefs of the Spanish Renaissance.

It has full baskets of fruits, coinciding on the capitals of the four columns; it is a representation of abundance, often used in the Valladolid palaces in the 16th century.

In the centre of the frieze, separating the symmetrical grotesques already described, is a face with sarcastic and mocking expression, almost diabolical: a figurehead who can recall the Italian models of the satyrs or the representation of a terrifying. It has been interpreted as a Dionysian mask representing eyes or window or inner light when being situated just in the center of the door of entrance.

In the spandrels of the arch of entrance there is two ornamental figurines representing children or sand devils that hold some fruits. It has wanted to relate to these figures with an allegory of the love.

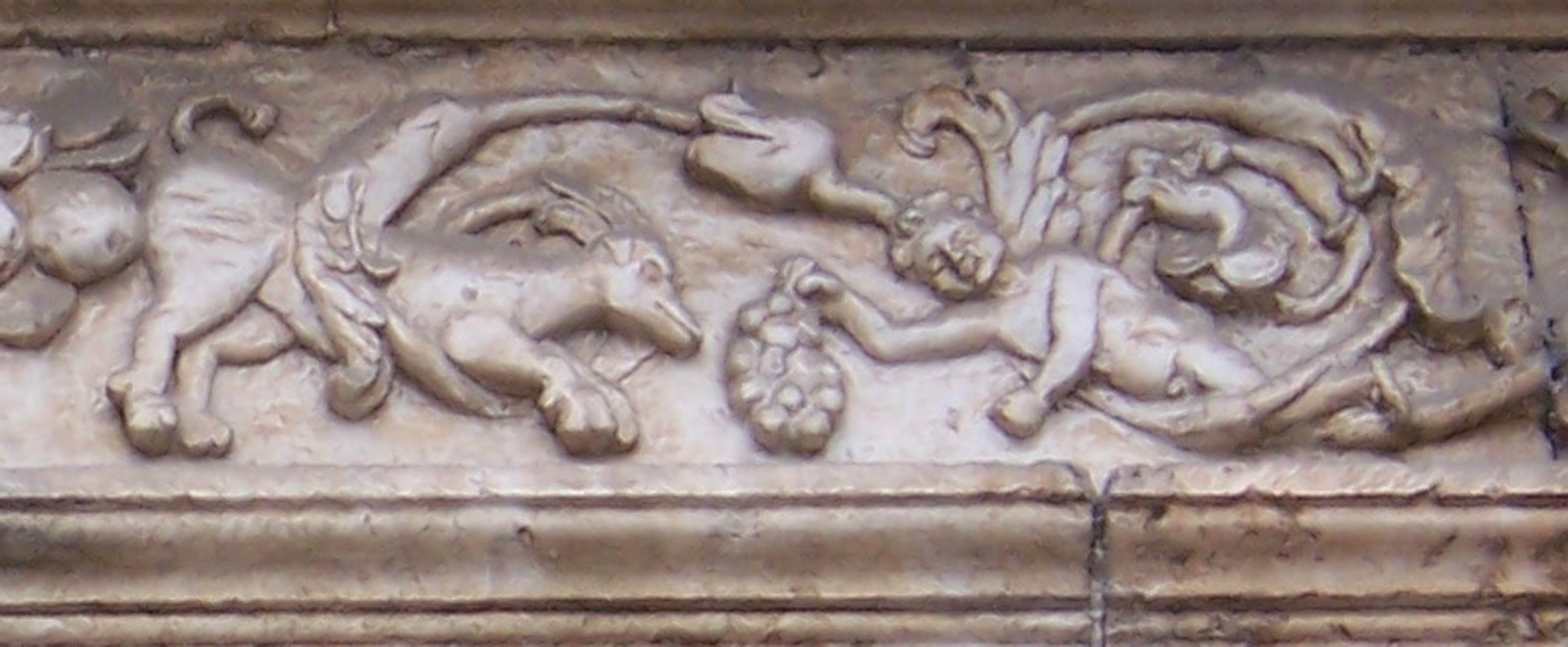
Baco Soothing the wild beasts with the help of wine.

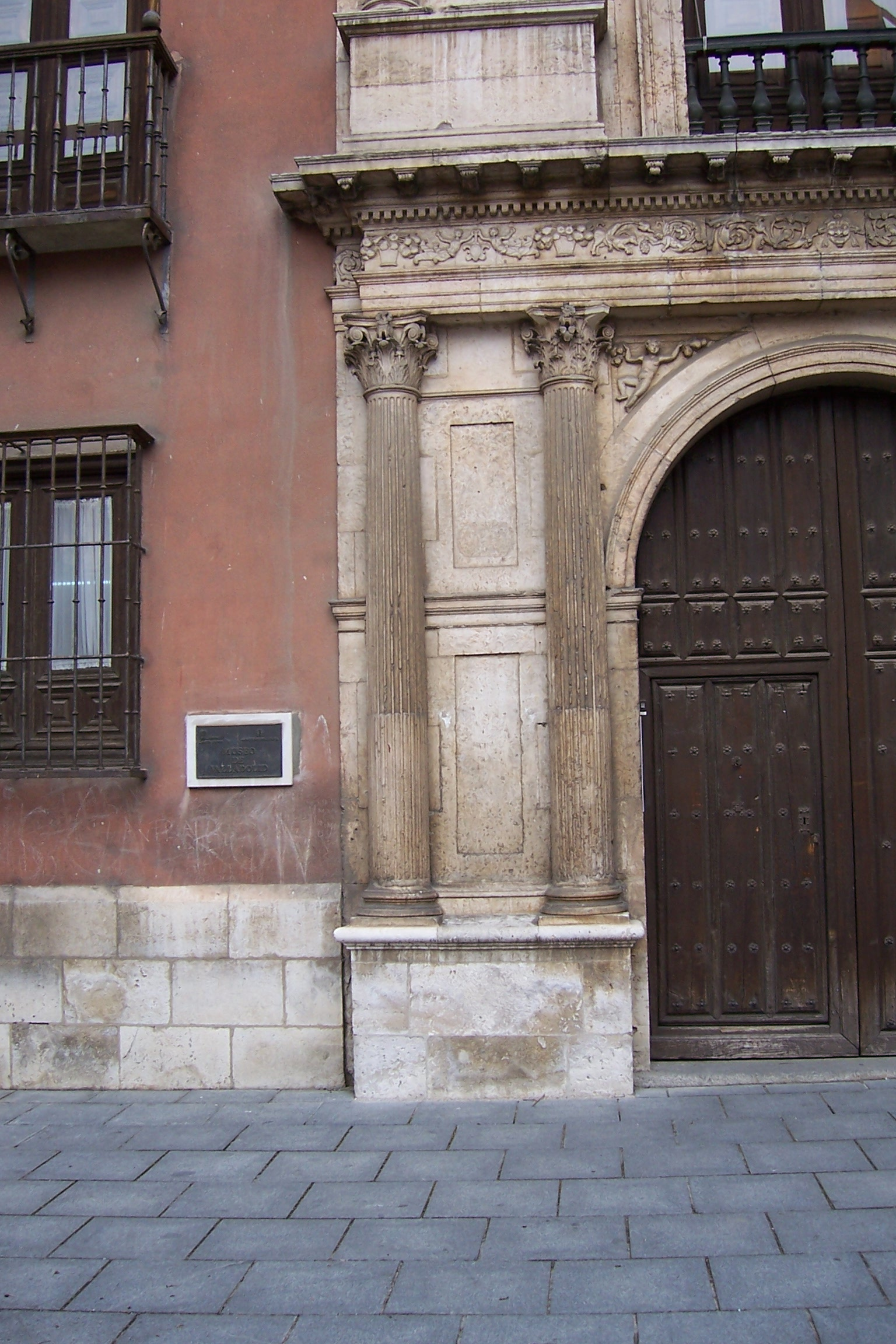
Sand devils or putti sustaining a medallion or shield and full baskets of fruits, coinciding on the capitals of the four columns.

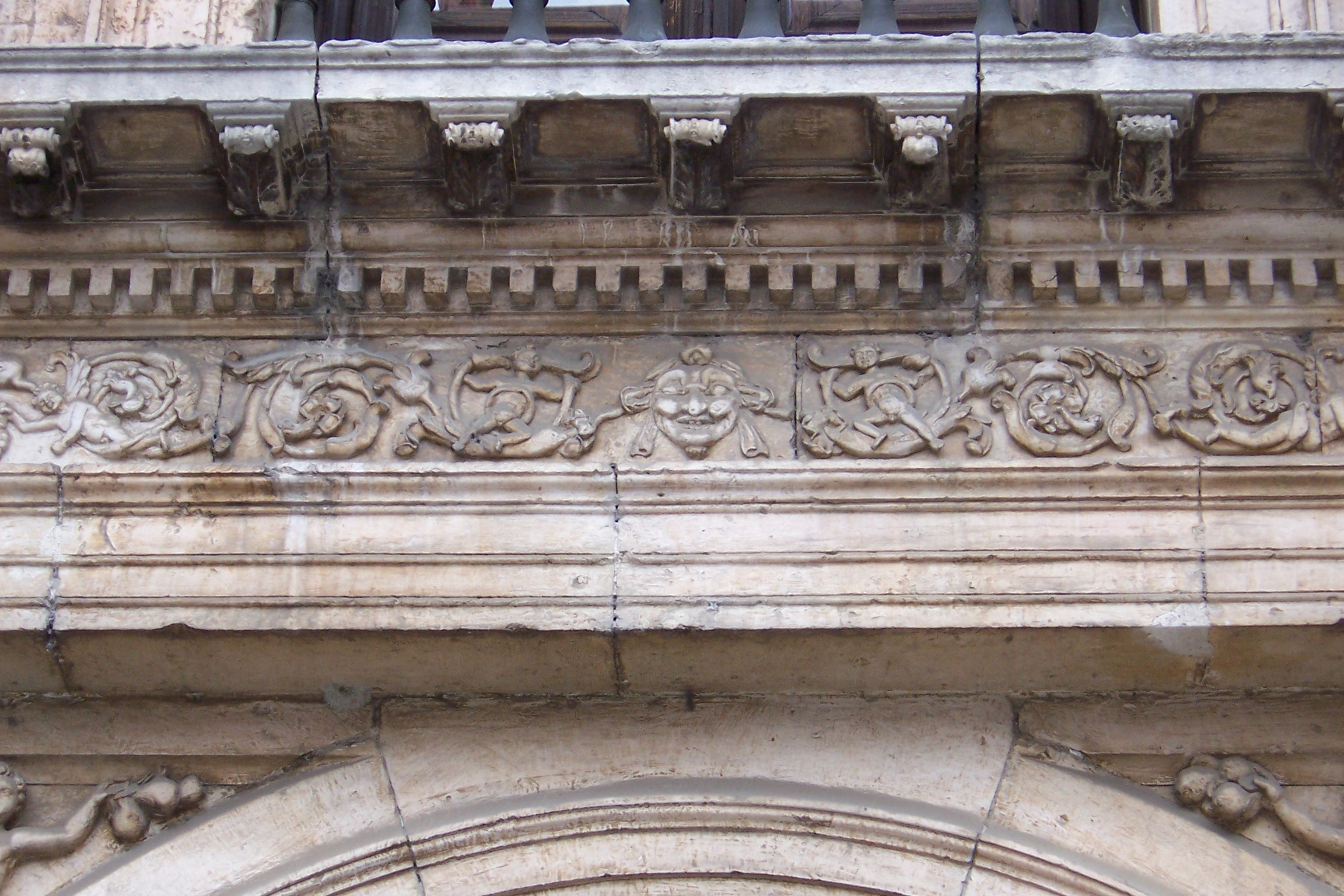
Image of a face with sarcastic and mocking expression separating the symmetrical grotesques.

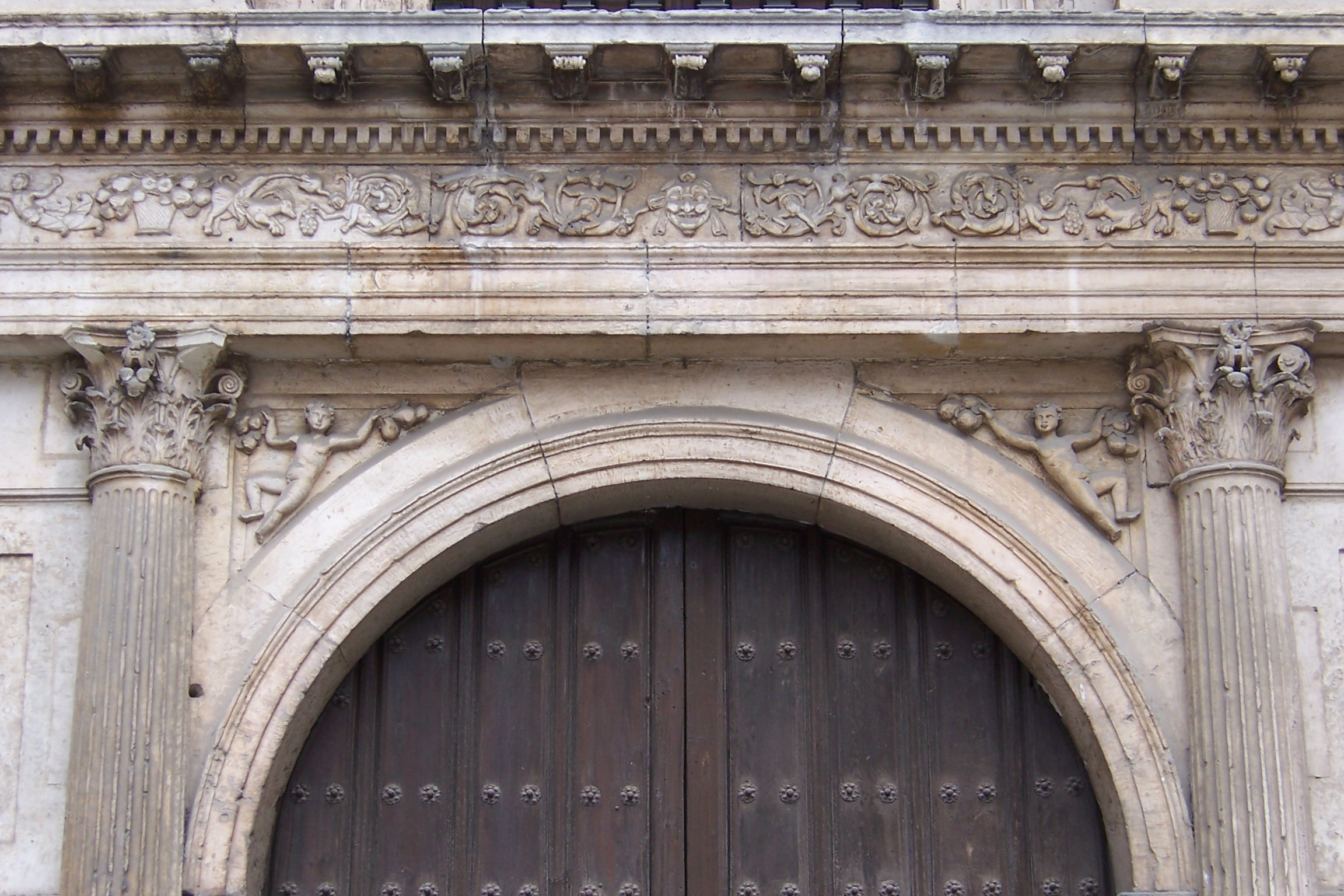
In the spandrels of the arch of entrance there are two ornamental figurines that represent some boys or sand devils that hold some fruits.

=== Legend on the frieze ===
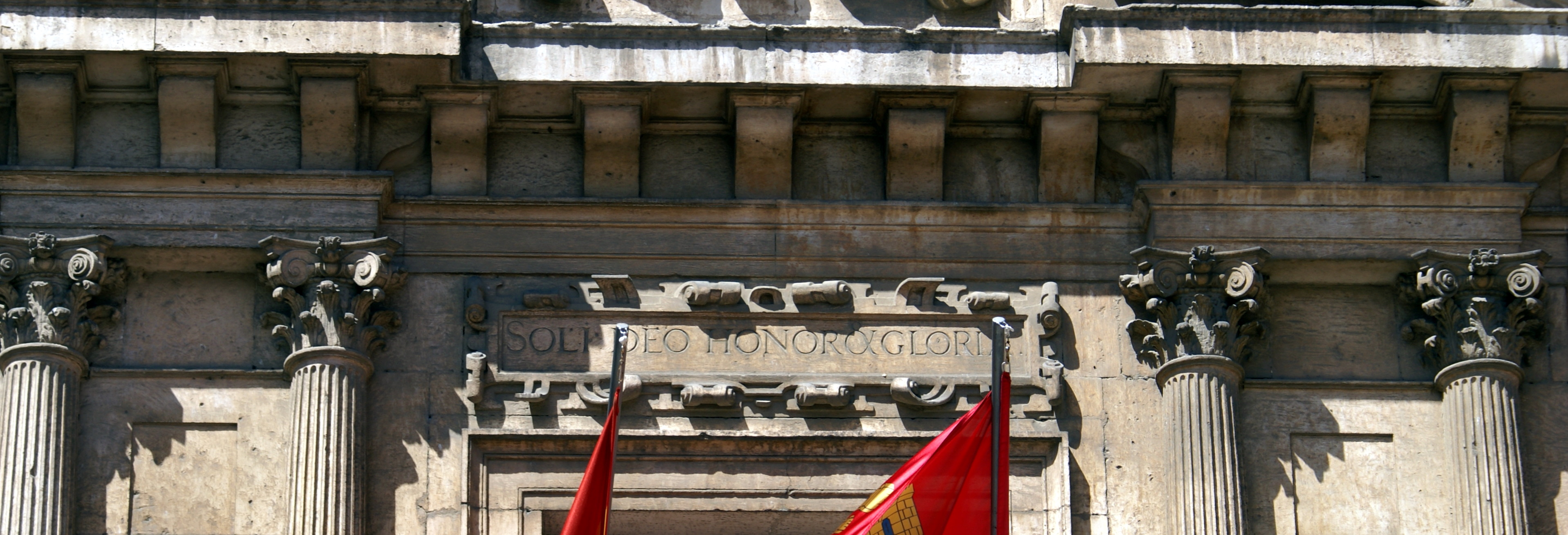
Detail of the legend on the frieze

The traditional translation of this sentence is used to be Only to God honor and glory. However it is very rare to see this maxim in a civil building not related to the Church. There has been speculation about the possibility that the sentence was headed to Felipe II in praise of related to the image that was Sun-King. In this case the translation would be: To the sun.god honour and glory. This dedication might be in gratitude for the concession made by Felipe II to Fabio Nelli awarding him generosity and nobility title.

=== Nobiliary coat of arms ===
The current coat of arms, which can see in the center of the pediment split of the palace, corresponds to the grandson of Fabio Nelli, Baltasar de Rivadeneira y Zúñiga. Also it belongs to this character the shield that still exists in the Boecillo village (current Vega de Porras), that was country house, property of the banker. (Note: Baltasar de Rivadeneira y Zúñiga, nieto de Fabio Nelli incorporó a su escudo la parte inferior del escudo de Fabio Nelli, transformando además la media águila imperial en una completa.) However, in this same site of the frontage was in his day the pertaining shield to own Fabio Nelli which have exact news thanks to the description written that made, dated on 20 June 1608.

Fabio Nelli was proud of his ancestors, that had been favoured by the emperor Carlos V, the one who gave the letter of mercy and title on 10 January 1532 and allowed can include in the familiar coat of arms the half imperial eagle.

==== Description of the current coat of arms ====
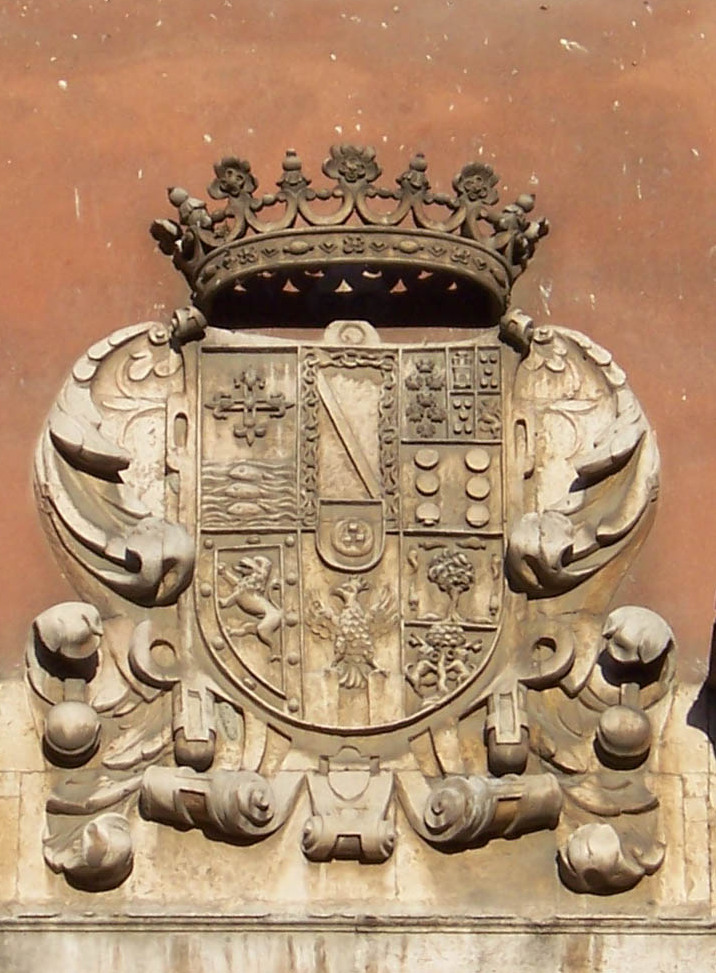
Current shield in the frontage with the arms of Baltasar de Rivadeneira y Zúñiga, grandson of Fabio Nelli.

Cut

Split of two lines and cut of one. To the right-handed: Up a floreteada cross and loaded with 5 venerate, down on waters of 3 fish in stick. It is Rivadeneira.

In the centre: A band and fringed by a chain. It is Zúñiga.

To the sinister: it Is cut. Up. Split. On the right hand, seven lilies in strip 1,2,1,2,1. It is Boy.

To the quarterly sinister cross, 1º a castle, 2º and 3º 5 anchors in saltire charged with 5 machines also in saltire, 4º a lion.

Down, 6 roundels in palo 3.3. It is Castro.

Inferior part party of two lines and cut of one. To the right-handed: León rampante, bordura de roeles or bezantes. In the centre: Eagle spread and cut. To the sinister: it Is cut. Up: A tree, border with something resembling sheaves. Down: A tree and two goats rampantes tied to the same.

Emblems: A field loaded with three roundels or bezantes out of position.

External attributes: It is stamped with a crown of marquis. On the all, a cross of the Order of Cavalry of Santiago.

== Tiles decoration ==
In the years that it was built Valladolid had very good azulejería workshops. In 1586 the workshop of Hernando de Loaisa opened and executed the decoration of the palace of Fabio Nelli at the same time that it did the school of Saint Gabriel (already missing). (Note: A Fabio Nelli le gustaba mucho este tipo de decoración y así lo demostró mandando recubrir también con azulejos la capilla de sus casas de campo de Boecillo y la capilla funeraria de la Anunciación en la iglesia de los Agustinos, de la que era su patrono y propietario.) The favourite subjects in this decoration were the mythological. Also they appeared knightly scenes in the landscape of walled cities, following to the letter the tendencies so to the fashion launched by the Italian Renaissance of Florencia. Apart from the figurative scenes appears as ornamentation repeated the image of the pomegranate, loaded of symbolism, identified with the royalty, comparing its bittersweet flavor with the glories and troubles of the Government.

== The Palace after the death of the banker ==
The banker founded a pious works in anticipation that its direct or indirect descent as it did in fact. It left written that it established in the palace a hospital and hostel of poor students, thing that never carried out. At the beginning it served as residence to some high religious charges and also leased to particular people.

In 1774 the prior and members of the convent of San Pablo were patrons of the memories and Waqf founded by Fabio Nelli as well as administrators of their goods on behalf of the Royal Audience. At that time lived as a tenant in the Palace Ramon Castaños Leguizamon, patron of the Church of our Lady of Begoña, Marqués de Vargas and resident of Valladolid. It commissioned by his account the repairs and necessary arrangements in the building, by all which protested the friars masters. Mr Castaños, in response, filed a complaint in the Royal Audience accusing these Friars of dereliction in responsibility. The Royal Audience gave the reason.

During the War of the Spanish Independence the building was occupied by the French troops, that used it as warehouse, causing a lot of flaws. In 1816 it was used to install the offices of the Real Inland revenue. After the Desamortización happened to the State and shortly after was sold to Felipe Tablares Maldonado by 114.000 real.

In the 20th century went back it to purchase the State and in 1968 was restored to house the Archaeologic museum. In the 21st century has the title of Valladolid Museum.

== The Palace in the actuality ==
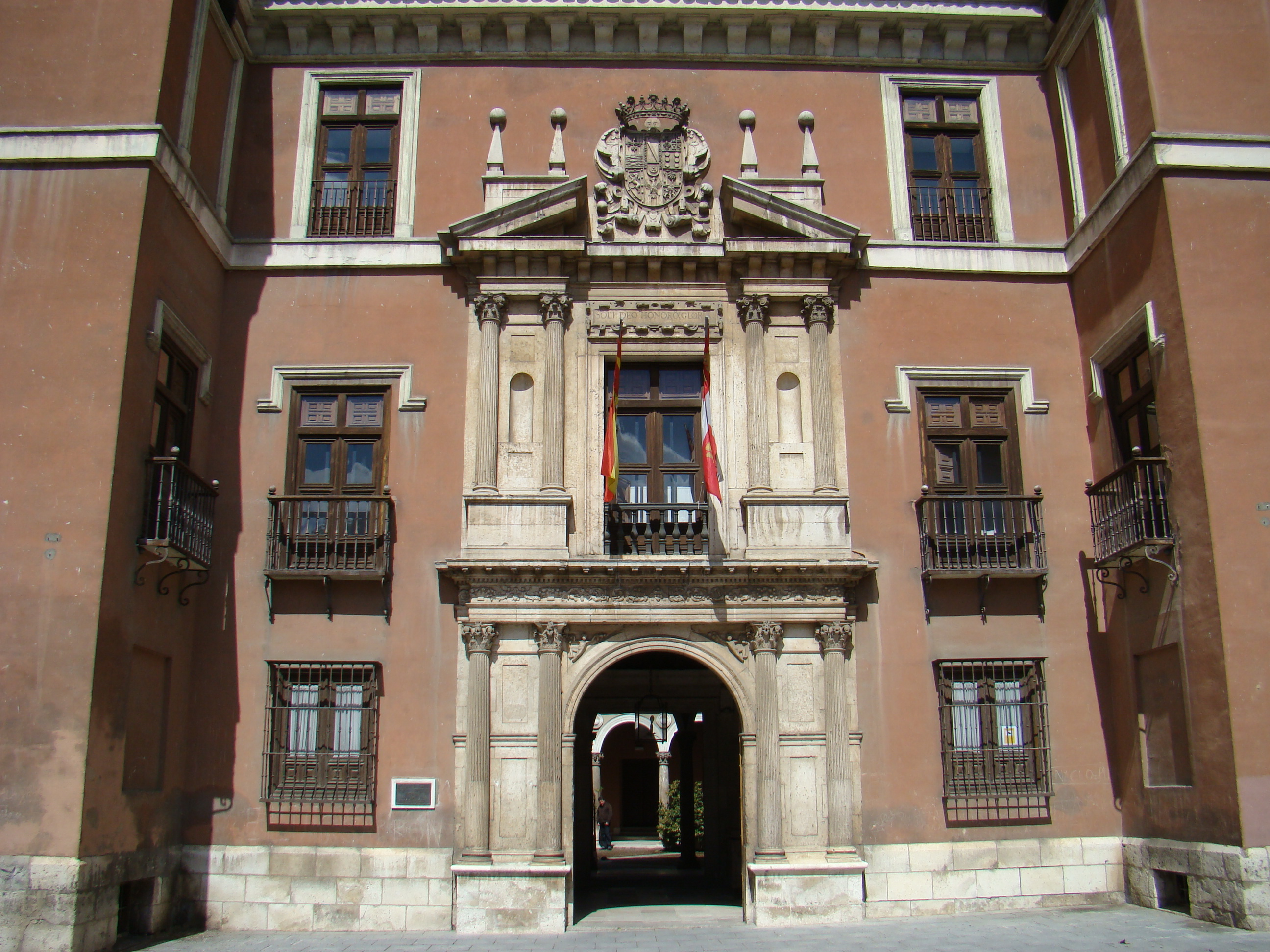
Dress of the palace in 2009.

As museum and Well of Cultural Interest is the Fabio Nelli palace from 16 November 1961, their maintenance depends in first instance of the Ministry of culture, that delegates his management in the Council of Culture of the Board of Castile and León. The Palace has not been restored tom much since the reform made in 1968, by what after more than forty years, the managers of this institution believe necessary a cleaning of the frontage and the playground.

The importance of this house inside the Spanish city and of all the autonomous community is more than remarkable. It is the epitome of a classic Valladolid palace, with its distinctly Renaissance frontage and especially its playground. This is the characteristic of the Valladolid palaces, where the part facing north is walled up, without arches that shade for shelter so characteristic in a cold city, receiving heat from the sun. There are similar palaces in the city, to the Villagómez, that also fulfil this characteristic, but the majesty of the Fabio Nelli palace is unique.

=== Perspectives and needs of future ===
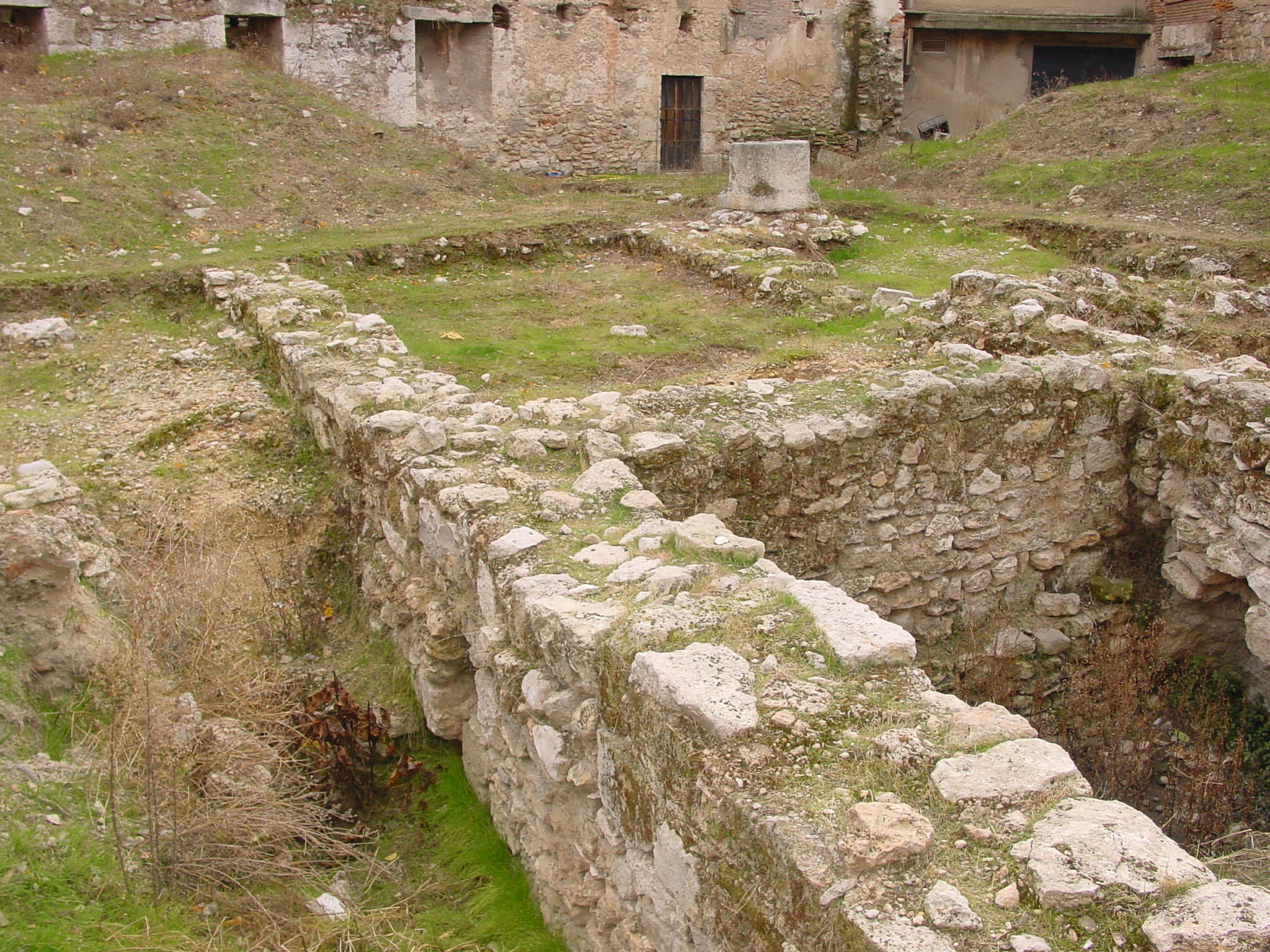
Rear part of the palace, in the street Expósitos, with rests of the Walls of Valladolid and place where plans make the enlargement of the museum.

The Valladolid museum, institution that houses the Palace, presented a project of enlargement to the City council of Valladolid in 2003, admitted to formality. In said project, pretended expand the Museum from the solar existent in the rear part of the Palace, in the Street Expósitos. When it comes from an area that belongs to the historical district of the capital, several residents of buildings adjacent to the Palace filed a complaint in court against the project, since in his view, this breached the detail study of the General Plan of Urban Ordination (PGOU). The courts failed in favour of the neighbours, by what the project finds totally paralysed and waiting for one new.

As the trial of the managers of the museum, the enlargement is absolutely necessary and of big urgency. As the archaeologic bottom that it is for all the province, the basements of the own palace find full of findings, as well as a ship situated in an industrial area. In addition to being necessary by the space that would provide to house a greater number of archaeologic findings, the project of enlargement also contemplated a thorough cleaning of the building and a repaint of the same, thus restoring its original appearance.

== The museum ==
The museum was created like Provincial Museum of Antiquities in the year 1879 and his headquarters was in the building of the School of Santa Cruz. The collection distributes in two sections: Archaeology (10 rooms) and Fine arts (8 rooms). The section of Archaeology shows a complete chronological sequence of pieces of the Valladolid province from the Paleolithic until the Half Age. In the section of Fine arts offer paintings of the 15th and 16th centuries, Flemish tapestries, goldsmithing of the 17th century, Spanish popular ceramics, sculpture and a small section devoted to the history of the city.

Between the collection of fine arts project the painting of the teacher of the Bishop Sancho de Rojas representing to the Virgin with the Boy together with two donors presented by Santa Catalina and the Adoration of the shepherds of Vicente Masip.

Between the sample of archaeologic rests stands out the sarcophagus of the child Alfonso de Castilla, with his clothes and fabrics.

== Bibliography ==
- Juan José Martín González (1983). Monumentos civiles de la ciudad de Valladolid: Catálogo monumental. Diputación de Valladolid. ISBN 84-500-8462-8.
- Jesús Urrea Fernández (1996). Arquitectura y nobleza: Casas y Palacios de Valladolid. Valladolid: Junta de Castilla y León. ISBN 84-86808-45-6.
- Daniel Villalobos Alonso (1992). El debate clasicista y el palacio de Fabio Nelli. Colegio Oficial de Arquitectos de Valladolid. ISBN 84-600-8286-5.
- María Antonia Fernández del Hoyo (2002). Casas y Palacios de Castilla y León: Valladolid. Junta de Castilla y León. ISBN 84-9718-090-9.
- Eloísa García de Wattenberg (1976). Museo Arqueológico Provincial de Valladolid. Madrid: Dirección General de Patrimonio Artístico y Cultural.
- Eloísa Wattenberg García (1994). Museo de Valladolid. Guía breve. Junta de Castilla y León.
- G. Delibes de Castro; F. Pérez Rodríguez-Aragón; E. García Wattenberg (1997). Museo de Valladolid. Colecciones. Valladolid: Junta de Castilla y León.
- F.S. Meyer (1929). Manual de Ornamentación. Barcelona: Gustavo Gili.
