= Monastery of Santa María la Real de las Huelgas, Valladolid =

Coordinates: 41°39′14″N 4°42′59″W

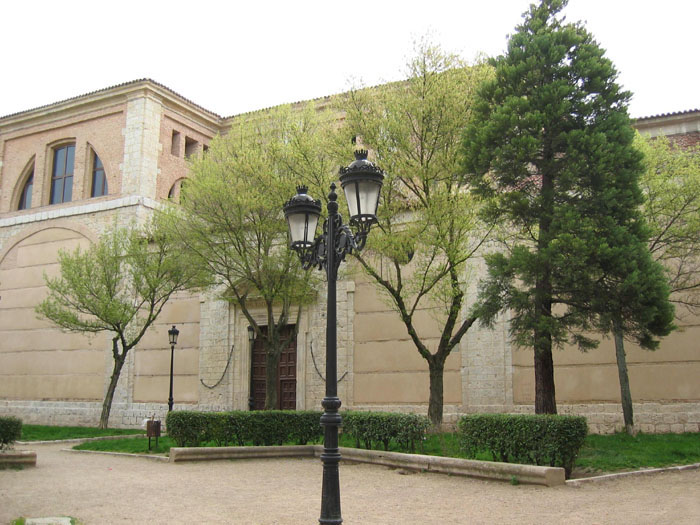
Monastery of Santa María la Real de las Huelgas

The Monastery of Santa María la Real de las Huelgas is one of the original monasteries of Cistercian nuns in Spain. It is located within the city of Valladolid in the Duero region.

== History ==
The early history of the monastery is obscure, primarily due to a fatal fire in 1282, which totally destroyed the entire monastery, along with its archives. The indicator Real (Royal) implies that it was founded by some member of the ruling family. After the fire, Queen María de Molina (1265-1321) gave the community a palace used as a place of rest—thus the title "of the Fallows" (Spanish: las Huelgas)--for their home, to which the community relocated. Of this building, only a gateway survives, Valladolid's sole example of Mudéjar art.

One later historian attributed the original foundation to doña Sancha, the sister of the Emperor of Spain Alfonso VII (1105-1157). This would be a logical history, given that it was King Alfonso, a very pious man, who introduced the Cistercians to Spain. He presumably knew the Order due to his father's Burgundian origins. He was the nephew of Pope Callixtus II and the founder of the military Order of the Knights of Calatrava, who were a part of the Cistercian Order.

This monastery lay on the new frontier of land taken back from Muslim rule in Alfonso's active engagement in the Reconquest of Christian Spain. The territory had been sufficiently pacified that he entrusted it to his sister. The new monastery suffered severe damages in 1328 from the forces of King Alfonso XI, known as "The Avenger", as he attempted to seize his grandmother and former Regent, the aforementioned Queen Maria, who had retired there after his coronation.

More peaceful times followed for that region of Spain, and the monastic community settled into a normal routine of a life of prayer and work. Over time, they acquired donations of various farms and lands in the surrounding area. They became a significant landholder in the region that way, with all the privileges pertaining to such a position. In 1482, under Abbess Isabel de Herrera y de Guzmán, the community joined the Reformed Congregation of Castile. This re-invigoration of commitment to the Rule of St. Benedict saw a revival and flowering of the monastery, which lasted into the mid-17th century.

Work on the monastery church was begun in 1579 under the rule of Abbess Ana Quijada y de Mendoza (1543-1590), and was completed in 1599. The cloister was totally renovated in 1622. A census of the monastery in 1665 shows the community to then consist of 42 nuns, with 20 servants, and two monks, who would have served as their chaplains, who had a housekeeper and 2 servants.

The monastery again suffered during the Spanish War of Independence in the 19th century, when many of their lands were appropriated by the anti-clerical government. Nevertheless it survived and recovered after that period in the national history. It was due to the loss of their lands as a source of income that a boarding school was established by the nuns in 1895. They were also able to weather the Spanish Civil War a century later, under the leadership of Abbess Purificación Martín, O.Cist., (1921-1947). After that period, the community built a new school building, which was completed in 1966.

The monastery was designated a National Monument in 1931.

Today (2011) the monastery has 17 nuns, led by the current Abbess, María del Mar Martínez Lopez, O.Cist., who was elected on 28 December 2002. They have built a modern cloister, which was inaugurated on 22 June 2007, with the support of the regional government. They have a small daughter house, the Monastery of Alconada, with 4 nuns, in the Province of Palencia. They remain a house of the Congregation of St. Bernard of Castile, part of the worldwide Cistercian Order.

== Burials ==
- María de Molina

== Sources ==
Monastery website "History" (in Spanish)
