= Ibn Hud =

Emir of Andalusia

Ibn Hud محمد بن يوسف بن هود
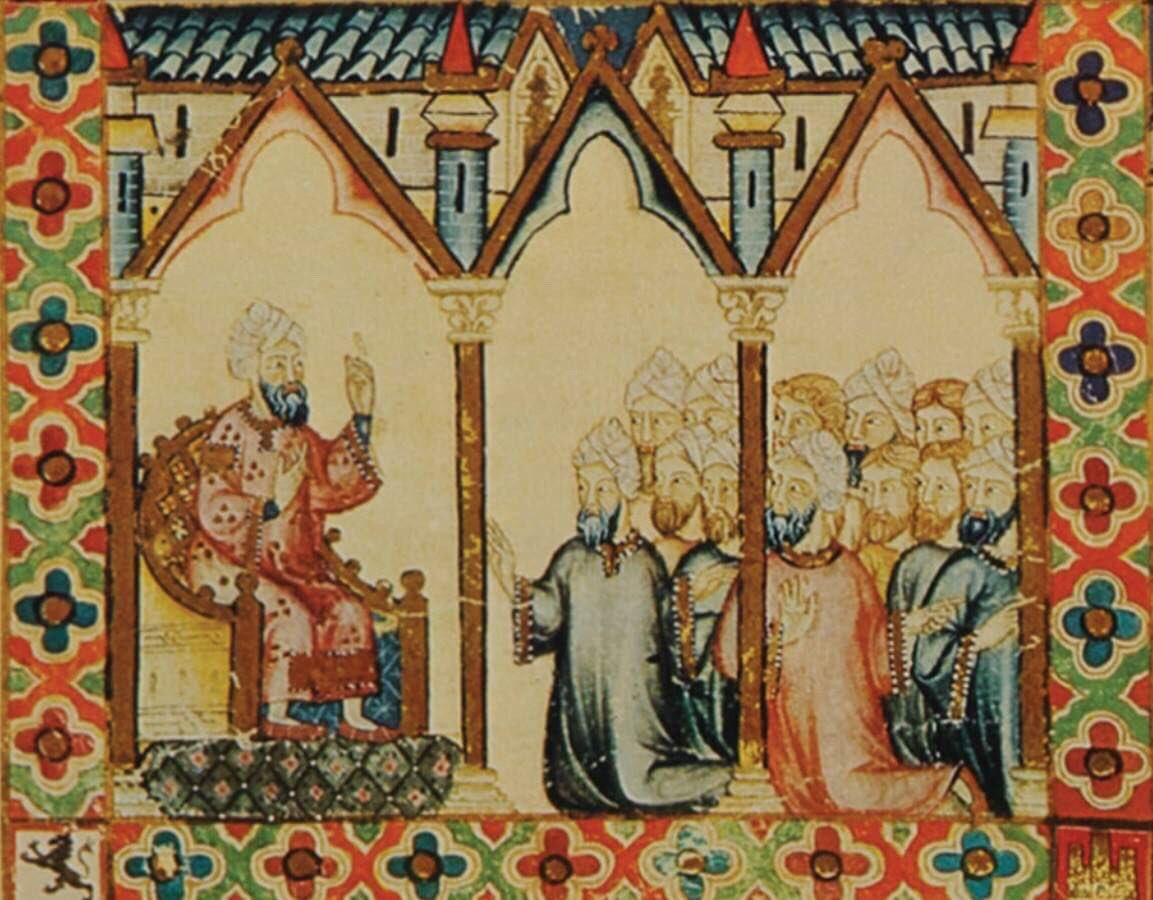
- Near-contemporary depiction of Ibn Hud receiving petitioners, from the El Escorial manuscript of the Cantigas de Santa Maria (late 13th century).
- Reign: 1228-1238
- Died: 1238; Almería
- Burial: Murcia
Names
- Abū ’Abd Allāh Muḥammad ibn Yūsuf ibn Hūd al-Judhamī
- Clan: Banu Hud
- Religion: Sunni Islam

Abū ’Abd Allāh Muḥammad ibn Yūsuf ibn Hūd al-Judhamī (Arabic: محمد بن يوسف بن هود, died 1238), commonly known as Ibn Hud, was a taifa emir who controlled much of al-Andalus from 1228 to 1238. He was a descendant of the Hudid dynasty which ruled the Taifa of Zaragoza until 1118.

After being decisively defeated by a Christian coalition at the Battle of Las Navas de Tolosa in 1212, Almohad control over al-Andalus entered terminal decline. Ibn Hud began a rebellion in May 1228, quickly winning popular support and defeating the governors of Murcia and Valencia. Meanwhile, the Almohad caliph Idris al-Ma'mun was forced to depart Seville with his remaining soldiers to defeat his nephew and rival Yahya in Marrakesh, allowing Ibn Hud to seize most of al-Andalus relatively unopposed, except Valencia, where he was opposed by Zayyan ibn Mardanish.

Seeking to legitimise his rule, Ibn Hud pledged allegiance to the Abbasid caliphs in Baghdad and took the titles of Amir al-Mu'minin and al-Mutawwakil ('he who relies [on God]'). However, in 1231 his troops were decisively defeated by the Kingdom of Castile in the Battle of Jerez, and by the Kingdom of León near Mérida. These defeats lost him support and earned him the nickname 'the Deprived'.

In 1232 Muhammad I of Granada (Ibn Nasr) elevated himself to sultan in the region of Jaén and soon became Ibn Hud's most powerful opponent, forcing him to sign a truce with Castile. Though Ibn Hud was at first able to defeat Ibn Nasr in 1234, he was not able to protect Córdoba from being taken over by Ferdinand III of Castile in 1236, and had to sign another truce with both Ferdinand III and Ibn Nasr. In 1237, Granada accepted Ibn Nasr as its ruler. Ibn Hud was assassinated in January 1238 at the gates of Almería and was buried in Murcia.

== Bibliography ==
- Meri, Josef W. Meri and Bacharach, Jere L.: Medieval Islamic Civilization: An Encyclopedia. Routledge, London 2006, ISBN 0-415-96690-6.
- O'Callaghan, Joseph F.: Reconquest and crusade in medieval Spain. University of Pennsylvania Press, Philadelphia 2004, ISBN 0-8122-1889-2.
