= Tiedra =

Coordinates: 41°39′N 5°16′W

Tiedra, Spain
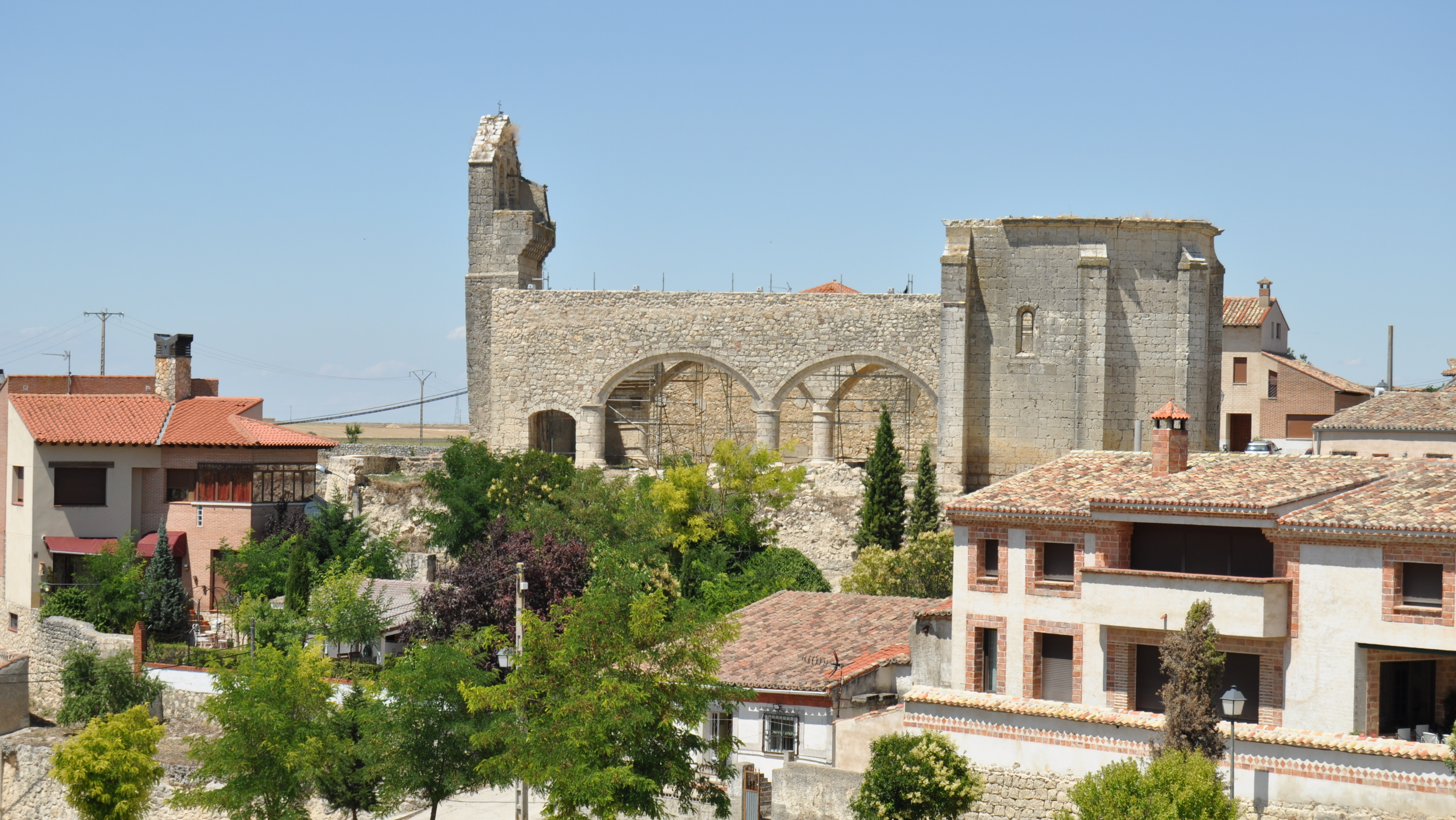

- Coat of arms
- Interactive map of Tiedra, Spain
- Country: Spain
- Autonomous community: Castile and León
- Province: Valladolid
- Municipality: Tiedra

Area
  - Total: 47 km^{2} (18 sq mi)

Population (2025-01-01)
  - Total: 273
  - Density: 5.8/km^{2} (15/sq mi)
- Time zone: UTC+1 (CET)
  - Summer (DST): UTC+2 (CEST)
- Website: www.tiedra.es

Tiedra is a municipality located in the province of Valladolid, Castile and León, Spain. According to the 2004 census (INE), the municipality has a population of 394 inhabitants.

www.tiedra.es

== See also ==
- Cuisine of the province of Valladolid
