= Sancha Ponce de Cabrera =

12th Century Leonese noblewoman

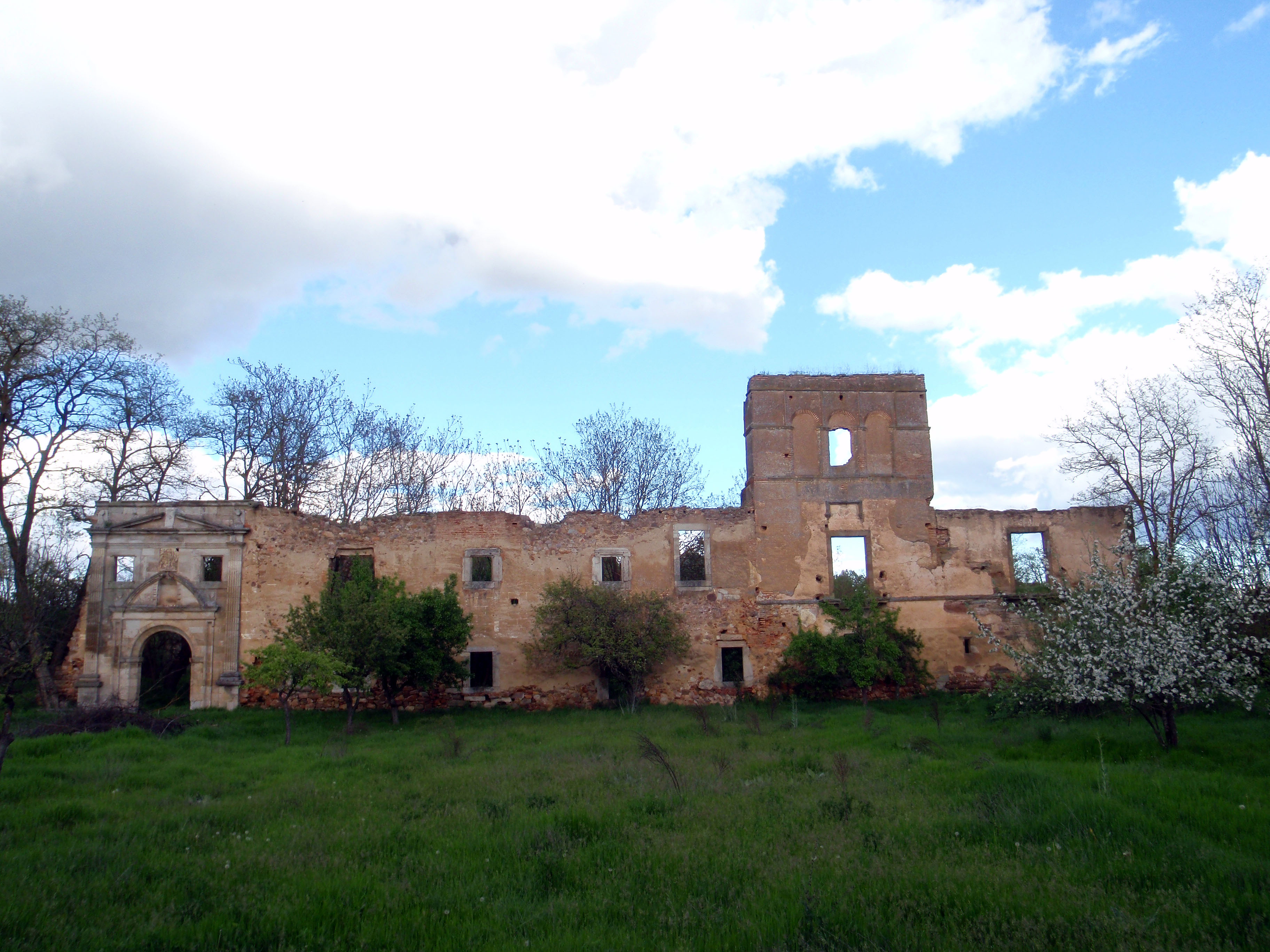
Ruins of the Monastery of Santa María de Nogales founded by Sancha and her husband and where both were buried

Sancha Ponce de Cabrera (died in 1176) was a daughter of Ponce Giraldo de Cabrera, and his first wife, Sancha Núñez. (Note: Even though she appears in some genealogies as the daughter of Ponce's second wife, María Fernández de Traba, years later, her children Juan, Fernando and Maria make a donation to the Monastery of Santa María de Meira in Galicia of some properties that they had inherited from their grandmother Sancha Núñez. Cfr. Fernández-Xesta y Vázquez (1991), pp. 60–61) (Note: See Colección documental do Mosteiro de Santa María de Meira, María Mercedes Domínguez Casal) She was the wife of the important magnate from the Kingdom of León, Vela Gutiérrez.

In 1149, King Alfonso VIII of León gave the couple as a wedding gift the villa of Nogales which they, in turn, donated to Aldara Pérez, abbess at the Monastery of San Miguel de Bóveda in Ourense. The abbess was entrusted with the task of bringing nuns from her monastery to the new one which would be governed by the Rule of Saint Benedict.

When Vela Gutiérrez, her husband, died, the nuns returned the new monastery, the construction of which was not yet completed, to Sancha who, in 1164, donated it to the Monastery of Santa María de Moreruela that had been founded by her father, Count Ponce, and it was then turned into a monastery governed by the Cistercian Order.

She had previously made arrangements to have three sarcophagi carved from stone; one for her deceased husband, another one for a son who had died previously, and one for herself. These were placed in the main chapel of the church of Nogales Abbey which had been consecrated in 1172. Sancha died in 1176 and her remains, as well as those of her husband and son, received burial at the newly founded monastery.

== Marriages and issue ==
The following children were born from her first marriage around 1149 with Vela Gutiérrez:

- Fernando Vela (died c. 1192), tenente in Asturias, Tineo, León, and Benavente. He married Sancha Álvarez, daughter of Álvaro Rodríguez de Sarria and Sancha Fernández de Traba. One of the children of this marriage, Juan Fernández de Cabrera, also governed Trastámara, Monterroso, Toroño, and Salamanca.
- Ponce Vela de Cabrera (died September 1202), the husband of Teresa Rodríguez Girón, daughter of Rodrigo Gutiérrez Girón and his first wife María de Guzmán.
- Pedro Vela (died. c. 1211/1212), was archdeacon at the Cathedral of Santiago de Compostela, Mayordomo mayor and chancellor of King Ferdinand II of León and later the abbot at the Monastery of Santa María la Real of Oseira.
- María Vela (died after 1204), abbess at the monastery founded by her parents.
- Juan Vela (died between 5 June and 7 September 1191) and buried at Monastery of Santa María de Moreruela founded by his maternal grandparents.

They could also have been the parents of a son named García Vela.

After her husband Vela died and between 1161 and before September 1164, she married Mendo or Menendo who could have been the Portuguese Count Menendo Gonçalves de Sousa, later married to Teresa Alfonso de Meneses, daughter of Alfonso Téllez de Meneses. (Note: Vela Gutiérrez was not a count and Sancha, while married to him, never appears with such title and it was not until 16 September of 1164 that she first appears as Countess Sancha after her second marriage to a count. Cfr. Fernández-Xesta y Vázquez (1991), p. 68) A son was born of this second marriage:

- Suero Menéndez, who was tentente in Villalpando and alférez of King Ferdinand II.

== Bibliography ==
- Calderón Medina, Inés (2008). "El impulso nobiliario a la expansión del Císter en el reino de León. La parentela de Ponce de Cabrera en los monasterios de Santa María de Moreruela y San Esteban de Nogales". Medievalismo. Revista de la Sociedad Española de Estudios Medievales (in Spanish) (18). Murcia: Servicio de Publicaciones de la Universidad de Murcia: 341–374. ISSN 1131-8155. Archived from the original on 2015-07-15.
- Calleja Puerta, Miguel (2001). El conde Suero Vermúdez, su parentela y su entorno social: La aristocracia asturleonesa en los siglos XI y XII (in Spanish). Oviedo: KRK Ediciones. ISBN 84-95401-68-1.
- Carriazo Rubio, Juan Luis (2002). La memoria del linaje: Los Ponce de León y sus antepasados a fines de la Edad Media (in Spanish). Sevilla: Universidad de Sevilla, Secretariado de Publicaciones. ISBN 84-472-0723-4.
- Enríquez de Salamanca Gómez, Almudena (2010). "El archivo del Monasterio de Santa María de Nogales en el Tumbo de Astorga (1639)". Documenta & Instrumenta (in Spanish). 8. Madrid: Universidad Complutense de Madrid, Servicio de Publicaciones: 47–66. ISSN 1697-4328.
- Fernández-Xesta y Vázquez, Ernesto (1991). Un magnate catalán en la corte de Alfonso VII: "Comes Poncius de Cabreira, Princeps Çemore" (in Spanish). Madrid: Prensa y Ediciones Iberoamericanas, D.L. ISBN 84-865-6841-2.
- Salazar y Acha, Jaime de (1985). "Una Familia de la Alta Edad Media: Los Velas y su Realidad Histórica". Estudios Genealógicos y Heráldicos (in Spanish). Madrid: Asociación Española de Estudios Genealógicos y Heráldicos. ISBN 84-398-3591-4.
- Torres Sevilla-Quiñones de León, Margarita Cecilia (1999). Linajes nobiliarios de León y Castilla. Siglos IX-XIII (in Spanish). Salamanca: Junta de Castilla y León, Consejería de educación y cultura. ISBN 84-7846-781-5.
