= Ponce Vela de Cabrera =

Ponce Vela de Cabrera, also known as Ponce Vélaz de Cabrera (died 24 September 1202), was a noble from the Kingdom of León who played an important role during the reign of Alfonso IX. Through one of his sons descends the Ponce de León, "one of the most illustrious aristocratic houses of the later Middle Ages".

== Biography ==
He was the son of Vela Gutiérrez, son of count Gutierre Vermúdez and countess Toda, daughter of count Pedro Fróilaz de Traba, and of Sancha Ponce de Cabrera, daughter of Ponce Giraldo de Cabrera and Sancha Núñez. Ponce had several brothers and sisters: Fernando, Pedro, María, and Juan Vela.

He starts to appear in royal charters in 1176, and served as the alférez of King Alfonso IX in 1185 and in the following year, in which he was also appointed tenant-in-chief of Mansilla and other villages and regions that had been governed by his relatives count Suero Vermúdez and Pedro Alfonso, including Tineo and Babia, Gozón, and Cabezón. He also governed Mayorga, Zamora, and El Bierzo.

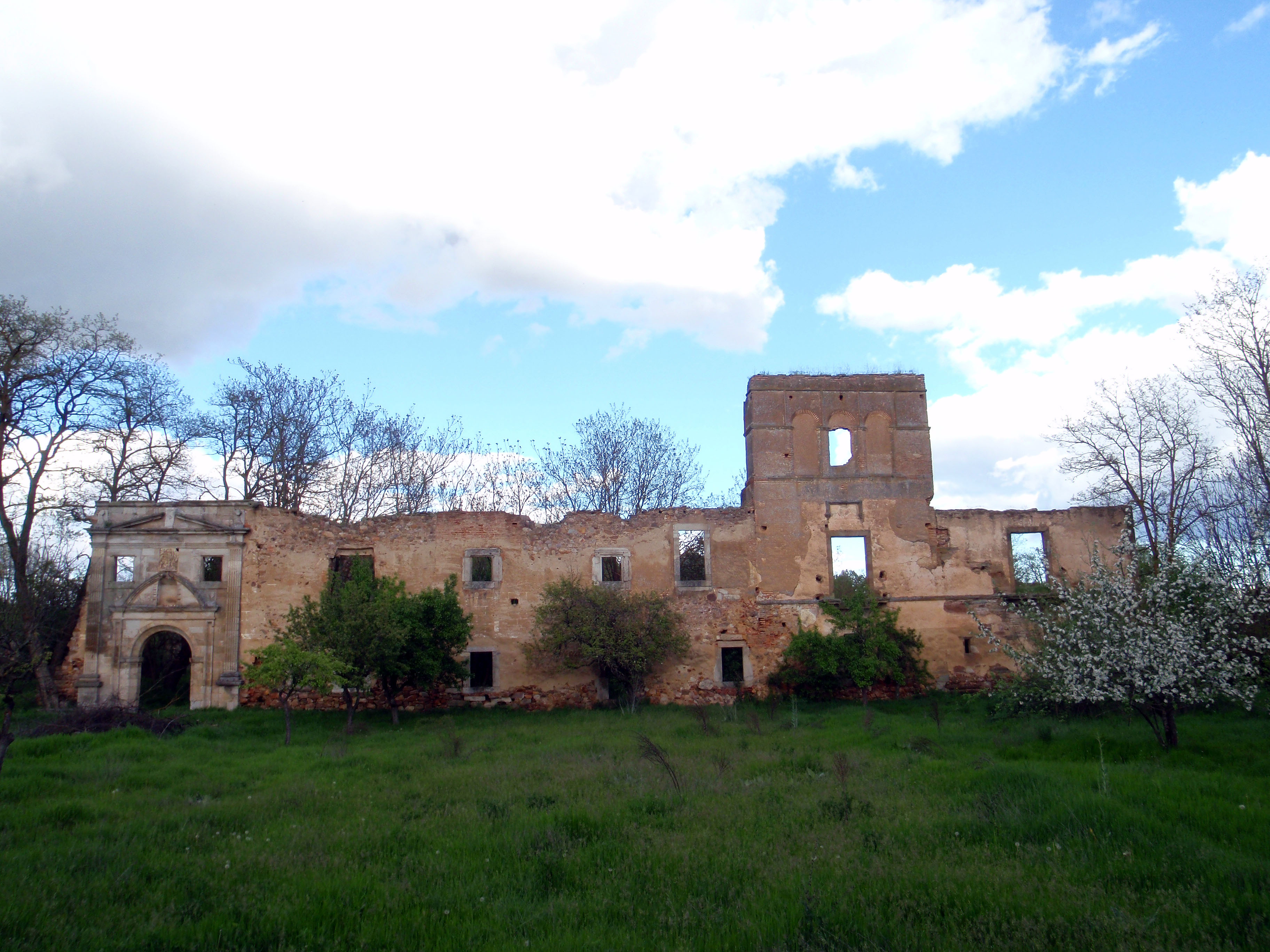
Ruins of the Monastery of Santa Maria de Nogales

He died on 24 September 1202 and was buried in the Monastery of Santa María de Nogales in San Esteban de Nogales that had been founded by his parents.

== Marriage and issue ==
Count Ponce Vela married Teresa Rodríguez Giron, daughter of Rodrigo Gutiérrez Girón and his first wife, María de Guzmán. In 1195, Pontius Velez una cum uxore mea, Tharesia Rodrigues (Ponce Vela with my wife, Teresa Rodríguez) donated one-third of Granucillo that he had inherited from his parents to the Monastery of Nogales. The offspring of this marriage were:

- Juan Ponce de Cabrera
- Fernando Ponce de Cabrera
- Pedro Ponce de Cabrera (died between 1248 and 1254), married Aldonza Alfonso, illegitimate daughter of King Alfonso IX and his mistress Aldonza Martínez de Silva This marriage gave rise to the powerful house of the Ponce de León which held titles in the late Middle Ages of the dukedoms of Arcos and Cádiz.

== Bibliography ==
- Barton, Simon (1992). "Two Catalan magnates in the courts of the kings of León-Castile: the careers of Ponce de Cabrera and Ponce de Minerva re-examined". Journal of Medieval History. 18 (3): 233–266. doi:10.1016/0304-4181(92)90022-q. ISSN 0304-4181.
- Calderón Medina, Inés (2008). "El impulso nobiliario a la expansión del Císter en el reino de León. La parentela de Ponce de Cabrera en los monasterios de Santa María de Moreruela y San Esteban de Nogales". Medievalismo. Revista de la Sociedad Española de Estudios Medievales (in Spanish) (18). Murcia: Servicio de Publicaciones de la Universidad de Murcia: 341–374. ISSN 1131-8155.
- Calleja Puerta, Miguel (2001). El conde Suero Vermúdez, su parentela y su entorno social: La aristocracia asturleonesa en los siglos XI y XII (in Spanish). Oviedo: KRK Ediciones. ISBN 84-95401-68-1.
- Carriazo Rubio, Juan Luis (2002). La memoria del linaje: Los Ponce de León y sus antepasados a fines de la Edad Media (in Spanish). Seville: Universidad de Sevilla, Secretariado de Publicaciones. ISBN 84-472-0723-4.
- Salazar y Acha, Jaime de (1985). Una Familia de la Alta Edad Media: Los Velas y su Realidad Histórica (en Estudios Genealógicos y Heráldicos) (in Spanish). Asociación Española de Estudios Genealógicos y Heráldicos. ISBN 84-398-3591-4.
- Torres Sevilla-Quiñones de León, Margarita Cecilia (1999). Linajes nobiliarios de León y Castilla: Siglos IX-XIII (in Spanish). Salamanca: Junta de Castilla y León, Consejería de educación y cultura. ISBN 84-7846-781-5.
