= Pedro Ponce de Cabrera =

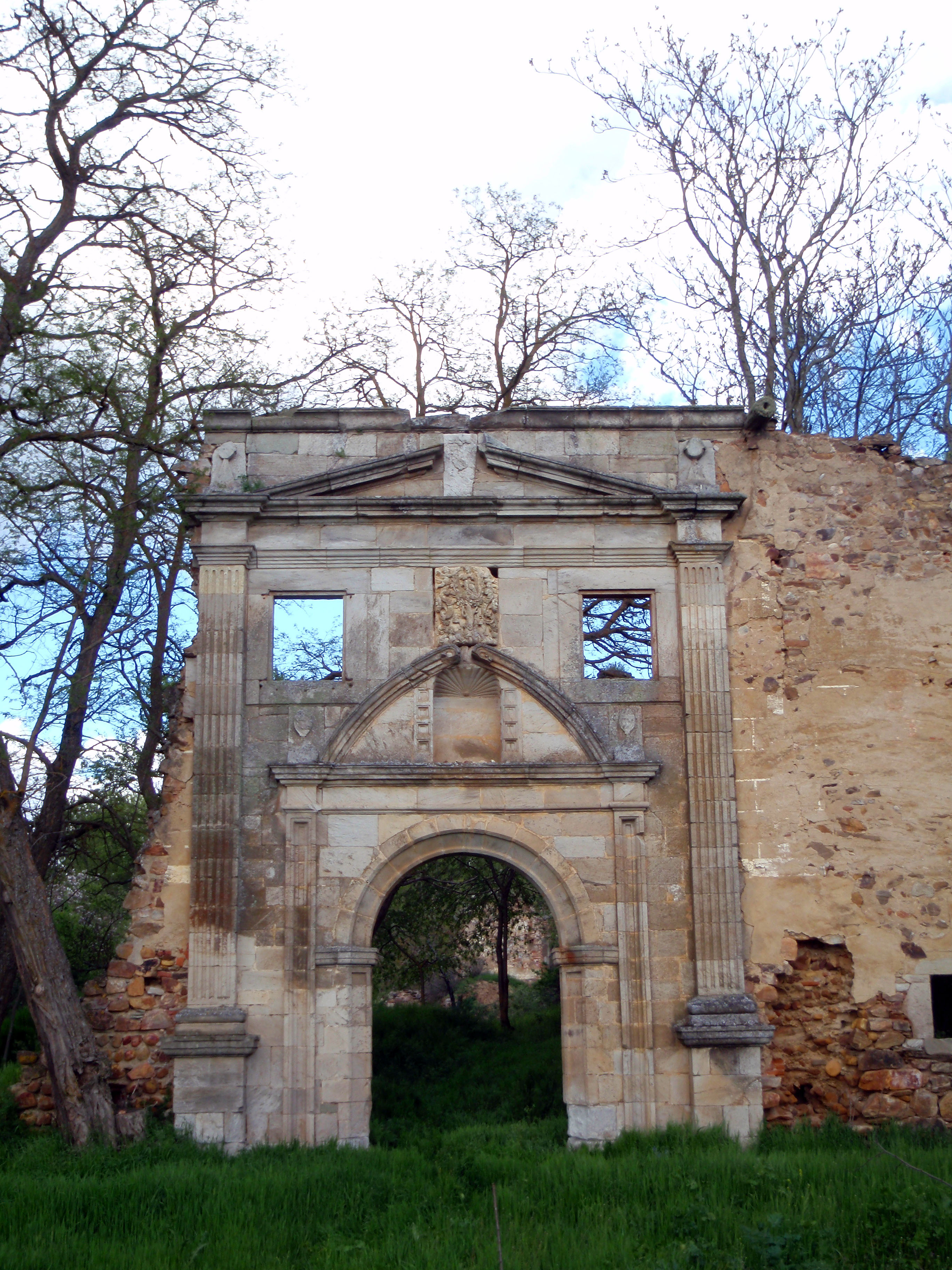
Ruins of the Monastery of Santa María de Nogales where Pedro Ponce and his wife Aldonza were buried

Pedro Ponce de Cabrera (died 1248/1254), (Note: According to historian Diego Ortiz de Zuñiga, Pedro Ponce died in 1248, although he appears confirming a charter in the same year. He had already died by 1254 as evidenced in a donation made by his widow Aldonza to the Monastery of Sahagún in that year.) was a magnate from the Kingdom of León, son of Ponce Vela de Cabrera and his wife Teresa Rodríguez Girón, daughter of Rodrigo Gutiérrez Girón and his first wife María de Guzmán. From his marriage to Aldonza Alfonso de León, illegitimate daughter of Alfonso IX and his mistress Aldonza Martínez de Silva, «...would descend one of the most important and aristocratic Spanish families of the Late Middle Ages, the Ponce de León, so relevant in the conquest of Andalusia where they were to receive over time the Marquisate of Cádiz and Duchy of Arcos».

== Biographical sketch ==
Probably born near the end of the 12th century as he appears described in a document in July 1202 as a minor, Pedro Ponce de Cabrera was an important magnate during the reigns of King Alfonso IX, whom he served as his alférez, and of his successor, Ferdinand III of Castile. In February 1221 he was part of the entourage that accompanied Infanta Eleanor of Castile, daughter of King Alfonso VIII of Castile, to Ágreda for her wedding with King James I of Aragon.

He played an active role in the reconquista campaigns of King Fernando III in Andalusia and fought against the moors in Seville, Lora del Río and Marchena. After the conquest of Córdoba in 1236, he was awarded land in the repartimiento while his son, also benefited a few years later, in 1248 from the partition and distribution of land after the conquest of Seville.

Pedro Ponce de Cabrera was buried in the chapel of Saint Benito at the Monastery of Santa María de Nogales, founded by his grandparents Vela Gutiérrez and Sancha Ponce de Cabrera. (Note: In November 1264, the widow Aldonza Alfonso made a donation to the Monastery of Nogales where she indicates the exact place where her husband was buried: "Conuscuda cosa sea a todos cuantos esta carta vieren como yo doña Aldonza Alfonso do por la alma de don Pedro Ponce de Cabrera, mio marido, que jace sepultado en el monasterio de Nogales, en la capilla del señor San Benito e en remisión de mis pecados…." (Let it be known to whoever reads this charter how I, doña Aldonza Alfonso, make this donation for the soul of Pedro Ponce de Cabrera, my husband, who is buried in the chapel of Saint Benito, and for the remission of my sins).) His widow Aldonza was also buried in the same chapel. (Note: The following epitaph was carved in her tomb:HIC IACET SERENISSIMA INFANS DOMINA ALDONCIA ALFONSI, ALFONSI NONI LEGIONIS REGIS FILIA, CONIVX DOMINI PETRI PONCII DE CABRERA, FILII COMITIS D. PONCII VELA, NEPOTIS ILLVSTRIVM ET MAGNIFICORVM FVNDATORVM HVIVS CCOENOBII. OBIIT CIRCA ANNOS CHRISTI. M. CC. LX. VI. CVM RECENS SACRATA ESSET NOVA ECCLESIA.)

== Marriage and issue ==
He married Aldonza Alfonso, illegitimate daughter of King Alfonso IX of León and his mistress Aldonza Martínez de Silva, sometime before 10 June 1230 when both appear together making a donation to the Monastery of Santa María de Nogales. On 7 October 1235 he executed a deed whereby he specified the arras to be received by his wife. They had the following children:

- Fernán Pérez Ponce de León (died in 1291 in Jerez de la Frontera), Lord of Puebla de Asturias, Cangas and Tineo, adelantado of the frontier of Andalusia, Mayordomo mayor of King Alfonso X of Castile and ayo of Fernando IV of Castile. He and his wife Urraca Gutiérrez were buried in the main chapel of the church of the Monastery of Moreruela;
- Ruy Pérez Ponce de León (m. 1295), elected 15th Grand Master of the Order of Calatrava in 1284;
- Juan Pérez Ponce de León, who benefited from the distribution of land after the conquest of Seville in 1248.
- Pedro Pérez Ponce de León (died c. 1280), comendador of the Order of Santiago;
- Elvira Ponce de León
- Álvaro Ponce de León
- Juana Ponce de León

== Bibliography ==
- Calderón Medina, Inés (2008). "El impulso nobiliario a la expansión del Císter en el reino de León. La parentela de Ponce de Cabrera en los monasterios de Santa María de Moreruela y San Esteban de Nogales". Medievalismo. Revista de la Sociedad Española de Estudios Medievales (in Spanish) (18). Murcia: Servicio de Publicaciones de la Universidad de Murcia: 341–374. ISSN 1131-8155. Archived from the original on 2015-07-15.
- Carriazo Rubio, Juan Luis (2002). La memoria del linaje: Los Ponce de León y sus antepasados a fines de la Edad Media (in Spanish). Sevilla: Universidad de Sevilla, Secretariado de Publicaciones. ISBN 84-472-0723-4.
- Cavero Domínguez, Gregoria (2001). Colección documental del Monasterio de San Esteban de Nogales (in Spanish). León: Centro de Estudios e Investigación «San Isidoro». ISBN 84-87667-48-1.
- Fernández-Xesta y Vázquez, Ernesto (1991). Un magnate catalán en la corte de Alfonso VII: "Comes Poncius de Cabreira, Princeps Çemore" (in Spanish). Madrid: Prensa y Ediciones Iberoamericanas, D.L. ISBN 84-865-6841-2.
- García, Charles (2002). "Une allégorie politique ambivalente. La chèvre et la dynastie des Cabrera dans le León du XII siècle". Cahiers de linguistique et de civilisation hispaniques medievales (in French) (2). París: Université Paris-Nord: 363–384. ISSN 0396-9045.
- Manrique, Ángel (1642). Annales Cistercienses. Vol. II. Madrid. OCLC 164918883.
- Salazar y Acha, Jaime de (1985). "Una Familia de la Alta Edad Media: Los Velas y su Realidad Histórica". Estudios Genealógicos y Heráldicos (in Spanish). Madrid: Asociación Española de Estudios Genealógicos y Heráldicos. ISBN 84-398-3591-4.
- Torres Sevilla-Quiñones de León, Margarita Cecilia (1999). Linajes nobiliarios de León y Castilla. Siglos IX-XIII (in Spanish). Salamanca: Junta de Castilla y León, Consejería de educación y cultura. ISBN 84-7846-781-5.
