= Fernán Pérez Ponce de León =

Spanish noble (d 1291)

Fernán Pérez Ponce de León (died 1291) was a senior Spanish noble. He was lord of Puebla de Asturias, Cangas and Tineo, Adelantado (governor) of the Andalucian frontier, and Mayordomo mayor (high steward) to Alfonso X of Castile.

== Biography ==
He was son of Pedro Ponce de Cabrera and Aldonza Alfonso de León, illegitimate daughter of King Alfonso IX of León.

His father died around 1248, and Fernán Pérez succeeded him as head of the House of Ponce de León. He and his siblings were the first to use "Ponce"—previously merely a patronymic—as a surname; this, combined with the heraldic adoption of a purple lion on a silver field (replacing the goats of the Cabrera family), signaled the new era of the line that would later be known as the Ponce de Leóns.

Fernán Pérez Ponce held the lordships of Cangas and La Puebla de Asturias, but he did not achieve true prominence until 1273, during the assembly (ayuntamiento) at Almagro. At this gathering, which brought together the kingdom's leading magnates and knights, Alfonso X was forced to reverse key aspects of his policies in the face of widespread discontent.

Although nothing is known of the stance Fernán Pérez Ponce took during those conflicts, the Chronicle still records his presence alongside the King at critical moments in the following years. However, he soon distanced himself from the monarch, apparently due to his disagreement with the decision to sideline the sons of Fernando de la Cerda in favor of the future Sancho IV. Fernán Pérez renounced his allegiance to the Kingdom and pledged vassalage to Peter III of Aragon, who granted him the town of Frescano. By 1277, he was in exile in France, where he became a vassal of King Philip III, promising his aid against any man—except the Infantes de la Cerda. Around that same time, several hundred Castilian knights, led by Juan Núñez I de Lara had crossed into France to form an army with which to invade Castile and install Alfonso de la Cerda, son of Fernando and the French king's nephew, as heir.

This conflict between Fernán Pérez Ponce and Alfonso X prompted the Infante Sancho, who also rebelled against his father a few years later, to attempt to win him over to his cause in 1282, alongside other disaffected knights. However, the nobleman’s response was emphatically negative. Far from supporting the rebellion, he reconciled with Alfonso X and joined the faction loyal to him in Seville. From that time on, he remained steadfastly loyal, rendering the King significant service.

Leading a force of nine hundred lances, he routed the Infante Sancho’s far more numerous partisans near Córdoba, inflicting heavy losses upon them. He subsequently took part in the capture of Mérida on Don Alfonso’s behalf. These successes, achieved at such a critical juncture for the King, earned him the monarch's trust and led to his appointment as Mayordomo mayor (High steward), a title he held by January 1284. That same month, Alfonso X drafted his will, naming Pérez Ponce as one of his executors alongside his closest inner circle; he is listed immediately after the King's children, the Infantes Juan and Beatriz, and the Archbishop of Seville, Remondo. Alfonso refers to him as "our kinsman" (cormano), acknowledging the close blood ties between them.

He subsequently extended this same loyalty to the successor to the throne, Sancho IV, whom he served with equal dedication.

As Adelantado Mayor de la Frontera, a position he assumed in 1285, he negotiated the 1291 truces with the Emirate of Granada, which were crucial for countering the Marinid threat. At that time, and indeed since 1284, his brother Ruy Pérez Ponce de León was Grand Master of the Order of Calatrava, and another brother, Pedro, was the Grand Commander of Order of Santiago. The lineage’s influence on the Kingdom’s military affairs during a period of acute tension along the frontier was extraordinary. The clearest reflection of this power, and of the new monarch’s trust, was the appointment of Fernán Pérez Ponce as tutor to the Infante Ferdinand. He undoubtedly succeeded in winning the boy's affection. In 1303, the Infante granted the town of Bornos to his former tutor's son, not only in recognition of the son's own services but also "for the upbringing that Don Ferrand Pérez Ponce, his father, provided Us." Upon Ferrand Pérez's death in 1292, his brother Ruy, Master of Calatrava, was appointed as the Infante's new tutor.

The place and circumstances of his death in 1292 are unclear. Fernán Pérez Ponce was buried in the Cistercian Monastery of Moreruela, where his wife, Urraca Gutiérrez de Meneses, was laid to rest years later.

=== Marriage and children ===
He married Urraca Gutierrez de Meneses and had following children :

- Pedro Ponce de León (died 1314), his successor
- Gutierre Ponce de León
- Fernando Ponce de León (died 1331), married Isabel de Guzmán, daughter of Alonso Pérez de Guzmán
- Aldonza Fernández Ponce de León (died young)
- Beatriz Ponce de León (died 1330), married Juan Alonso Pérez de Guzmán y Coronel
- Juana Ponce de León, mother of Alonso Meléndez de Guzmán and Eleanor de Guzmán
