= Infanta Sancha =

Infanta Sancha may refer to:

== Navarre ==
- Sancha Sánchez (died 960), daughter of King Sancho I of Pamplona

== León ==
- Sancha of León (c. 1018–1067), daughter of King Alfonso V
- Sancha, heiress of León (1191/2–before 1243), daughter of King Alfonso IX

== Castile (and León) ==
- Sancha Raimúndez (c. 1095/1102–1159), daughter of Queen Urraca
- Sancha of Castile, Queen of Navarre (c. 1139–1177/79), daughter of King Alfonso VII and the first wife Berenguela
- Sancha of Castile, Queen of Aragon (1154/5–1208), daughter of King Alfonso VII and the second wife Richeza

== Aragon ==
- Sancha of Aragon (died 1097) (born c. 1045), daughter of King Ramiro I
- Sancha of Aragon, Countess of Toulouse (1186–1241), daughter of King Alfonso II
- Sancia of Majorca (c. 1281–1345), daughter of King James II of Majorca

== Portugal ==
- Sancha, Lady of Alenquer (1180–1229), daughter of King Sancho I
- Sancha of Portugal (born 1264), daughter of King Afonso III

== See also ==
- Sancha Alfonso of León (c. 1220–1270), illegitimate daughter of Alfonso IX
- Sancha of Castile (disambiguation)
- Sancha of León (disambiguation)
- Sancha of Aragon (disambiguation)
- Queen Sancha (disambiguation)
