= Queen Sancha =

Queen Sancha, Queen Sanchia or Queen Sancia may refer to:

- Sancha Sánchez (died 960), wife of King Ordoño II of León
- Sancha of León (c. 1018–1067), wife of King Ferdinand I of León
- Sancha of Castile, Queen of Navarre (c. 1139–1177/79), wife of King Sancho VI of Navarre
- Sancha of Castile, Queen of Aragon (1154/5–1208), wife of King Alfonso II of Aragon
- Sancha, heiress of León (1191/2–before 1243), briefly suo jure Queen of León and Galicia
- Sanchia of Provence (c. 1225–1261) , wife of Richard of Cornwall, King of Germany
- Sancia of Majorca (c. 1281–1345), wife of King Robert of Naples

== See also ==
- Sancha of Castile (disambiguation)
- Sancha of León (disambiguation)
- Infanta Sancha (disambiguation)
