= Pedro Ponce de León (Adelantado) =

Spanish nobleman

Pedro Ponce de León (died 1314) was a Spanish nobleman, lord of Pueblo de Asturias, Cangas and Tineo. He was Adelantado (governor) of the Andalusian frontier and Galicia, and Mayordomo mayor (high steward) to King Ferdinand IV of Castile.

== Biography ==
Pedro Ponce was the son of Fernán Pérez Ponce de León, who had served as tutor to Ferdinand IV and as Adelantado Mayor, and Urraca Gutiérrez de Meneses. His paternal grandmother, Aldonza Alfonso de León, was the illegitimate daughter of King Alfonso IX of León, a connection that linked him to the Castilian-Leonese royal lineage.

Pedro Ponce entered political life in late 1291 following his father's death. As the eldest son, he assumed leadership of the family. He also inherited from his father the right, held by all ricoshombres (high-ranking nobles), to receive military stipends from the Crown.

In this regard, his earnings, derived primarily from taxes paid to the King in León and Asturias, were not among the highest within the nobility. They amounted to only half of what prominent figures such as the Infante Juan or Juan Núñez de Lara received. Like his father, Pedro Ponce de León served with his knights in the defense of Andalusia, receiving an additional stipend drawn from taxes paid by the Jewish community of Córdoba (1294).

This nobleman’s involvement in court politics intensified after the death of King Sancho IV of Castile in 1295 and the succession by the underaged Ferdinand IV. This marked the beginning of a turbulent period for Castile, characterized by an Aragonese invasion, Portuguese intervention, attempts to partition the kingdom between the Infante Juan and Alfonso de la Cerda, and constant demands from the nobility. Only the continuous granting of revenues and offices to the nobility by the King allowed him to remain on the throne. Pedro Ponce was among the greatest beneficiaries of this process. In the early months of the new reign, he was appointed Mayordomo mayor (High Steward), the most important court office.

He succeeded his uncle, Ruy Pérez Ponce de León, the Master of the Order of Calatrava, who had died shortly before. In October 1296, Pedro became "Adelantado mayor of the Frontier" (Andalusia); he would not be removed from this post until at least October 1298. It appears that for most of his tenure as "Adelantado", he was absent from his jurisdiction, as he was more focused on the civil conflicts unfolding in the northern part of the kingdom.

In late 1298, Pedro Ponce became a vassal of the Infante Juan, who had proclaimed himself King of León. Consequently, he lost the Andalusian "Adelantado" position. He returned in Ferdinand IV’s favor, having been won over by the grant of Cangas and Tineo in Asturias, secured through the efforts of the Queen Mother María de Molina. Also at her urging, Pedro was once again appointed Mayordomo Mayor around November 1302. He held this position until approximately September 1305.

During the new phase that began in 1302, when the monarch came of age, he had accepted his former enemies, his uncle the Infante Juan and Juan Núñez de Lara, as his close confidants. Their privileged position aroused the suspicion of the rest of the nobility, who gathered in Valladolid that same year to express their unease. Pedro Ponce took part in that assembly of "ricoshombres" (high-ranking nobles). However, in the years that followed, he would alternately ally himself with one royal confidant or the other, sometimes even acting against Ferdinand IV, always securing gains for his services. Such behavior fostered deep mistrust of the Leonese noble on the part of the monarch. The last documented activity carried out by Pedro Ponce was his tenure as "Adelantado mayor" of Galicia. He held this office from June 1310 to May 1311.

=== Marriage and children ===
Pedro Ponce married Sancha Gil de Braganza; their children were

- Ferrán Pérez Ponce (died c.1330), Lord of la Puebla de Asturias. Never married, no issue.
- Rodrigo Pérez Ponce de León (died c.1354), Lord of la Puebla de Asturias. Married Isabel de la Cerda, no issue.
- Isabel Ponce de León (died 1367), married Pedro Fernández de Castro, mother of Juana de Castro, Queen of Castile for one day.
- Urraca Ponce de León, married Enrique Enríquez the Younger.
- Juana Ponce de León (d. before 1344), married Juan Alfonso of Portugal, the illegitimate son of King Denis I of Portugal.
