= Vela Gutiérrez =

Leonese nobleman (died 1160)

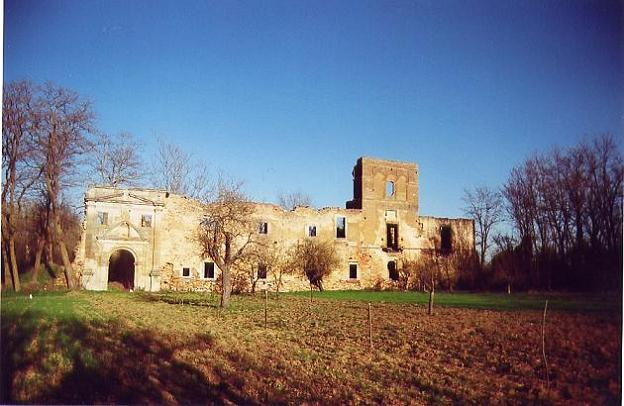
Ruins of Santa María de Nogales: the original foundation was a Benedictine convent established by Vela in 1150, but it went defunct by 1164, when it was refounded as a Cistercian monastery.

Vela Gutiérrez (died 1160) was a Leonese nobleman. He first founded the convent of Santa María de Nogales in 1150, but it failed and was re-founded as a monastery at later date.

Vela was a son of Count Gutierre Vermúdez. Highly unusually for the son of a count in twelfth-century León, he never attained the rank of count himself. He was addressed only as "my knight" (militi meo) on 14 May 1149, when the Emperor Alfonso VII granted him the village of Morales del Rey with the territory of Nogales in hereditary right "with all its appurtenances ... for his services" (cum toto eius honore ... pro servitio). This likely indicates that he was then serving in the royal military household, it may also indicate that he himself was knighted by Alfonso. After the knighting of the emperor's second son, Fernando, Vela was appointed to serve as his majordomo.

Vela married Sancha Ponce de Cabrera, daughter of Ponce Giraldo de Cabrera. He adopted the arms of her family and had them displayed on the tombs of himself and his wife in the monastery of Nogales. Vela and Sancha donated some houses they owned in the city of León to the monastery of Vega. Beginning sometime after 23 April 1148, probably in 1149, he ruled the fief of La Cabrera, which was granted him by the Crown probably at the request of his father-in-law, who had ceded it for just this purpose, probably to serve as a wedding gift. Vela governed the territory until sometime before 29 September 1156, when it had passed back to Ponce Giraldo.

In April 1150 Vela and Sancha founded a Benedictine nunnery at Nogales with some nuns from the Galician house of San Miguel de Bóveda, then just a priory of San Clodio del Ribeiro. In the foundation charter of the nunnery, which was written up at Salamanca before his father-in-law, Vela thanks Ponce for the help he received from him in acquiring the property on which the convent was to be built from Alfonso. The statement of donation reads thus:

In the name of Our Lord Jesus Christ, amen. I, Vela Gutiérrez, jointly with my wife, Sancha Ponce, give out of goodwill and voluntarily to God and to you, Lady Aldoara Pérez, and to your successors, for the remedy of our souls and those of our parents and of all the late faithful, that hereditary property that the emperor gave us in the valley of the Eria, namely, the village they call Nogales. . .

Within ten years the new foundation had failed. According to a sixteenth-century source, Vela never completed the buildings of his monastery and after his death the nuns returned to Galicia, ceding Nogales back to Sancha. The sixteenth-century tumbo (cartulary) of Nogales blames the lack of resolve and discipline of the nuns. In 1164 the property of the defunct convent was given by Vela's widow to the abbey of Moreruela, which refounded it with some Cistercian monks. Besides the abbey which he had attempted to found, Vela made a pair of donations twelve years apart (1 March 1143 and 20 March 1155) to Sobrado dos Monxes with his mother, Toda Pérez, and uncle, Rodrigo Pérez de Traba. On 23 and 29 June 1141 Vela and his cousin Gonzalo Alfonso had alienated their portions of the monastery of Lapedo to Gonzalo's brother Pedro Alfonso.

Vela and Sancha had six sons—Fernando, García, Juan, Pedro, Ponce and Rodrigo—and one daughter, María. On 5 June 1181 the three brothers Fernando, Juan and Pedro and Suero Meléndez granted an estate they had inherited at Gema to their sister on the condition that after her death it would fall to the Order of Fontevrault and a convent be established there. The laymen of the Vélaz family, however, retained the right to veto the election of a prioress, who was to be from among their kin. The laywomen of the Vélaz clan were given the option of residing and being cared for in the convent without having to take the habit.

== Sources ==
- Barton, Simon. The Aristocracy in Twelfth-Century León and Castile. Cambridge: Cambridge University Press, 1997.
- Reilly, Bernard F. The Kingdom of León-Castilla under King Alfonso VII, 1126–1157. Philadelphia: University of Pennsylvania Press, 1998.
