= Battle of Arjona =

Battle of Arjona (1297)
- Part of the Spanish Reconquista
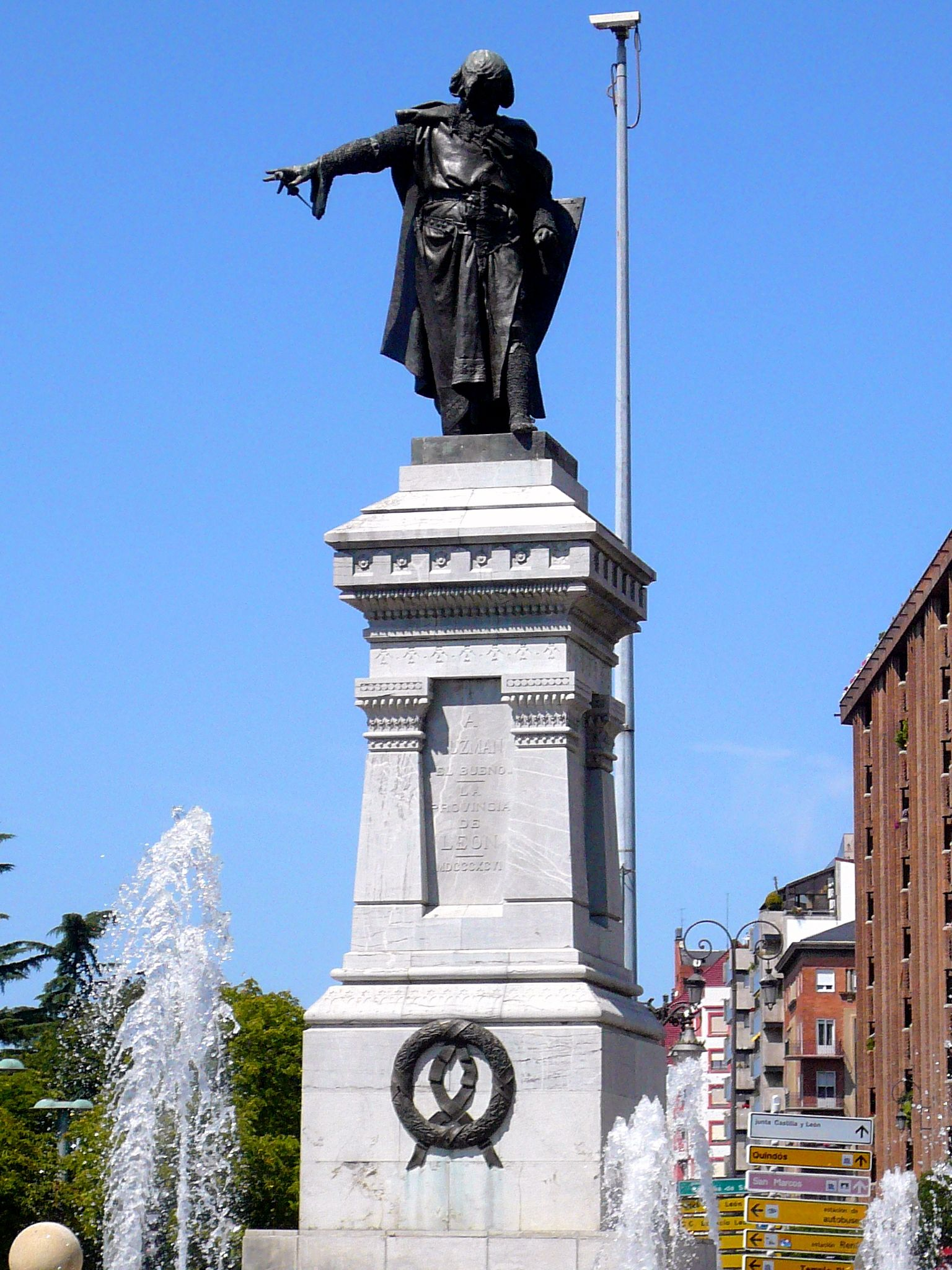
- Statue of Guzmán el Bueno
Date	1297
Location	Arjona, Crown of Castile 37°56′6″N 4°3′25″W
Result	Granadan victory

Belligerents
Crown of Castile	Emirate of Granada

Commanders and leaders
Guzman el Bueno; Infante Henrique; Pedro Pascual (executed)	Muhammed II

Strength
Unknown	Unknown

Casualties and losses
Heavy	Unknown

The battle of Arjona was a military engagement between the Granadans and the Castilians near Arjona. The battle ended in a resounding Granadan victory.

== Background ==
After the defeat of Iznalloz, the Castilian knight Ruy Pérez Ponce de León succumbed to his wounds a few days later. The death of this knight weakened the power of the ruling queen, María de Molina, who invoked the loyalty of Guzman el Bueno and earnestly requested that he defend Andalusia, threatened by the Sultan of Granada. The Granadan Sultan, Muhammad II, did not cease to make incursions into Christian lands, devastating the fields and keeping the inhabitants of the border towns in constant alarm, with Arjona being one of the points that suffered the most from the attacks of the Muslims. The Queen begged Guzman to come to the front of the Christian army to punish the Moors and pacify the border. Guzman did so.

== Battle ==
In 1297, Guzman set out to intercept the Granadans. Guzman was joined by Infante Don Henrique, who was the great-uncle of Ferdinand IV. Arriving at Andújar, they received word that the cavalry of the Granadan Sultan had been camped for three days near Arjona, ravaging their fields and looting the farms and cottages. The Castilians met the Granadans at Arjona, and the fierce battle ensued. The Granadan cavalry already charged against the Castilian vanguard, broke through it, scattered it, and penetrated into the Castilian camp until they managed to knock down the Infante from his horse.

The Infante was almost killed and was averted from death because Guzmán, seeing him in such great danger, charged against it at the head of a force and enveloping him among his own, saved him from death. The majority of the Castilians were killed, and only a few survived and were taken captives and imprisoned at Granada. Pedro Pascual, bishop of Jaén, was taken prisoner and executed 3 years later.

== Sources ==
- Miguel Lafuente Alcántara (1852), Historia de Granada comprendiendo la de sus 4 provincias Almería, Jaen, Granada y Málaga desde remotos tiempos hasta nuestro días, Vol, 1.
- Juan González y Sánchez (1905), História de la ciudad de Arjona desde su fundación hasta nuestros días.
- Francisco Javier Parcerisa (1850), Recuerdos y bellezas de España.
