= Sancha of León (disambiguation) =

Sancha of León (1013–1067) was a princess and queen of León.

Sancha of León may also refer to:

- Sancha Raimúndez (c. 1095/1102–1159), Leonese infanta, daughter of Queen Urraca and Raymond of Burgundy
- Sancha, heiress of León (1191/2–after 1230), eldest child of Alfonso IX of León by his first wife, Theresa of Portugal
- Sancha Alfonso of León (c. 1220–1270), illegitimate daughter of Alfonso IX

== See also ==
- Sancha of Castile (disambiguation)
- Infanta Sancha (disambiguation)
