= Rodrigo Alfonso de León =

Spanish nobleman

- Lord of Alexer; Adelantado of León
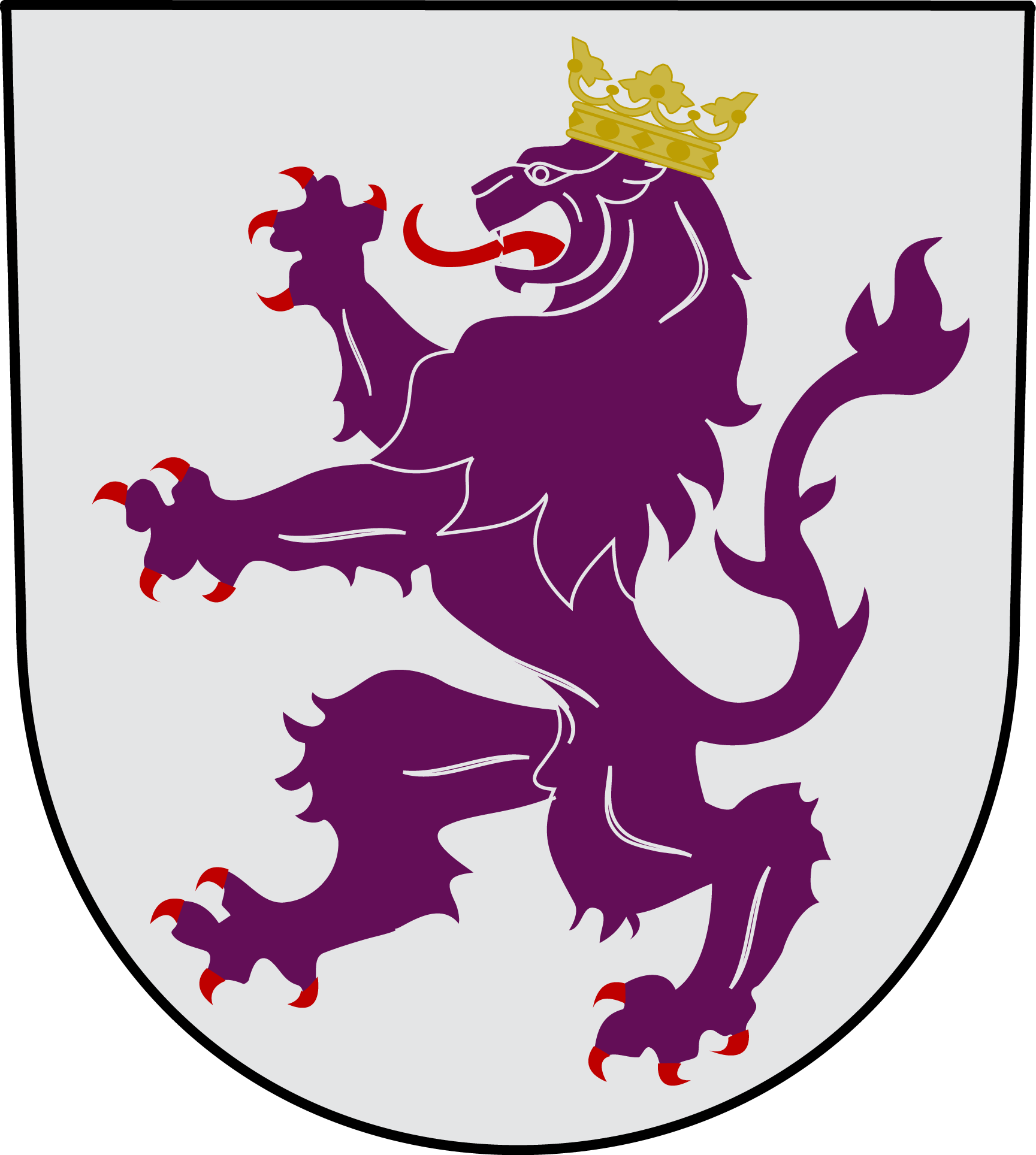
- Born: 1214; Iberian Peninsula
- Died: 1268 (aged 53–54); Iberian Peninsula
- Father: Alfonso IX of Leon
- Mother: Aldonza Martínez de Silva

Rodrigo Alfonso de León (1214-1268) was a Spanish nobleman, Lord of Alexer and Adelantado of León.

== Biography ==
Rodrigo was the illegitimate son of Alfonso IX of Leon and his mistress Aldonza Martínez de Silva. His wife was Inés Rodríguez de Cabrera.
