= Battle of Iznalloz =

Military conflict in Spain in 1295 CE

- Part of the Spanish Reconquista
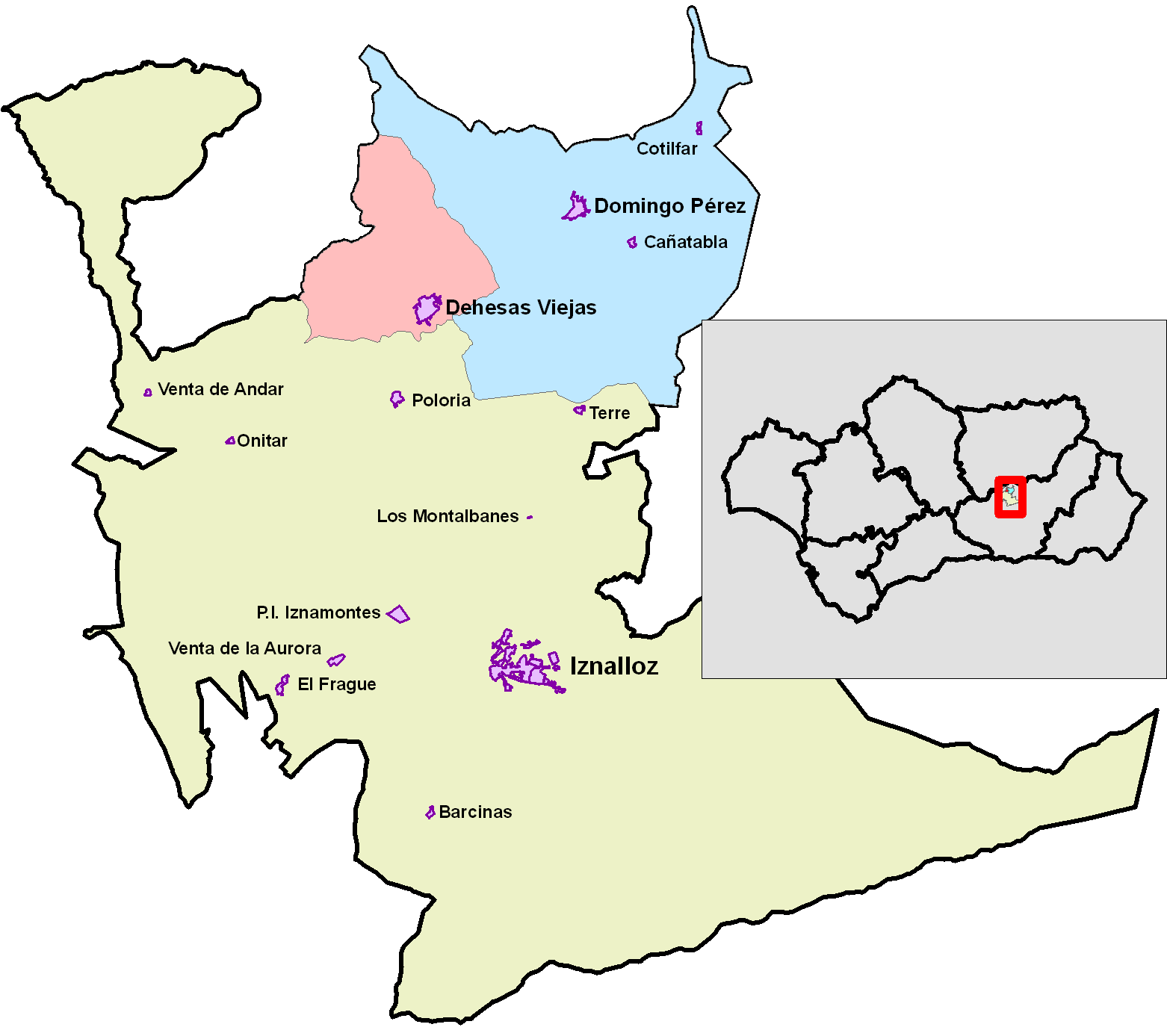
- Location of the town of Iznalloz within the Province of Granada, Spain.
| Date | 1295 |
| Location | Iznalloz, Province of Granada, Spain |
| Result | Granadan victory |

Belligerents
| Kingdom of Castile; Order of Calatrava; Order of Santiago | Emirate of Granada |

Commanders and leaders
| Ruy Pérez Ponce de León (WIA) | Muhammed II |

Strength
| Unknown | Unknown |

Casualties and losses
| Heavy | Unknown |

The Battle of Iznalloz took place during the Spanish Reconquista in the Province of Granada near the city of Iznalloz, north of the city of Granada in 1295. The battle pitted the troops of the Emirate of Granada, commanded by Muhammad II the Sultan of Granada against those of the Kingdom of Castile who were commanded by the Grand Master of the Order of Calatrava, Ruy Pérez Ponce de León on behalf of Sancho IV of Castile. The battle resulted in a catastrophic defeat for Castile and the Order of Calatrava, whose Grand Master died of wounds suffered in the battle.

== Background ==
The Granadan Sultan, Muhammad II, demanded the city of Tarifa back again from the Castilians. The Castilian king, Sancho, responded, saying that he recognized no right other than that of conquest and that in the case of claiming lost possessions, he demanded all the land of Granada. Angered, the Sultan entered Castilian territory, cutting down trees and capturing people. The border lord of Vera, Alazan Aben-Bucar, ravaged the province of Murcia with fifteen hundred horses, setting fields on fire and destroying vineyards. In retaliation, the Castilians seized Quesada and Alcaudete, along with other smaller fortresses in this region.

King Sancho died in April 1295, leaving his wife to act as regent during Ferdinand IV of Castile.

== Battle ==
In the same year, Rui Perez Ponce de Leon had gathered a brilliant host of knights of Calatrava and many vassals and entered the land of Jaen up to the vicinity of Granada. He took some towers and captured people and much loot. Conceited with these victories, he approached the plains without noticing that his flanks were attacked by the Granadans, reinforced every hour with armed villagers. The Granadan cavalry charged with vigor, attacked the Castilians near Iznalloz, and massacred the knights of the orders. All those from Calatrava died, thirty from Santiago, and the same Rui Perez received a stab wound, from which he died a few days later.

== Aftermath ==
The loss of this knight weakened the power of the ruling queen, who invoked the loyalty of Guzman el Bueno and earnestly asked him to defend Andalusia, threatened by the valiant king of Granada halos; however, Guzman would be defeated by the Granadans at the Battle of Arjona.

== See also ==
- Ruy Pérez Ponce de León
- Muhammad II of Granada
- Sancho IV of Castile
- Order of Calatrava

== Bibliography ==
- O'Callaghan, Joseph (2011). The Gibraltar Crusade: Castile and the Battle for the Strait. Philadelphia, PA: University of Pennsylvania Press. ISBN 9780812204636.
- Miguel Lafuente Alcántara (1852), Historia de Granada comprendiendo la de sus 4 provincias Almería, Jaen, Granada y Málaga desde remotos tiempos hasta nuestro días, Vol 1.
