= Castle of Alcañices =

Castle in Zamora, Spain

Castillo de Alcañices
- Alcañices in Spain
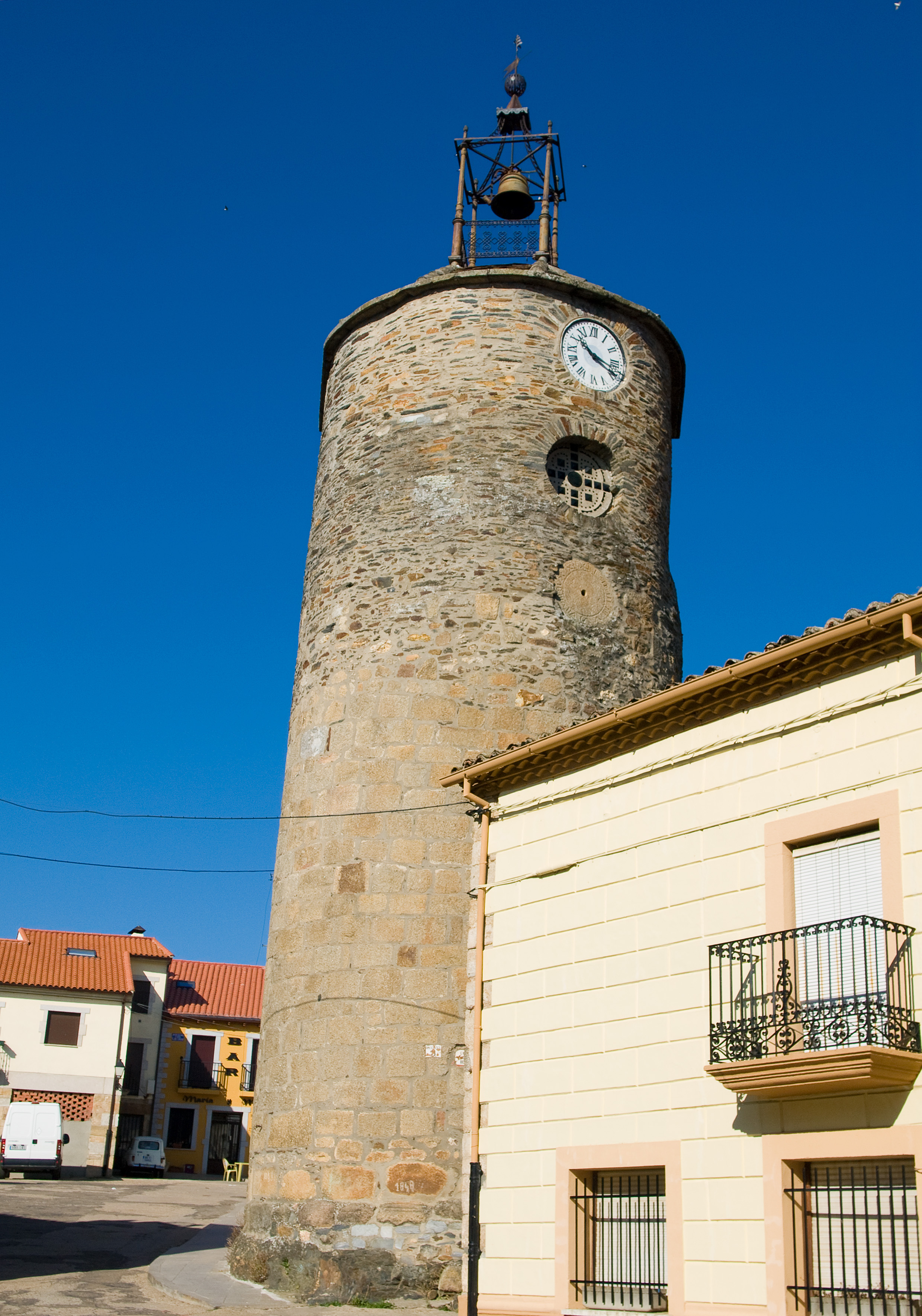
- Clock Tower of Alcañices, a part of the castle

Site information
- Type: Castle
- Open to the public: no

Site history
- Built: 1211

Garrison information
- Garrison: Templar Order
- Occupants: Alfonso IX of León

The castle of Alcañices is a castle located in Alcañices, Zamora, one of the four fortress located in the north of the Duero.

In 1210 it belonged to the Templar Order until its dissolution. The king Alfonso IX of León gave the castle to the templars in 1211, where there was celebrated the great victories of the order. Nowadays only ruins are preserved.
