= Pedro Alfonso de León =

Cross of the Order of Santiago.

Pedro Alfonso de León (c. 1196 – 1226) was a Leonese Spanish noble of the House of Burgundy. He was, according to many historians, the illegitimate son of Alfonso IX of León. He was elected Grand Master of the Order of Santiago in 1225, succeeding Fernán Pérez Chacín in the role.

== Biography ==
His exact date of birth is not known, but is estimated to be around 1196. There is also controversy amongst historians surrounding his true identity. Some chroniclers hold that he was the illegitimate son of Alfonso IX of León and an unknown woman, while others maintain that his mother was Aldonza Martínez de Silva, daughter of Martín Gómez de Silva and his wife Urraca Ruiz de Cabrera. Still other historians have cast doubt on Pedro Alfonso's status as Alfonso IX's illegitimate son, that he existed at all or that he was a Grand Master of the Order of Santiago. (Note: "...for Rades [Francisco de Rades y Andrada], in the space of time corresponding to the government of Fernando Pérez Chacín, there were really two Grand Masters: [Fernando Pérez Chacín), who died or was removed a year after his election, and Pedro Alfonso, elected in 1225 who died a year later. For [Derek William] Lomax, there was only one Grand Master in this short period of time: Fernando Pérez Chacín. In fact, documentation proves that this historian is right, rather than the chronicler who mentioned a non-existent Grand Master, supposedly an illegitimate son of King Alfonso IX" (loose translation)'"`UNIQ--ref-00000001-QINU`"')

== Marriage and descendancy ==
The name of his wife is not known, and historians disagree over whether Pedro Alfonso had one or two children. His children were as follows.

- Diego Alfonso de León. Married Urraca de Tenorio, Lady of Tenorio and Cotovad.
- Alfonso Pérez de León (born c. 1215 – d. ?). Navarrese noble from Monreal. Married Inés Gutiérrez de Páramo.

== See also ==
- Order of Santiago

== Bibliography ==
- Ayala Martínez, Carlos de (1997). "Las órdenes militares en el siglo XII castellano. La consolidación de los maestrazgos". Anuario de Estudios Medievales (in Spanish). No. 27. Consejo Superior de Investigaciones Científicas, CSIC: Institución Milá y Fontanals. ISSN 0066-5061.
- Morales y Roca, Francisco José (1971). "La Casa y Linaje de Godoy del Reino de Galicia". Hidalguía: La revista de genealogía, nobleza y armas (in Spanish). No. 109. Madrid. pp. 785–850.
- Salazar y Castro, Luis de (1685). Historia Genealógica de la Casa de Silva (in Spanish). Vol. 1st Part. Melchor Álvarez y Mateo de Llanos. OCLC 832016336.

Preceded by Fernán Pérez Chacín	Grand Master of the Order of Santiago; 1225–1226	Succeeded by Pedro González Mengo
