= Aldonza Alfonso de León =

Illegitimate daughter of King Alfonso IX of León

Aldonza Alfonso de León (c. 1215–1266) was an illegitimate daughter of King Alfonso IX of León and his mistress Aldonza Martínez de Silva.

== Biography ==
By birth, Aldonza was a woman of high standing. Consequently, Alfonso IX sought to arrange a prestigious marriage for her, that would ally her with an important lineage. Undoubtedly, the descendants of Ponce de Cabrera were a family of significant note. This advantageous match was secured by marrying Aldonza to Pedro Ponce de Cabrera.
Pedro Ponce served as "alférez" (standard-bearer) to King Alfonso IX and was a prominent figure in both his court and that of his successor, Ferdinand III. The marriage was significant, as it consolidated one of the most important noble lineages: the House of Ponce de León ,who adopted the lion on their coat of arms.

The couple had a large family, with the following children:

- Ferrán Pérez Ponce (died 1291), a great 13th-century nobleman and loyal friend to Alfonso X, who retained the trust of the crown under the reigns of Sancho IV and Ferdinand IV,
- Ruy Pérez Ponce (died 1295), Master of the Order of Calatrava in 1284, buried in the Monastery of Moreruela,
- Juan Pérez Ponce,
- Pedro Pérez Ponce,
- Elvira Pérez Ponce,
- Alvar Pérez Ponce,
- Juana Pérez Ponce.

Aldonza Alfonso de León was buried at the Monastery of Santa María de Nogales. Her tomb, that has since disappeared, was emblazoned with red lions on a silver field and featured four bishops in pontifical vestments at its head, with a row of small goats encircling the head end.
