= Sancha of Castile =

Sancha of Castile may refer to:

- Sancha of Castile, Queen of Navarre (c.1139-1179), daughter of King Alfonso VII of Castile and Queen Berenguela of Barcelona; wife of King Sancho VI of Navarre
- Sancha of Castile, Queen of Aragon (1154/5–1208), daughter of King Alfonso VII of Castile and Queen Richeza of Poland; wife of King Alfonso II of Aragon

== See also ==
- Sancha of León (disambiguation)
- Infanta Sancha (disambiguation)
- Queen Sancha (disambiguation)
