= Mayordomo mayor del Rey =

The Mayordomo mayor del Rey (or High Steward to the King) was a title held in the former Kingdoms of León and Castile. This position was always held by members of the high nobility or even royalty. With the accession of Charles V to the throne in 1516, it was replaced by the title of Mayordomo mayor of the King of Spain (High Steward to the King of Spain).

== Functions ==
The Mayordomo mayor del Rey was :

- Head of the Royal Household, not only honorarily but also effectively.
- In charge of court ceremonies and palace etiquette.
- Administrator of the royal patrimony, although this function gradually lost importance over the centuries in favor of other minor court officials.

== Requirements for holding the office ==
The requirements for holding the office of Mayordomo mayor del Rey and its functions are listed in Part II, Title IX, Law XVII of the Siete Partidas:

- Be of good lineage, as this, according to the mentality of the time, would encourage one to do good.
- Be knowledgeable about the King's revenues and rights in order to manage and increase those revenues.
- Be able to keep the accounts of the Royal Household in order to report to the King on the state of the accounts.
- Be loyal to the King in order to gain the friendship of his subjects, since everything concerning the Royal Household fell under his jurisdiction.

== Mayordomo Mayor of the King of León (1156-1230) ==
- Vela Gutiérrez (1156-1157)
- Count Ponce Giraldo de Cabrera (1157)
- Abril (1158-1159)
- Pedro Arlote (1159)
- Count Ponce Giraldo de Cabrera (1159-1162), second term
- Pedro Balzán (1162).
- Fernando Rodríguez de Castro, House of Castro (1162-1164)
- Count Gómez González de Manzanedo (1164-1165)
- Fernando Rodríguez de Castro, House of Castro (1165-1166), second term
- Pedro Arias de Limia (1166-1167)
- Count Ponce de Minerva (1167)
- Ermengol VII, Count of Urgel (1167-1173)
- Álvaro Rodríguez de Castro, son of Rodrigo Fernández de Castro (1173-1174)
- Ermengol VII, Count of Urgel (1175), second term
- Gonzalo Osorio, Lord of Villalobos, son of Count Osorio Martínez and Countess Teresa Fernández.
- Ermengol VII, Count of Urgel (1179-1184), third term
- Pedro Rodríguez de Castro, son of Rodrigo Fernández de Castro (1184)
- Rodrigo López de Haro, son of Lope Díaz I de Haro, Lord of Vizcaya (1184-1185)
- Count Pedro Manrique de Lara, Viscount of Narbonne and Lord of Molina (1185)
- Rodrigo López de Haro (1185), second term
- Vermudo Álvarez, son of Count Álvaro Rodríguez de Sarria and Countess Sancha Fernández de Traba.
- Munio Fernández de Rodeiro (1188)
- Pedro Vélaz (1188), son of Count Vela Gutiérrez, and Archdeacon of the Santiago de Compostela Cathedral and Abbot of the Monastery of Santa María de Oseira.
- Pedro García de Aza, Tenant-in-chief of Lerma, grandson of Count García Ordóñez(1188)
- Count Fernando Ponce (1189), son of Ponce de Minerva
- García Rodríguez de Sanabria (1190-1191)
- Pedro Fernández de Castro el Castellano, House of Castro (1191)
- Juan Fernández de Limia, son of Fernando Arias and Teresa Bermúdez de Traba (1192-1193)
- Count Gómez González de Traba (1193), son of Count Gonzalo Fernández de Traba and grandson of Fernando Pérez de Traba.
- Pedro Fernández de Castro el Castellano (1194), second term
- Juan Fernández de Limia (1194), second term
- Fernando García de Villamayor (1194-1195)
- Pedro Fernández de Castro el Castellano, House of Castro (1195-1196), third term
- García Pérez de Braganza (1196)
- Pedro Fernández de Castro el Castellano, House of Castro (1196-1197), fourth term
- Pelayo Muñoz (1197)
- Fernando García de Villamayor (1197-1203), second term
- Gonzalo Rodríguez Girón (1203)
- Juan Fernández de Limia (1204), third term
- Pedro Fernández de Castro el Castellano, House of Castro (1204), fifth term
- Lorenzo Suárez de Valladares (1205)
- Rodrigo Ordóñez, merino mayor of León (1210-1211)
- Álvaro Gutiérrez de Castro, third son of Gutierre Rodríguez de Castro (1211-1213)
- Pedro Gutiérrez de Castro, fourth son of Gutierre Rodríguez de Castro (1213)
- Pedro, Master of the Knights Templar (1214)
- Álvaro Núñez de Lara, son of Count Nuño Pérez de Lara (1217-1218)
- Lorenzo Suárez de Valladares (1219)
- Fernando Fernández de Braganza (1219-1222), son of Fernando Ponce de Cabrera el Menor
- Álvaro Pérez de Castro el Castellano, señor de la Casa de Castro (1223)
- Peter I of Urgell, son of King Sancho I of Portugal (1223-1230)

== Mayordomo Mayor of the King of Castile, and from 1230 also of the King of León ==
- Martín Muñoz (1149-1152)
- Gutierre Fernández de Castro (1153-1155)
- Fernando Pérez Hurtado, illegitimate son of Queen Urraca I and Count Pedro González de Lara (1155-1156)
- Count Gómez González de Manzanedo (1157-1158)
- Pedro García de Lerma (1161-1172)
- Count Ponce de Minerva (1172-1173)
- Count Gómez González de Manzanedo (1173), second term
- Rodrigo Gutiérrez Girón (1173-1193)
- Pedro Rodríguez de Guzmán (1194-1195), son of Rodrigo Muñoz de Guzmán and Mayor Díaz.
- Pedro García de Lerma (1195-1198), second term
- Gonzalo Rodríguez Girón (1198-1216)
- Martín Muñoz de Hinojosa (1217)
- Gonzalo Rodríguez Girón (1217-1231), second term
- García Fernández de Villamayor (1232-1238)
- Rodrigo González Girón, son of Gonzalo Rodríguez Girón (1238-1252)
- Juan García de Villamayor, son of García Fernández de Villamayor (1252-1260)
- Fernando de la Cerda, infante de Castilla and son of Alfonso X el Sabio (1260)
- Alfonso García de Villamayor, son of García Fernández de Villamayor (1262)
- Fernando de la Cerda (1270-1272), second term
- Gil García de Azagra (1272)
- Fernando de la Cerda (1274), third term
- Sancho of Castile, infante de Castilla and son of Alfonso X el Sabio (c. 1276-1277)
- Manuel of Castile, infante de Castilla and son of Ferdinand III of Castile (1278-1282)
- Alfonso Fernández, son of infante Philip of Castile and grandson of Ferdinand III of Castile (1283)
- Fernán Pérez Ponce de León, Adelantado mayor of Andalusia and grandson of King Alfonso IX of León (1284)
- Juan de Castilla el de Tarifa, infante de Castilla and son of Alfonso X el Sabio (1284-1285)
- Pedro Álvarez de las Asturias, Lord of Noreña (1285-1286)
- Lope Díaz III de Haro, Lord of Biscay (1286-1288)
- Juan Fernández Cabellos de Oro, Adelantado mayor of Andalusia and grandson of King Alfonso IX de León (1288-1292)
- Ruy Pérez Ponce de León, Master of the Order of Calatrava and grandson of King Alfonso IX de León (1293-1295)
- Pedro Ponce de León, Adelantado mayor of Andalusia and great-grandson of King Alfonso IX de León (1295)
- Rodrigo Rodríguez Carrillo (1296)
- Don Juan Manuel, Lord of Villena (1297)
- Juan Osórez, Master of the Order of Santiago (1298-1302)
- Juan Núñez II de Lara, Lord of the House of Lara (1302)
- Henry of Castile the Senator, infante de Castilla and son of Fernando III el Santo (1302)
- Pedro Ponce de León (1302-1305), second term
- Juan Núñez II de Lara (1307), second term
- Diego López V de Haro, Lord of Biscay and great-grandson of King Alfonso IX of León (1307-1309)
- Juan Núñez II de Lara (1308), third term
- Pedro de Castilla, infante de Castilla and son of Sancho IV el Bravo (1310-1311)
- Don Juan Manuel, grandson of Fernando III el Santo (1311-1314)
- Juan Núñez II de Lara (1315), fourth term
- Alfonso de Valencia, Pertiguero mayor of Santiago and grandson of Alfonso X el Sabio (1315-1316)
- Don Juan Manuel (1318-1319), second term
- Fernando de la Cerda, grandson of Alfonso X el Sabio (1320)
- Felipe de Castilla, infante de Castilla and son of Sancho IV el Bravo (1325-1327)
- Álvar Núñez Osorio, Count of Trastámara, Lemos and Sarria (1328)
- Fernando Rodríguez de Valbuena, prior of the Knights Hospitaller (1328-1332)
- Pedro Fernández de Castro, grandson of Sancho IV de Castilla (1332-1342)
- Juan Núñez III de Lara, señor de Lara and great-grandson of Alfonso X el Sabio (1345-1350)
- Nuño Díaz de Haro, señor de Lara y Vizcaya and great-great-grandson of Alfonso X el Sabio (1351)
- Fernán Ruiz de Castro, great-grandson of Sancho IV el Bravo (1351-1355)
- Juan Fernández de Hinestrosa (1355)
- Diego García de Padilla, Master of the Order of Calatrava (1357-1363)
- Martín López de Córdoba, Master of the Order of Alcántara (1365-1368)
- Alvar García de Albornoz, Lord of Albornoz (1369-1374)
- Juan Martínez de Luna III, Lord of Gotor and Illueca (c. 1374)
- Pedro González de Mendoza, Lord of Hita and Buitrago (1379-1385)
- Diego Hurtado de Mendoza, Admiral of Castile, Lord of Hita and Buitrago (1385-1389)
- Juan Hurtado de Mendoza el Limpio, Lord of Almazán, Morón and Gormaz (1391-1419)
- Juan Hurtado de Mendoza y Castilla, son of the previous, Lord of Morón and Gormaz (1419-1426)
- Ruy Díaz de Mendoza, son of the previous, Count of Castrojeriz and Lord of Morón (1426-1454)
- Juan Pacheco, Marquess of Villena and Grand Master of the Order of Santiago (1454-1472)
- Diego López Pacheco y Portocarrero, marqués de Villena and Grand Master of the Order of Santiago (1472-1480)
- Juan Chacón de Alvarnéz, Lord of Albox, Alborea, Oria, María, Benitagla and Albanchez (1480-1503)

== Sources ==
- Salazar y Acha, Jaime de (2000). La casa del Rey de Castilla y León en la Edad Media (PDF). Madrid: Centro de Estudios Políticos y Constitucionales. ISBN 978-84-259-1128-6.
- Carriazo Rubio, Juan Luis (2002). La memoria del linaje: Los Ponce de León y sus antepasados a fines de la Edad Media. Sevilla: Universidad de Sevilla, Secretariado de Publicaciones. ISBN 84-472-0723-4.
- Loaysa, Jofré de; García Martínez, Antonio (1982). Crónicas de los Reyes de Castilla Fernando III, Alfonso X, Sancho IV y Fernando IV (1248-1305). latín y castellano. Murcia: Academia Alfonso X el Sabio, Colección Biblioteca Murciana de bolsillo Nº 27. ISBN 84-00-05017-7.
- Menéndez Pidal de Navascués, Faustino (1982). Heráldica medieval española. Volumen I: La Casa Real de Castilla y León. Hidalguía, Instituto Luis de Salazar y Castro. ISBN 8400051505.
