= Ruy Pérez Ponce de León =

Cross of the Order of Calatrava.

Ruy Pérez Ponce de León or Rodrigo Pérez Ponce de León (b. ? - d. 1295) was a Spanish noble of the House of Ponce de León, in the service of the Kingdom of Castile. He was the 15th Grand Master of the Order of Calatrava from 1284 to 1295 under King Sancho IV of Castile and further served as Mayordomo Mayor del Rey from 1293 - 1295, also under Sancho IV.

== Family origins ==
Ruy was the son of the Count of Cabrera, Pedro Ponce de Cabrera and his wife, Aldonza Alfonso de León, one of the illegitimate daughters of Alfonso IX of Leon and Aldonza Martínez de Silva. One of his brothers was Fernán Pérez Ponce de León.

== Biography ==
Prior to his election to grand master, he was the Comendador militar of Alcañiz for the Order of Calatrava. He was elected to grand master in 1284, succeeding Juan González (served 1267–1284). After the death of his brother, Fernán Pérez in 1292, the king, Sancho IV of Castile charged Ruy Perez with the guardianship of his son, the future King Ferdinand IV of Castile, a charge that had previously been under the charge of his late brother.

Later in 1292, Ruy was in the vicinity of Tarifa with King Sancho IV. He was there given eventual lordship over the city after its conquest from the Moors.

Ruy died in 1295, two days after being injured in the Battle of Iznalloz against the forces of the Kingdom of Granada under Muhammad II, in a small town of the same name north of Granada.

Preceded by Juan González	Grand Master of the Order of Calatrava; 1284–1295	Succeeded by Diego López de Santsoles
Preceded by Juan Fernández "Cabellos de Oro"	Mayordomo mayor del Rey; 1293–1295	Succeeded by Pedro Ponce de León y Meneses

== See also ==
- Order of Calatrava
- List of grand masters of the Order of Calatrava
