= Aldonza Martínez de Silva =

Portuguese noblewoman, mistress of King Alfonso IX of León

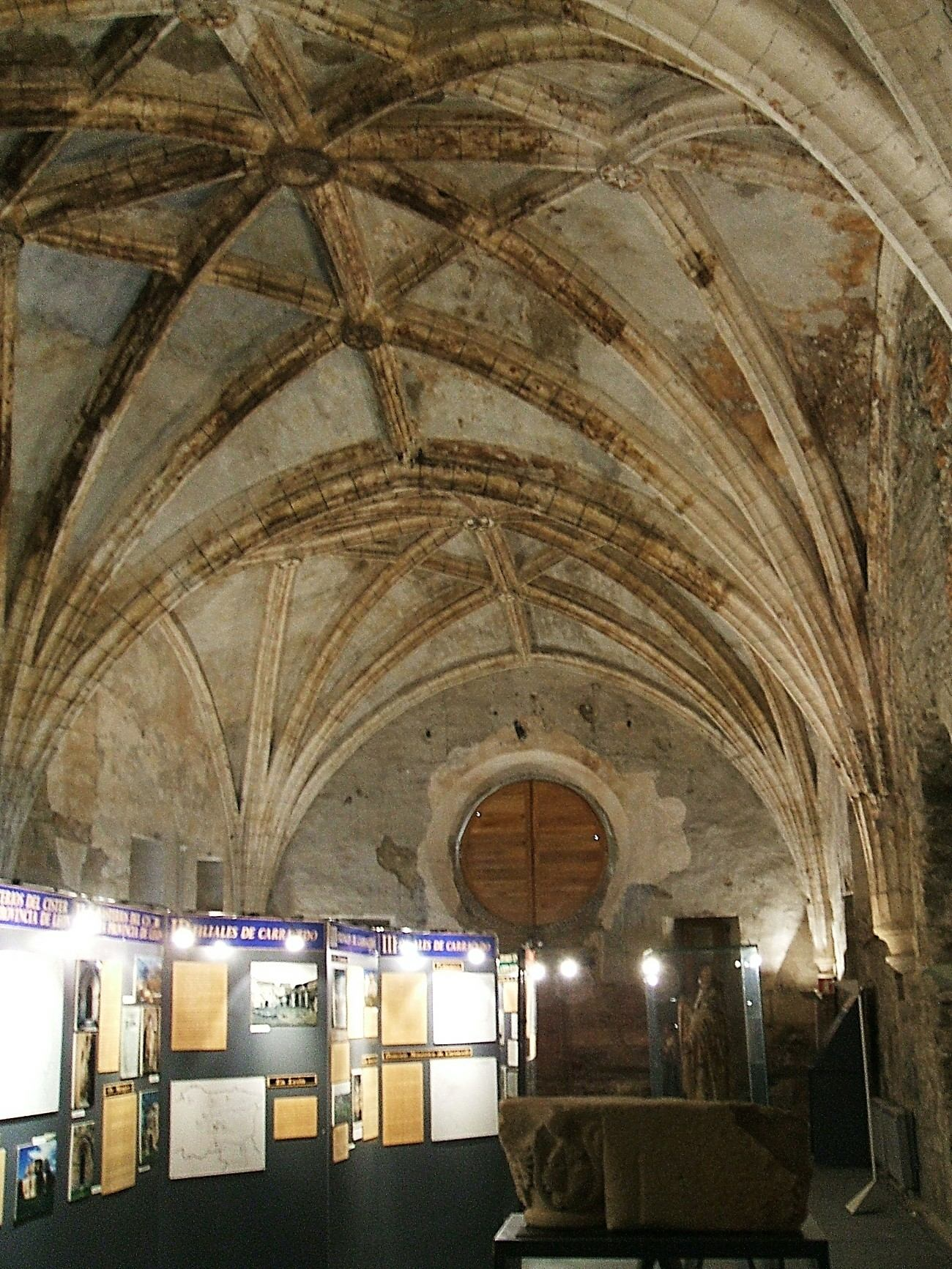
Refectory of the Monastery of Carracedo, of which Aldonza was a patron.

Aldonza Martínez de Silva (Portuguese: Aldonça Martins da Silva; died after 1236) a Portuguese noblewoman, daughter of Martim Gomes da Silva and his wife Urraca Rodríguez, was one of the mistresses of King Alfonso IX of León and afterward, the wife of Diego Froilaz.

She probably arrived in the Kingdom of León in 1191 in the entourage of Infanta Theresa of Portugal for her wedding with King Alfonso IX. She had very influential relatives in the Kingdom of Portugal, including her aunt, Estefanía da Silva and her husband Martim Fernandes de Riba de Vizela, who were the tutors of the future King Sancho II of Portugal, and Estêvão Soares da Silva, the powerful Archbishop of Braga.

In 1214 she became the lover of Alfonso IX in a relationship that lasted until 1218 when the king became involved with Teresa Gil de Soverosa. Afterwards, she married Diego Froilaz, a marriage probably arranged by the king who gave the couple several properties in Pesquera and Villamarín. These estates were later claimed in 1230 by King Ferdinand III of León but were returned to Aldonza and her husband in 1232 when it was confirmed that these had been donated by King Alfonso to his former mistress.

She last appears in medieval charters in 1236 when, accompanied by her children, she donated several properties to the Monastery of Carracedo.

== Issue ==
Before her affair with King Alfonso IX, she had a son named Fernando Johannis, who, according to his patronymic, would have been the son of an individual named Juan (John), perhaps someone from Galicia or León who was a member of the royal court.

The children from her relationship with King Alfonso IX were:

- Rodrigo (ca. 1214 – ca. 1268), lord of Aliger and Castro del Río, and Adelantado of the March of Andalusia, he married Inés Rodríguez, daughter of Rodrigo Fernández de Valduerna, Lord of Cabrera and alférez of King Alfonso IX.
- Aldonza (died after 1267). Married Count Pedro Ponce de Cabrera, and had issue. They are the ancestors of the Ponce de León family.
- Teresa Alfonso of León, the wife of Count Nuño González de Lara el Bueno. (Note: There is controversy among historians and genealogists on her marriage to Nuño González de Lara el Bueno, lord of Lara. According to Pedro Afonso, Count of Barcelos, followed by other historians, Nuño's wife was this Teresa, daughter of King Alfonso IX and Aldonza Martínez de Silva. Luis de Salazar y Castro believed that her father was Pedro Alfonso de León, supposedly an illegitimate son of Alfonso IX. Spanish historian Julio González González argued that Nuño's wife could have been the daughter of Urraca Alfonso, illegitimate daughter of King Alfonso IX, and her husband Lope Díaz II de Haro. Szabolcs de Vajay rules out these last two filiations since her patronymic would have been Pérez or López rather than Alfonso and suggests that she could have been an illegitimate daughter of Alfonso of Molina. This filiation is suggested by a document dated 1243 where King Alfonso X of Castile reminds his friend and vassal, Count Nuño that he had "... begged and asked my father king Ferdinand to give you land and to make you a knight and give you in marriage donna Teresa Afonso, my cousin, granddaughter of the King of León". That is, that Teresa would be the cousin of King Alfonso X and granddaughter of Alfonso IX. In November 1254, however, in a document from the Monastery of Carracedo recording the sale made by Teresa of the village of Carracedo and its lake to the monastery, she declares that she is the daughter of King Alfonso IX and granddaughter of King Ferdinand II of León: "...pro anima dicti regis domini Alfonsi, patris mei,...domino Fernando bonae memoriae rege Legionis avo meo" ("...for the soul of the above-mentioned King Alfonso, my father,...Fernando of good remembrance, King of León, my grandfather") and also that the transaction is made with the approval of her husband Nuño ("cum asensu, et autoritate mariti mei domini Nunni Gundisalvi de Castella (de Lara)". Teresa is also mentioned by historian Mercedes Gaibrois de Ballesteros in her history of the reign of Sancho IV of Castile as the daughter of King Alfonso IX and aunt of Queen María de Molina since Teresa would be the half-sister of Alfonso of Molina, the queen's father.)

After 1218, she married Diego Froilaz, son of Count Froila Ramírez and his wife Sancha Fernández. They had the following children: (Note: The four children, Ramiro, Sancha, Estefanía and Urraca Díaz donated several properties in 1242 to the Monastery of Gradefes for the soul of their deceased father, Diego Froilaz.)

- Ramiro Díaz de Cifuentes (died after 1279), Lord of Asturias de Santillana, married Teresa Fernández de Lara, daughter of Fernando Álvarez de Lara and Teresa Rodríguez de Villalobos.
- Sancha Díaz de Cifuentes, the wife of Rodrigo Álvarez de Lara, an illegitimate son of Álvaro Núñez de Lara and Teresa Gil de Osorno.
- Estefanía Díaz
- Urraca Díaz

== Bibliography ==
- Alonso, Isabel (2002). "Desheredamiento y desafuero, o la pretendida justificación de una revuelta nobiliaria". Cahiers d'Études Hispaniques Médiévales (in Spanish). 25 (25): 99–129. doi:10.3406/cehm.2002.1233. hdl:10261/10864. ISSN 2108-7083.
- Calderón Medina, Inés (2011). "Las otras mujeres del rey: El concubinato regio en el reino de León (1157- 1230)". Seminário Medieval 2009–2011 (PDF) (in Spanish). Coordinators:Ferreira, María do Rosário; Laranjinha, Ana Sofia; Ribeiro Miranda, José Carlos. Oporto: Instituto de Filosofía da Faculdade de Letras da Universidade do Porto. pp. 255–289. ISBN 9789898459145. Archived from the original (PDF) on 2020-11-20.
- Gaibrois de Ballesteros, Mercedes (1922). Historia del reinado de Sancho IV de Castilla (in Spanish). OCLC 5332259.
- Martínez Martínez, Martín (1999). Cartulario de Santa María de Carracedo 1992 (in Spanish). Salamanca: Junta de Castilla y León, Consejería de Educación y Cultura. ISBN 84-7846-781-5.
- Salazar y Acha, Jaime de (1989). "Los descendientes del conde Ero Fernández, fundador del Monasterio de Santa María de Ferreira de Pallares". El Museo de Pontevedra (in Spanish). No. 43. pp. 67–86. ISSN 0210-7791.
- Sánchez de Mora, Antonio (2003). "La nobleza castellana en la plena Edad Media: el linaje de Lara. Tesis doctoral. Universidad de Sevilla" (in Spanish).
- Torres Sevilla-Quiñones de León, Margarita Cecilia (1999). Linajes nobiliarios de León y Castilla: Siglos IX-XIII (in Spanish). Salamanca: Junta de Castilla y León, Consejería de Educación y Cultura. ISBN 84-7846-781-5.
- Vajay, Szabolcs de (1989). Lindsay L. Brook (ed.). From Alfonso VII to Alfonso X, the first two centuries of the Burgundian dynasty in Castile and Leon - a prosopographical catalogue in social genealogy, 1100-1300. Studies in Genealogy and Family History in tribute to Charles Evans. Salt Lake City: Association for the Promotion of Scholarship in Genealogy, Ltd., Occasional Publication no. 2.
