= Monastery of Santa María de Nogales =

Cistercian monastery in Spain

Coordinates: 42.1489°N 5.9214°W

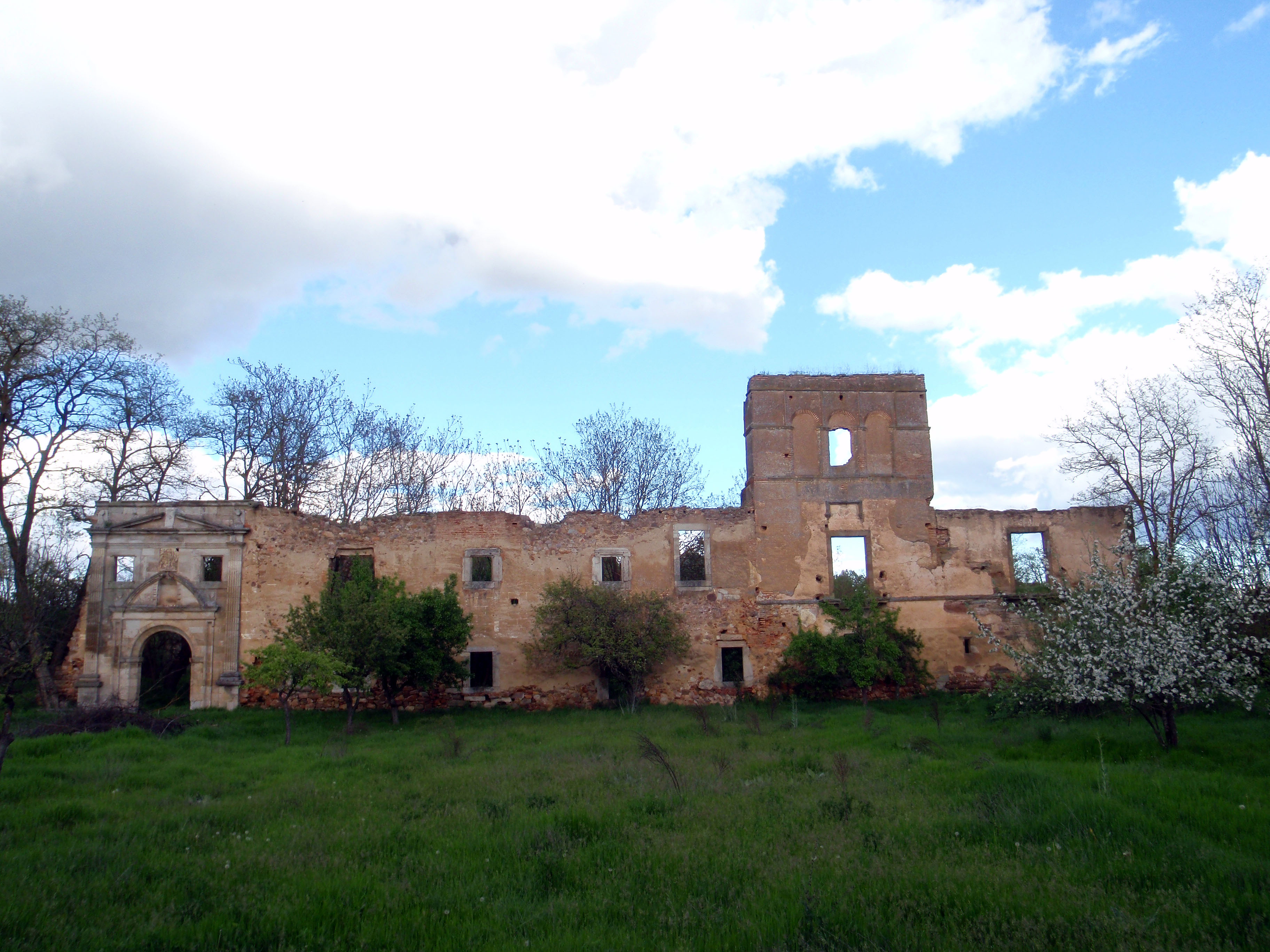
Ruins of the Santa María de Nogales Monastery

The monastery of Santa María de Nogales (Spanish: Monasterio de Santa María de Nogales) was a Cistercian monastery in Spain.

Its ruins still exist in the environs of San Esteban de Nogales.

Several important figures are buried there, including Sancha Ponce de Cabrera, Pedro Ponce de Cabrera and his wife Aldonza Alfonso de León.
