= House of Ponce de León =

Aristocratic family in León in Spain

Ponce de León
- Parent family: Castilian House of Ivrea (illegitimate)
- Founder: Pedro Ponce de Cabrera; Aldonza Alfonso de León
- Final head: Antonio Ponce de León, 11th Duke of Arcos
- Titles: Duke of Cádiz; Duke of Nájera; Duke of Arcos; Marquis of Cádiz; Marquis of Zahara; Marquis of Aguas Claras; Count of Casares; Count of Bailén; Count of Arcos; Count of Casa Ponce de León y Maroto; Lord of Marchena
- Cadet branches: House of Arcos (House of Bailén)

The House of Ponce de León was an important aristocratic family in León in Spain during the Middle Ages.

It arose from the marriage of Pedro Ponce de Cabrera and Aldonza Alfonso de León, illegitimate daughter of King Alfonso IX of Leon.

The house held several important titles in the peerage of Spain, including the dukedoms of Arcos, Aveyro, Cádiz and Nájera.

== Notable members ==
- Juan Ponce de León
- Juan Ponce de León II
- Juan Ponce de León y Loayza
- Luis Ponce de León
- Pedro Ponce de León the Elder
- Rodrigo Ponce de León, 4th Duke of Arcos
- Rodrigo Ponce de León, Duke of Cádiz
- Antonio Ponce de León, 11th Duke of Arcos

== Sources ==
- Salazar y Acha, Jaime de (1985). Una Familia de la Alta Edad Media: Los Velas y su Realidad Histórica (en Estudios Genealógicos y Heráldicos). Asociación Española de Estudios Genealógicos y Heráldicos. p. 52. ISBN 84-398-3591-4
