= Monastery of Santa María de Oseira =

Monastery in Galicia, Spain

Coordinates: 42°32′18″N 7°43′00″W

- Mosteiro de Santa María de Oseira
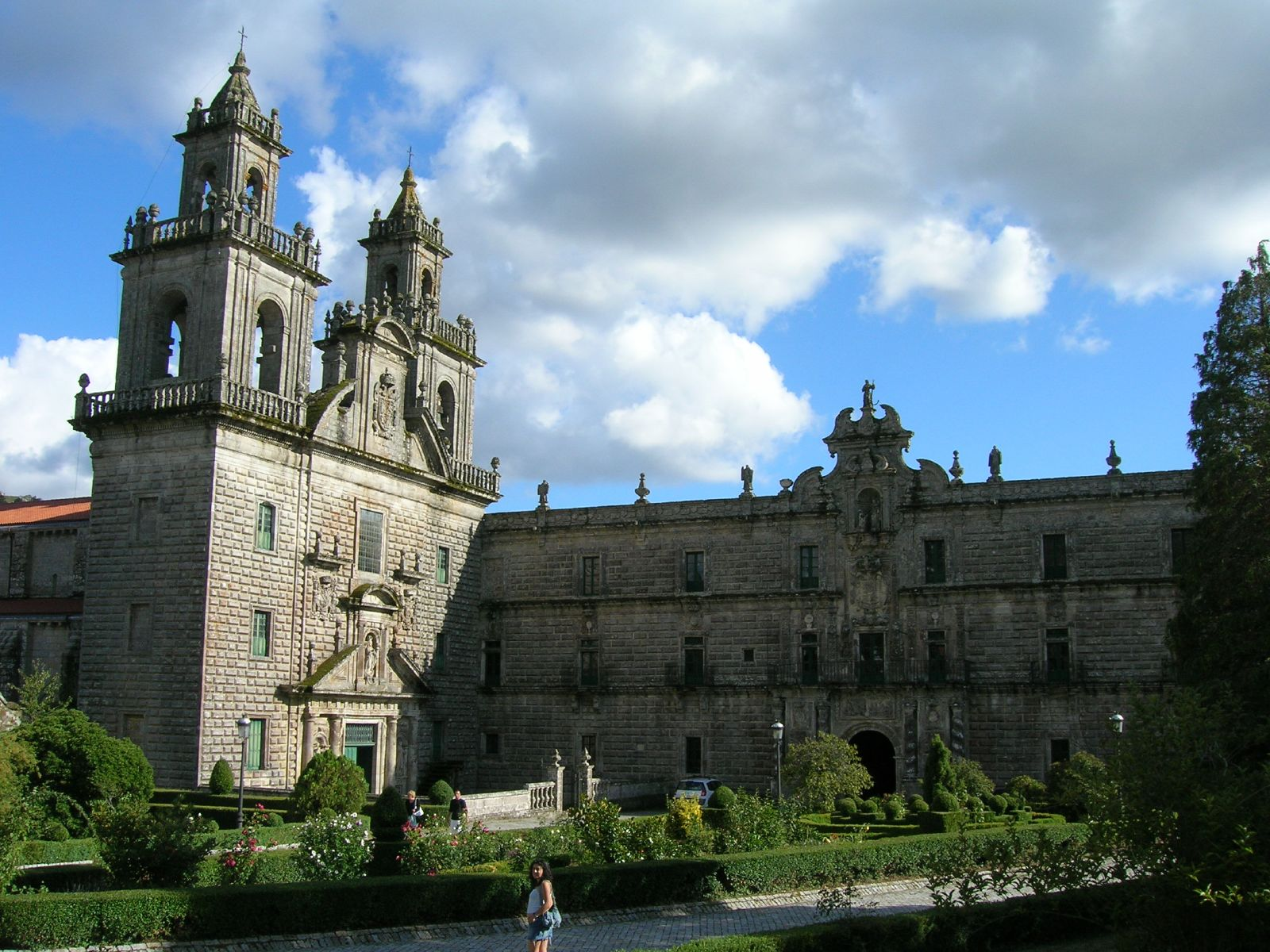

Religion
- Affiliation: Roman Catholic
- Ecclesiastical or organizational status: Monastery

Location
- Location: San Cristovo de Cea, Galicia, Spain
- Interactive map of Monastery of Santa María de Oseira

Architecture
- Style: Romanesque, Baroque
- Direction of façade: West

Website
- Official website

The monastery of Santa María de Oseira (Galician: Mosteiro de Santa María de Oseira; Spanish: Monasterio de Santa María la Real de Oseira) is a Trappist monastery in Galicia, Spain.

== History ==
In existence since 1137, it became a monastery of the Cistercian order in 1141, an order of French monks sent by Saint Bernard of Clairvaux. The monks left in 1835 forced to leave by the government policies, abandoning it. They returned in 1929, this time being a community of Cistercians of the Strict Reform - commonly called Trappists. The monastery is popular stopping point on the pilgrimage to Santiago de Compostela.

== Description ==
The church was built between c.1200 and c.1239 AD. It is considered a landmark of Romanesque architecture in the Spanish peninsula. Its design was inspired by other pilgrimage churches. The main chamber is known as the "palm tree room" and boasts a dome which is supported by four columns. It also possesses a Lapidarium: a collection of stone pieces obtained during the restorations and excavations. The buildings are in process of restoration by the state & monastic community. The monastery is a major state monument, and open to visitors.

== See also ==
- Pilgrimage to Santiago de Compostela
- Monasteries in Spain

== Bibliography ==
- MARTINEZ Romani, A Colección diplomática do mosteiro cisterciense de Santa Maria de Oseira (Ourense) I-II (1025-1310). III. (1310-1399), Xunta de Galicia, Santiago de Compostela, 1989–1993.
