= Sancha Alfonso of León =

Commander of the Order of Santiago (1220–1270)

The Venerable Sancha Alfonso of León OSJ
- Commander of the Order of Santiago
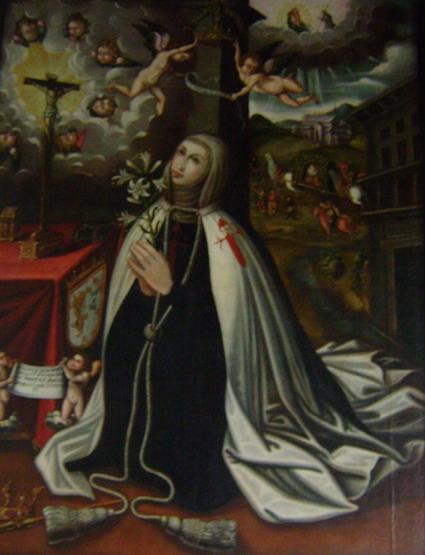
- Depiction of Sancha c. 17th-century

Personal details
- Born: 1220 Kingdom of León
- Died: 25 July 1270 (aged 49–50) Church of Santa Eufemia de Cozuelos
- Buried: Convento de Santa Fé
- Denomination: Roman Catholicism

Sainthood
- Feast day: 26 July

Doña Sancha Alfonso of León OSJ (c. 1220 – 25 July 1270) was a foundress of the Church of Santa Eufemia de Cozuelos, Olmos de Ojeda and a member of the Castilian House of Ivrea as the illegitimate daughter of King Alfonso IX of León and his mistress, Teresa Gil de Soverosa.

== Biography ==
Sancha was born in 1220, she was the first-born daughter of Alfonso IX of León and his long-term mistress, Teresa Gil de Soverosa, a member of the Portuguese nobility. She married Simón Ruiz de los Cameros, as arranged by Alfonso X of Castile, furthermore, many historians however question and debate the authenticity of the document.

In 1269, Sancha donated her assets to help fund the Order of Santiago. On 21 February 1270, she professed as a nun at the Church of Santa Eufemia de Cozuelos, Olmos de Ojeda until her death on 25 July 1270.

On 25 July 1270, Sancha Alfonso died at the Church of Saint Eufemia of Cozuelos. After her death, with the approval of Philip III of Spain they began to begin the process necessary for beatification. Despite this, she has not yet been declared 'Blessed' and holds the title of venerable.

== Bibliography ==
- Calderón Medina, Inés (2011). "Las otras mujeres del rey: El concubinato regio en el reino de León (1157–1230)" (PDF). Seminário Medieval 2009–2011 (in Spanish). Coordinators:Ferreira, María do Rosário; Laranjinha, Ana Sofia; Ribeiro Miranda, José Carlos. Oporto: Instituto de Filosofía da Faculdade de Letras da Universidade do Porto. pp. 255–289. ISBN 9789898459145. Archived from the original (PDF) on 2020-11-20.
- Reinares Martínez, Ernesto (1990). Apuntes para la historia de San Román y su tierra en el Cameros Viejo. Berceo.
