= Rodrigo Gutiérrez Girón =

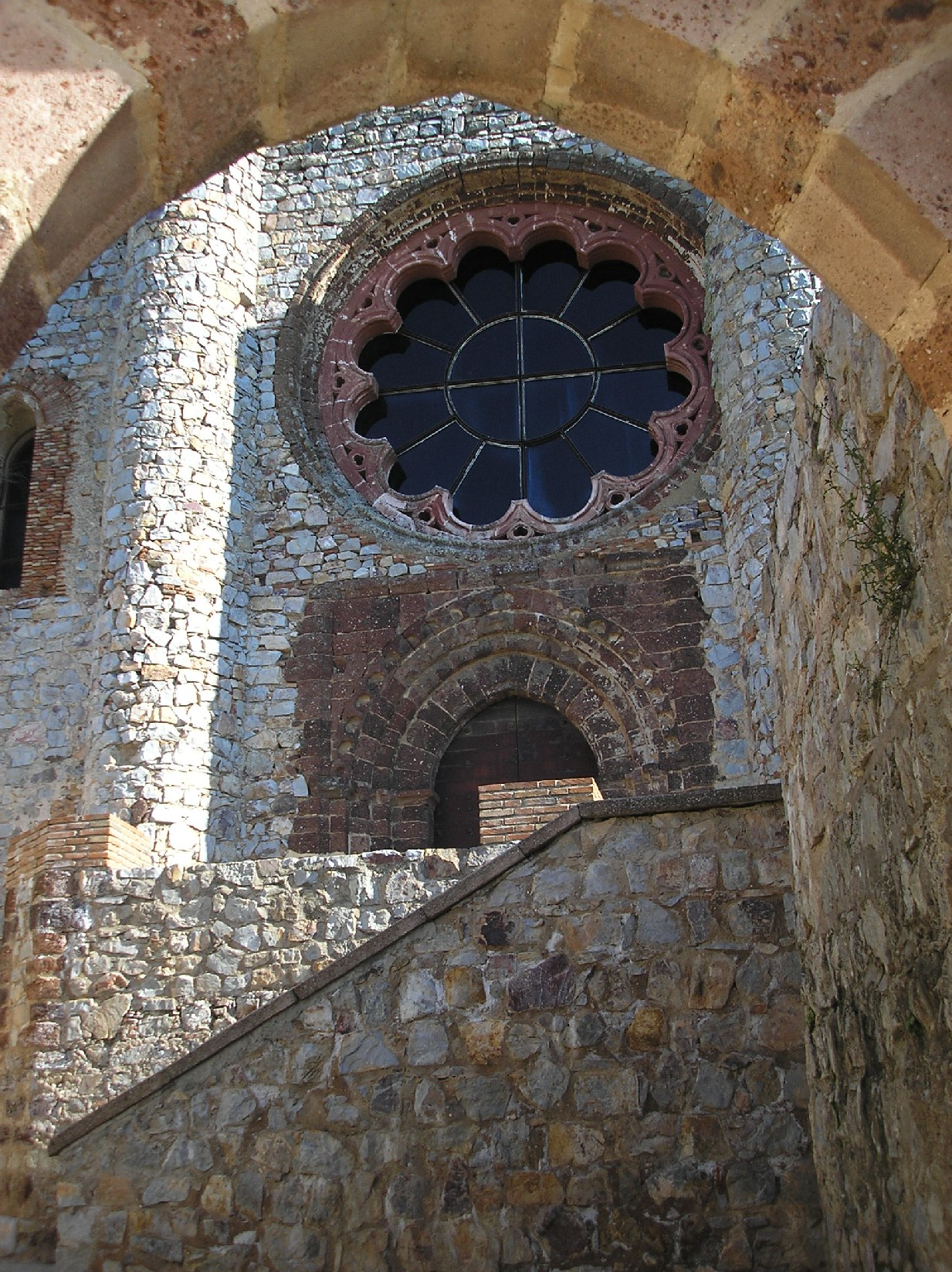
Calatrava Castle, formerly known as Dueñas Castle

Rodrigo Gutiérrez Girón (died 1193) was a magnate and ricohombre from Palencia who played a key role in the Medieval history of the Iberian Peninsula. He was the first one of his lineage to add Girón to his patronymic. (Note: As reflected in Charter XXI of the Cartulary of the Monastery of San Salvador de El Moral in Palencia and mentioned by Estepa Díaz (op cit) when he confirms a document on July 19, 1166 as Rodrigo Girón in Monzón. Cfr. Estepa Díez (2003), p. 289) Owner of vast holdings and estates, Rodrigo and his relatives formed one of the most powerful clans in Tierra de Campos since the time of the Banu Gómez.

== Biography ==
Mayordomo mayor of King Alfonso VIII of Castile between 1173 and 1193, except for short intervals, he and his descendants were part of one of the most powerful families in the medieval Kingdoms of Castile and León and played a relevant role in the definitive unification of the crowns of both kingdoms. He participated in several major battles during the Reconquista in southern Spain.

Rodrigo governed several feudal estates, including Gatón de Campos, Monzón, Torremormojón, Montealegre, half of Carrión and Liébana, all of which, except the last one, were situated in Tierra de Campos. For his loyalty and services to the crown, he was generously rewarded. In 1179 King Alfonso VIII granted him Borox and allowed him to build public baths and ovens in Toledo as well as a watermill at the Tagus River.

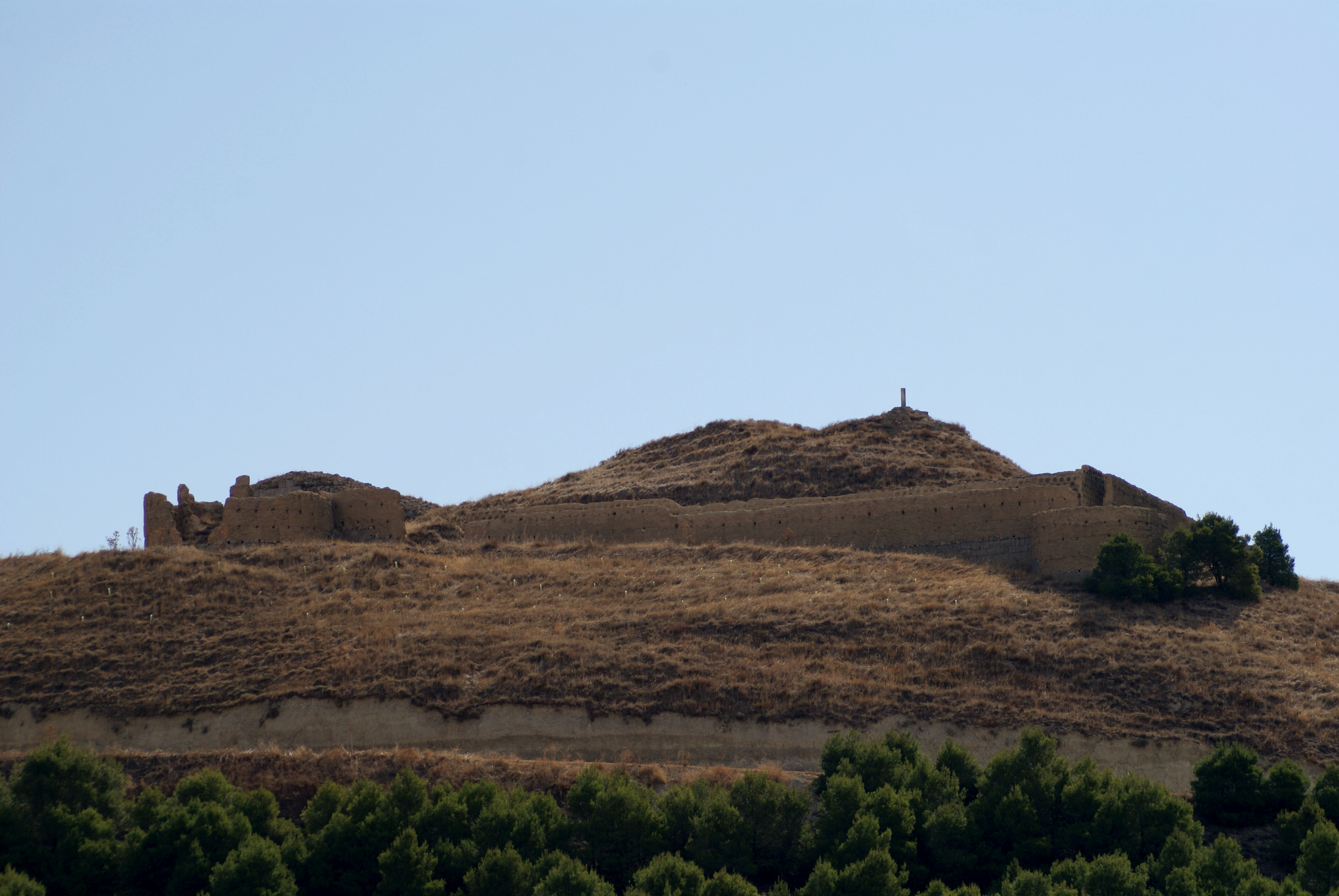
Ruins of the castle in Torremormojón

In 1189 he was governing Higares Castle in Mocejón and the surrounding lands which he gave that year to the bishop and Cathedral of Toledo. In 1191, Rodrigo and his second wife, Jimena, donated "for their souls" half of the income and properties at Dueñas Castle in the province of Ciudad Real, to the Order of Calatrava, leaving the other half for the offspring of his first marriage. In this donation, the couple also included half of Borox, Mocejón, plus the ovens and watermill in Toledo.

Rodrigo died in 1193 and received burial at Palencia Cathedral.

== Ancestry ==
The origin of the Girón lineage has been subject to much debate by historians and genealogists. Jerónimo Gudiel was the first one to write a complete treatise on this family, commissioned by the first Duke of Osuna, Pedro Téllez-Girón, a work which was published in 1577. According to the hagiographer of the Duke, the Girón came from Cisneros, Palencia and descended from Count Rodrigo González de Cisneros, a member of the House of Lara, following the genealogy previously proposed by Pedro Afonso, Count of Barcelos. Luis de Salazar y Castro in his work on the Laras, also mistakenly attributed the origins of this family to Count Gonzalo Peláez, a powerful magnate from Asturias.

Analyzing medieval documentation and charters, modern historians have been able to clarify the origins of this important lineage from Tierra de Campos, possible descendants of the Banu Mirel and the Banu Gómez clans. According to these investigations, Rodrigo Gutiérrez Girón was the son of Gutierre Téllez and Urraca Díaz. (Note: King Alfonso VIII of Castile donates half the castle and villa of Aceca on 1 September 1166 to Gutierre Téllez. The document is one of the charters of the Order of Calatrava) His paternal grandfather was Tello Fernández, a nobleman from Saldaña who appears in 1116 as tenant-in-chief in Torremormojón and later, in 1127, holding the same post in Tierra de Campos, and governing the castle of Aceca where he died in 1133 when the castle was taken and destroyed by the Almoravids.

Rodrigo had four brothers Álvaro, Pedro Gutiérrez, married to María Bueso, Gonzalo, and Mayor, wife of Alfonso Téllez, son of Tello Téllez and Mayor Suárez. His brother Pedro, who appears in 1169 in the Monastery of San Isidro de Dueñas as the brother of Rodrigo Gutiérrez, was lord of half of Ocaña and, jointly with his kinsman, Tello Pérez de Meneses and their respective wives, founded a hospital for captives and pilgrims in Cuenca in 1182, donating it to the Order of Santiago two years later.

== Marriage and issue ==
His first marriage was with María de Guzmán, daughter of Rodrigo Muñoz de Guzmán and Mayor Díaz. Eight children were born of this marriage, as attested by a donation they made, after their father had died, in 1194 to the Order of Calatrava of their inheritance in Dueñas Castle. A nephew of these siblings also appears in the document, Rodrigo González Girón. (Note: In this document, Gutierre Roiz, Bishop of Segovia, and his siblings sold to the order the part that they had inherited in Dueñas Castle for 1000 maravedíes after the death of their father. This also confirms that Rodrigo Gutiérrez Girón did not die in 1195, as claimed by several authors. The children mentioned in this document are: Gonzalo; Gutierre; Álvaro; Pedro; Nuño; Rodrigo; Teresa; and Elvira, as well as nepote nostro Roderico Gonsalvi. Cfr. Ruiz Gómez (2003), pp. 150–151.) The offspring of this marriage were:

- Gonzalo Rodríguez Girón. Mayordomo mayor and lord of Frechilla and Autillo de Campos.
- Gutierre Rodríguez Girón, royal chancellor from 7 November 1182 to 22 August 1192, who confirmed charters during those years as Guterrio Roderici existente cancellario scripsit and Bishop of Segovia between 1194 and 1195, the year of his death at the Battle of Alarcos.
- Álvaro Rodríguez Girón, who appears in 1218 in the documentation of the Monastery of Santa María la Real in Aguilar de Campoo selling properties in Aguilar de Campoo and in Quintanilla de Verezoza.
- Pedro Rodríguez Girón, the husband of Sancha Pérez de Lumiares, daughter of Pedro Alfonso Viegas de Ribadouro and Urraca Alfonso, illegitimate daughter of King Afonso Henriques.
- Nuño Rodríguez Girón.
- Rodrigo Rodríguez Girón, royal chancellor and lord of the villa of Madrid.
- Teresa Rodríguez Girón, wife of Ponce Vela de Cabrera, alférez of King Ferdinand II of León, ancestors of the Ponce de León.
- Elvira Rodríguez Girón (died circa 1211), first wife of Alfonso Téllez de Meneses "el Viejo", grandparents of Mayor Alfonso de Meneses, the mother of Queen María de Molina.

Rodrigo Gutiérrez Girón married for the second time Jimena Osorio, daughter of Count Osorio Martínez. Both appear in the donation made on 22 November 1191 to the Order of Calatrava. Without issue from this marriage.

== The Coat of arms of the Girón ==
According to legend, an individual named Rodrigo González de Cisneros saved the life of King Alfonso VI of León in a battle against the Moors by giving his horse to the King so that he would be able to escape. He cut three pieces (jirones or girones, in Spanish) from the King's tunic and later asked the King to allow him to use these in his coat of arms.

This legend has no foundations and the events are not mentioned by historians or in popular tradition. Most importantly, the use of coats of arms was unknown at the time of King Alfonso VI and it was not until a century later that this custom became common.

== Bibliography ==
- Barón Faraldo, Andrés (2006). Grupos y dominios aristocráticos en la Tierrade Campos oriental, Siglos X-XIII (in Spanish). Palencia: Monografías. ISBN 84-8173-122-6.
- Cotarelo Mori, Emilio (July 1903). "Las armas de los Girones: Estudios de la antigua heráldica española" (PDF). Revista de Archivos, bibliotecas y museos (in Spanish). pp. 18–19, volume IX. OCLC 431825172.
- Estepa Díez, Carlos (2003). Las Behetrías Castellanas, 2 volumes (in Spanish). Valladolid: Junta de Castilla y León, Consejería de Cultura y Turismo. ISBN 84-9718-117-4.
- Gudiel, Jerónimo (1577). Compendio de algunas historias de España donde se tratan muchas antiguedades dignas de memoria y especialmente se da noticia de la antigua familia de los Girones y de otros muchos linajes (in Spanish). Alcalá de Henares: Casa de Juan Íñiguez de Lequerica. OCLC 638783752.
- Ruiz Gómez, Francisco (2003). Los orígenes de las órdenes militares y la repoblación de los territorios de La Mancha (1150-1250) (in Spanish). Consejo Superior de Investigaciones Científicas. ISBN 84-00-08159-5.
- Salazar y Acha, Jaime de (2000). La casa del Rey de Castilla y León en la Edad Media (in Spanish). Madrid: Centro de Estudios Políticos y Constitucionales. ISBN 84-259-1128-1.
- Salcedo Tapia, Modesto (1999). La familia Téllez de Meneses en los tronos de Castilla y Portugal (in Spanish). Palencia: Institución Tello Téllez de Meneses CECEL-CSIC y Diputación de Palencia, Departamento de Cultura. ISBN 848173-070-X.
- Sotto Mayor Pizarro, José Augusto de (1997). Linhagens Medievais Portuguesas: Genealogías e Estratégias (1279-1325) (in Portuguese). Oporto: author, doctorate thesis. hdl:10216/18023.
