= San Esteban de Nogales =

Coordinates: 42°10′N 5°56′W

San Esteban de Nogales, Spain
- municipality
- Flag Coat of arms
- Interactive map of San Esteban de Nogales, Spain
- Country: Spain
- Autonomous community: Castile and León
- Province: León
- Municipality: San Esteban de Nogales

Area
  - Total: 32 km^{2} (12 sq mi)

Population (2025-01-01)
  - Total: 239
  - Density: 7.5/km^{2} (19/sq mi)
- Time zone: UTC+1 (CET)
  - Summer (DST): UTC+2 (CEST)

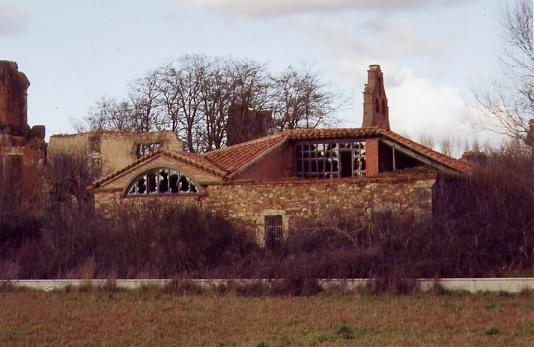
Ruins of the Monastery of Santa María de Nogales

San Esteban de Nogales is a municipality located in the province of León, Castile and León, Spain. According to the 2004 census (INE), the municipality has a population of 350 inhabitants.

The Cistercian Monastery of Santa María de Nogales is located in this municipal term. It was built in 1150 and abandoned in the 19th century.
