= Alfonso IX of León =

King of León and Galicia from 1188 to 1230

Alfonso IX
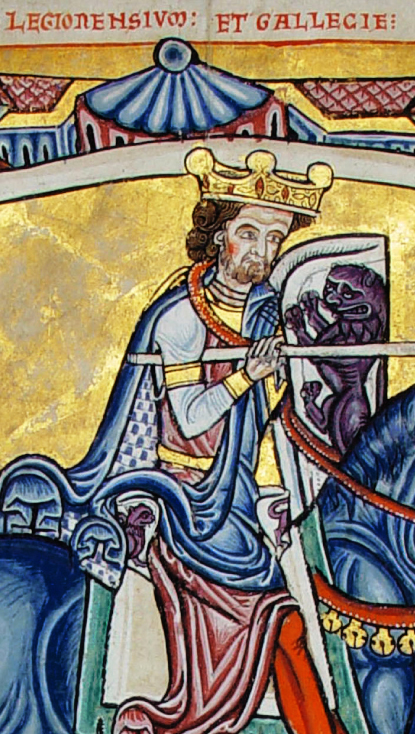
- Depiction on the Tumbo A cartulary of the Cathedral of Santiago de Compostela

King of León and Galicia
- Reign: 22 January 1188 – 24 September 1230
- Predecessor: Ferdinand II
- Successor: Sancha and Dulce (de jure); Ferdinand III (de facto)
- Born: 15 August 1171; Zamora
- Died: 23/24 September 1230 (aged 59); Villanueva de Sarria
- Burial: Cathedral of Santiago de Compostela
- Spouse: Theresa of Portugal (m. 1191; ann. 1196) Berengaria of Castile (m. 1197; ann. 1204)
- Issue among others...: Sancha, Queen of León; Ferdinand of León; Dulce, Queen of León; Ferdinand III, King of Castile; Alfonso, Lord of Molina; Berengaria, Latin Empress; Illegitimate: Rodrigo, Lord of Aliger; Aldonza of Léon; Sancha, Lady of Los Cameros; Martín of León
- House: Castilian House of Ivrea
- Father: Ferdinand II of León
- Mother: Urraca of Portugal

Alfonso IX (15 August 1171 – 23 or 24 September 1230) was King of León from the death of his father Ferdinand II in 1188 until his own death.

He took steps towards modernizing and democratizing his dominion and founded the University of Salamanca in 1218. In 1188 he summoned the first parliament reflecting the fullest representation of the citizenry ever seen in Western Europe, the Cortes of León.

Alfonso took part in the Reconquista, conquering several territories within Extremadura, capturing Mérida and Badajoz in 1230, which allowed for the eventual conquest of Seville during the reign of his son Ferdinand III. He was also involved in numerous conflicts with Pope Celestine III, being interdicted on account of the nature of his marriages.

== Biography ==
=== Early life ===
Alfonso was born in Zamora. He was the only son of King Ferdinand II of León and Urraca of Portugal. His father was the younger son of Alfonso VII of León and Castile, who divided his kingdoms between his sons, which set the stage for conflict in the family until the kingdoms were re-united by Alfonso IX's son Ferdinand III of Castile.

Alfonso IX had great difficulty in obtaining the throne through his given birthright. In July 1188 his cousin Alfonso VIII of Castile required the younger Alfonso to recognize the elder as overlord in exchange for recognizing the younger's authority in León.

=== Reign ===
The convening of the Cortes de León in the cloisters of the Basilica of San Isidoro would be one of the most important events of Alfonso's reign. The difficult economic situation at the beginning of his reign compelled Alfonso to raise taxes on the underprivileged classes, leading to protests and a few town revolts. In response, the king summoned the Cortes, an assembly of nobles, clergy and representatives of cities, and subsequently faced demands for compensatory spending and greater external control and oversight of royal expenditures. Alfonso's convening of the Cortes is considered by many historians, including John Keane, to be instrumental to the formation of democratic parliaments across Europe. Note that Iceland had already held what may have been what is Europe's first parliament, the Þingvellir, in 930. However, the Cortes' 1188 session predates the first session of the Parliament of England, which occurred in the thirteenth century.

In spite of the democratic precedent represented by the Cortes and the founding of the University of Salamanca, Alfonso is often chiefly remembered for the difficulties his successive marriages caused between him with Pope Celestine III. He was first married in 1191 to his first cousin, Theresa of Portugal, who bore him two daughters, and a son who died young. The marriage was declared null by the papal legate Cardinal Gregory for consanguinity.

After Alfonso VIII of Castile was defeated at the Battle of Alarcos, Alfonso IX invaded Castile with the aid of Muslim troops. He was summarily excommunicated by Pope Celestine III. In 1197, Alfonso IX married his first cousin once removed, Berengaria of Castile, to cement peace between León and Castile. For this second act of consanguinity, the king and the kingdom were placed under interdict by representatives of the pope. In 1198, Pope Innocent III declared Alfonso and Berengaria's marriage invalid, but they stayed together until 1204. The annulment of this marriage by the pope drove the younger Alfonso to again attack his cousin in 1204, but treaties made in 1205, 1207, and 1209 each forced him to concede further territories and rights. The treaty in 1207 is the first existing public document in the Castilian dialect.

The Pope was, however, compelled to modify his measures by the threat that, if the people could not obtain the services of religion, they would not support the clergy, and that heresy would spread. The king was left under interdict personally, but to that he showed himself indifferent, and he had the support of his clergy.

In 1211 Alfonso IX of León and Galicia gave the castle of Alcañices to the Templar Order, where inhabitants celebrated the great victories of the order.

Shield of Alfonso IX displayed in the Tumbo A manuscript of 12th century.

In 1218, Alfonso launched a crusade to capture Cáceres, but poor weather doomed it.

=== Death ===
Alfonso IX of León and Galicia died on 24 September 1230. His death was particularly significant in that his son, Ferdinand III of Castile, who was already the King of Castile, also inherited the thrones of León and Galicia from his father. This was thanks to the negotiations of his mother, Berengaria, who convinced her stepdaughters to renounce their claim on the throne. In an effort to consolidate his power over León quickly, Ferdinand III abandoned a military campaign to capture the city of Jaén immediately upon hearing news of his father's death and traveled to León to be crowned king. This coronation united the Kingdoms of León and Castile which would go on to dominate the Iberian Peninsula.

== Marriages and issue ==
Alfonso IX married twice, both times to near relatives, and remarkably, both of his marriages were annulled for consanguinity. Apart from the eight children born of these two marriages, Alfonso also fathered numerous progeny with women of lower rank.

=== Marriages and legitimate issue ===
In 1191, Alfonso married his first cousin, infanta Theresa of Portugal, who was his mother's brother's daughter. Theresa was the daughter of King Sancho I of Portugal and Queen Dulce of Aragon. The marriage was annulled five years later, on grounds of consanguinity but three children had been born by then, being:

- Sancha (1191 – before 1243) unmarried and without issue. She and her sister Dulce became nuns or retired to the monastery of San Guillermo Villabuena in León, where she died before 1243.
- Ferdinand (1192/1193 – 1214), unmarried and without issue.
- Dulce (1193/1194 – 1248).

On 17 November 1197, Alfonso IX married his first cousin once removed, infanta Berengaria of Castile. Berengaria was the daughter of King Alfonso VIII of Castile and his wife Queen Eleanor of England. Her paternal grandfather, Sancho III of Castile, had been a brother of Alfonso's own father Ferdinand II of León. Thus, both Alfonso IX and Berengaria belonged to the same dynasty or family. The marriage was annulled on grounds of consanguinity, but not before five children had been born, namely:

- Eleanor (1198 – 11 November 1202).
- Constance (died in 1242), became a nun at the Abbey of Santa María la Real de Las Huelgas, Burgos, where she died.
- Ferdinand III of Castile (1199/1201 (Note: King Fernando's year of birth is not recorded. According to the Chrónica latina de los reyes de Castilla, he was 16 years old when he became king of Castile in 1217 which would mean that he was born in 1201. Rodrigo Jiménez de Rada, a contemporary of Fernando, said that he was 18 years old in 1217 which would indicate that his birth was in 1199, two years after his parents' marriage.) – 1252). King of Castile in 1217 after the death of Henry I of Castile and of León in 1230 after the death of his father.
- Alfonso (died in 1272), Lord of Molina jure uxoris due to his first marriage to Mafalda González de Lara.
- Berengaria of León (died in 1237), in 1224 married John of Brienne.

=== Affairs and illegitimate issue ===
Alfonso also fathered many illegitimate children. After the annulment of his first marriage and before marrying for the second time, he had a relationship which lasted about two years with Inés Íñiguez de Mendoza, daughter of Iñigo López de Mendoza and María García. This affair produced a daughter born around 1197:

- Urraca Alfonso, the wife of Lope Díaz II de Haro, Lord of Biscay.

Alfonso had another relationship afterwards with a noblewoman from Galicia, Estefanía Pérez de Faiam. She was the daughter of Pedro Menéndez Faiam, who confirmed several royal charters of King Alfonso IX, and the granddaughter of Menendo Faiam, who also confirmed several diplomas issued in Galicia as of 1155 by King Ferdinand II of León. In 1211, Alfonso gave her lands in Orense where her family, as can be inferred from her last will dated 1250, owned many estates, as well as in the north of Portugal. After the relationship ended, Estefanía married Rodrigo Suárez with whom she had further issue. In her will, she asked to be buried in the Monastery of Fiães in northern Portugal. Alfonso IX and Estefanía were the parents of possibly two sons, but definitely of one, being: (Note: It is possible that, besides Ferdinand Alfonso, they also had another son, John Alfonso, who appears in several documents with the children that Estefanía had with her husband Rodrigo Suárez.)

- Ferdinand Alfonso of León (born in 1211), died young.

According to Spanish historian Julio González, after his relationship with Estefanía, the king had a lover from Salamanca, of unknown origin, whose name was Maura and with whom he had issue:

- Fernando Alfonso de León (c. 1214/1218 – Salamanca, 10 January 1278), archdeacon of the Cathedral of Santiago de Compostela, who had issue with Aldara de Ulloa.

Alfonso also had a relationship with a noblewoman from Portugal, Aldonza Martínez de Silva, daughter of Martim Gomes da Silva and his wife Urraca Rodrigues, which lasted from 1214 to 1218. Three children were born to them:

- Rodrigo (c. 1214 – c. 1268), lord of Aliger and Castro del Río, and Adelantado of the March of Andalusia, he married Inés Rodríguez, daughter of Rodrigo Fernández de Valduerna, Lord of Cabrera and alférez of King Alfonso IX.
- Aldonza (died after 1267). Married count Pedro Ponce de Cabrera, and had issue. They are the ancestors of the Ponce de León family.
- Teresa Alfonso of León, the wife of Nuño González de Lara el Bueno. (Note: There is controversy among historians and genealogists on her marriage to Nuño González de Lara. According to Pedro Afonso, Count of Barcelos, followed by other historians, Nuño's wife was this Teresa, daughter of King Alfonso IX and Aldonza Martínez de Silva. Luis de Salazar y Castro believed that her father was Pedro Alfonso de León, supposedly an illegitimate son of Alfonso IX. Spanish historian Julio González González argued that Nuño's wife could have been the daughter of Urraca Alfonso, illegitimate daughter of King Alfonso IX, and her husband Lope Díaz II de Haro. Szabolcs de Vajay rules out these last two filiations since her patronymic would have been Pérez or López rather than Alfonso and suggests that she could have been an illegitimate daughter of Alfonso of Molina. Nevertheless, Teresa confirms her filiation and marriage in a sale that she made in November 1254 in which she declares that she is the daughter of King Alfonso, granddaughter of King Fernando II of León and Galicia, and wife of Nuño González de Lara.)

Some families that arrive to Los Altos de Jalisco in Mexico like Gutierrez descend from the union of Alfonso with Aldonza Martínez de Silva

King Alfonso's most long-lasting extra-marital relationship, which began in 1218 and lasted until his death in 1230, was with Teresa Gil de Soverosa. A member of the Portuguese nobility, Teresa was the daughter of Gil Vasques de Soverosa and his first wife María Aires de Fornelos. They had four children, all of them born between 1218 and 1230:

- Sancha (d. 1270). Married Simon Ruiz, Lord of Cameros. She later became a nun at the convent of Santa Eufemia de Cozuelos which she had founded.
- María (died after July 1275). (Note: On 4 July 1275, María donated a fourth part of Lougares to the Monastery of Santa María de Melón (document published by the Real Academia Gallega).) Her first marriage was with Álvaro Fernández de Lara. She was then the concubine of her nephew King Alfonso X of Castile and, according to the Count of Barcelos, her second husband was Suero Arias de Valladares.
- Martín (died 1268/1272), married to Maria Mendes de Sousa, founders of the Monastery of Sancti-Spíritus, Salamanca. There was no issue from this marriage.
- Urraca (d. after 1252). First married García Romeu, and then Pedro Núñez de Guzmán.

Although Alfonso IX is supposed to have had another son, Pedro Alfonso de León, there is no documentary proof that he was the king's son or that he was the Grand Master of the Order of Santiago. (Note: "...for Rades [Francisco de Rades y Andrada], in the space of time corresponding to the government of Fernando Pérez Chacín, there were really two Grand Masters: Fernando Pérez Chacín, who died or was removed a year after his election, and Pedro Alfonso, elected in 1225 who died a year later. For [Derek William] Lomax, there was only one Grand Master in this short period of time: Fernando Pérez Chacín. In fact, documentation proves that this historian is right, rather than the chronicler who mentioned a non-existent Grand Master, supposedly an illegitimate son of King Alfonso IX" (loose translation))

== Bibliography ==
- Alonso, Isabel (2002). "Desheredamiento y desafuero, o la pretendida justificación de una revuelta nobiliaria". Cahiers d'Études Hispaniques Médiévales (in Spanish). No. 25. pp. 99–129. ISSN 2108-7083.
- Ayala Martínez, Carlos de (1997). "Las órdenes militares en el siglo XII castellano. La consolidación de los maestrazgos". Anuario de Estudios Medievales (in Spanish). No. 27. Consejo Superior de Investigaciones Científicas, CSIC: Institución Milá y Fontanals. ISSN 0066-5061.
- Calderón Medina, Inés (2011). "Las otras mujeres del rey: El concubinato regio en el reino de León (1157–1230)" (PDF). Seminário Medieval 2009–2011 (in Spanish). Coordinators:Ferreira, María do Rosário; Laranjinha, Ana Sofia; Ribeiro Miranda, José Carlos. Oporto: Instituto de Filosofía da Faculdade de Letras da Universidade do Porto. pp. 255–289. ISBN 9789898459145. Archived from the original (PDF) on 2020-11-20.
- Doubleday, Simon R. (2001). The Lara family: crown and nobility in medieval Spain. Harvard University Press. ISBN 978-0-674-03429-7.
- Echols, Anne; Williams, Marty (1992). An Annotated index of Medieval Women. Markus Weiner Publishing Inc. ISBN 978-0-910129-27-5.
- Fernandes Marques, Maria Alegría (2008). Estudos sobre a Ordem de Cister em Portugal (in Portuguese). Coímbra: Estudos da Faculdade de Letras da Universidade de Coimbra. ISBN 978-972-772-019-4.
- Flórez, Enrique (1761). Antonio Marín (ed.). Memorias de las Reynas Catholicas, historia genealógica de la Casa Real de Castilla, y de León, todos los infantes: Trages de las Reynas en estampas: y nuevo aspecto de la historia de España. Vol. I. Madrid. OCLC 220697158.
- Gerli, E. Michael; Armistead, Samuel G., eds. (2003). Medieval Iberia: an encyclopedia. Routledge. ISBN 978-0-415-93918-8.
- Lower, Michael (2014). "The Papacy and Christian Mercenaries of Thirteenth-Century North Africa". Speculum. 89 (3 JULY). The University of Chicago Press: 601–631. doi:10.1017/S0038713414000761. S2CID 154773840.
- Martínez Díez, Gonzalo (2007). Alfonso VIII, rey de Castilla y Toledo (1158–1214) (in Spanish). Gijón: Ediciones Trea, S.L. ISBN 978-84-9704-327-4.
- Martínez Martínez, Martín (1997). Cartulario de Santa María de Carracedo 992-1500 (in Spanish). Vol. I: 992-974. Ponferrada: Instituto de Estudios Bercianos. ISBN 84-88635-07-9.
- Moore, John Clare (2003). Pope Innocent III (1160/61-1216): To root up and to plant. Brill. ISBN 978-1-4237-1213-8.
- Reilly, Bernard F. (1993). The Medieval Spains. Cambridge University Press. ISBN 978-0-521-39436-9.
- Rodríguez López, Ana (2004). "Sucesión regia y legitimidad política en Castilla en los siglos XII y XIII. Algunas consideraciones sobre el relato de las crónicas latinas castellano-leonesas". Annexes des Cahiers de linguistique et de civilisation hispaniques médiévales (in Spanish). 16 (1): 21–41. doi:10.3406/cehm.2004.1312.
- Sánchez de Mora, Antonio (2004). "Nuño González de Lara: "El más poderoso omne que sennor ouiese e más honrado de Espanna"". Historia, instituciones, documentos (in Spanish). No. 31. Seville: University of Seville. ISSN 0210-7716.
- Shadis, Miriam (2010). Berenguela of Castile (1180–1246) and Political Women in the High Middle Ages. Palgrave Macmillan. ISBN 978-0-312-23473-7.
- Túy, Lucas (2003). Rey, Emma Falque (ed.). Chronicon mundi. Turnhout: Brepols. ISBN 9782503037417.
- Villegas-Aristizábal, Lucas (2018). "Did Savary of Mauléon Participate in Alfonso IX's Failed Siege of Cáceres in 1218?". De Medio Aevo. 6 (12): 99–118.
- Wright, Roger (2000). El tratado de Cabreros (1206): estudio sociofilológico de una reforma ortográfica. London: Queen Mary and Westfield College. ISBN 978-0-904188-59-2.

Alfonso IX of León Castilian House of Ivrea Cadet branch of the House of Ivrea Born: 15 August 1171 Died: 23/24 September 1230
Regnal titles
Preceded by Ferdinand II	King of León and Galicia; 1188–1230	Succeeded by Ferdinand III
