= San Fernando =

San Fernando may refer to:

== People ==
- Ferdinand III of Castile (c. 1200–1252), called San Fernando (Spanish) or Saint Ferdinand, King of Castile, León, and Galicia
- Eli San Fernando (born 1996), Filipino labor leader, politician and Internet personality

== Places ==
=== Argentina ===
- San Fernando de la Buena Vista, city of Greater Buenos Aires
- San Fernando, Catamarca
- San Fernando del Valle de Catamarca, capital of Catamarca province
- San Fernando Department, Chaco Province
- San Fernando Partido, Buenos Aires Province

=== El Salvador ===
- San Fernando, Chalatenango
- San Fernando, Morazán

=== Mexico ===
- San Fernando, Baja California, a Franciscan mission
- San Fernando, Chiapas
- San Fernando, Tamaulipas
- San Fernando de Rosas, name of Zaragoza, Coahuila, 1827–1868
- San Fernando River

=== Philippines ===
- San Fernando, Bukidnon
- San Fernando, Camarines Sur
- San Fernando, Cebu
- San Fernando, La Union, capital city of La Union
- San Fernando, Masbate
- San Fernando, Pampanga, capital city of Pampanga
  - San Fernando railway station (Pampanga)
- San Fernando, Romblon
- San Fernando, Santo Tomas, Batangas
- San Fernando, a barangay in Talisay, Negros Occidental

=== Spain ===
- Puerta de San Fernando (Seville), a gate of the walled enclosure of Seville
- Real Academia de Bellas Artes de San Fernando ("Royal Academy of Fine Art of San Fernando"), a museum and gallery
- San Fernando (Madrid Metro), a station on Line 7
- San Fernando (Málaga), a barrio of Málaga
- San Fernando, Spain, Province of Cádiz
- San Fernando de Henares, Madrid
- San Fernando de Maspalomas, Gran Canaria

=== United States ===
- San Antonio, founded as "San Fernando"
- San Fernando (VTA), a light rail station in San Jose, California
- San Fernando, Texas
- San Fernando Creek, Texas
- San Fernando Valley, California
  - San Fernando, California
  - San Fernando (Metrolink station)
  - San Fernando Line, railroad from San Fernando to downtown Los Angeles
  - San Fernando Road, a road that passes through San Fernando and the San Fernando Valley

=== Venezuela ===
- San Fernando de Apure, Apure
- San Fernando de Atabapo, Amazonas

=== Other places ===
- San Fernando, Bolívar, Colombia
- San Fernando, Chile
- San Fernando Canton, Ecuador
- San Fernando, Ocotepeque, Honduras
- San Fernando, Nueva Segovia, Nicaragua
- San Fernando District, Peru
- San Fernando, Trinidad and Tobago

== Sports ==
- Club San Fernando, Argentine multi-sports club
- CD San Fernando, Spanish dissolved football club
- CD San Fernando de Henares, Spanish football club
- San Fernando CD, Spanish football club
- UD San Fernando, Spanish football club

== Massacres ==
- 2010 San Fernando massacre and 2011 San Fernando massacre, two massacres in San Fernando, Tamaulipas, Mexico.
- 1868 San Fernando massacre, a massacre during the Triple Alliance War in Paraguay.

== See also ==
- Saint Ferdinand
- San Fernando Airport (disambiguation)
