= Inés Rodríguez Girón =

Castilian infanta

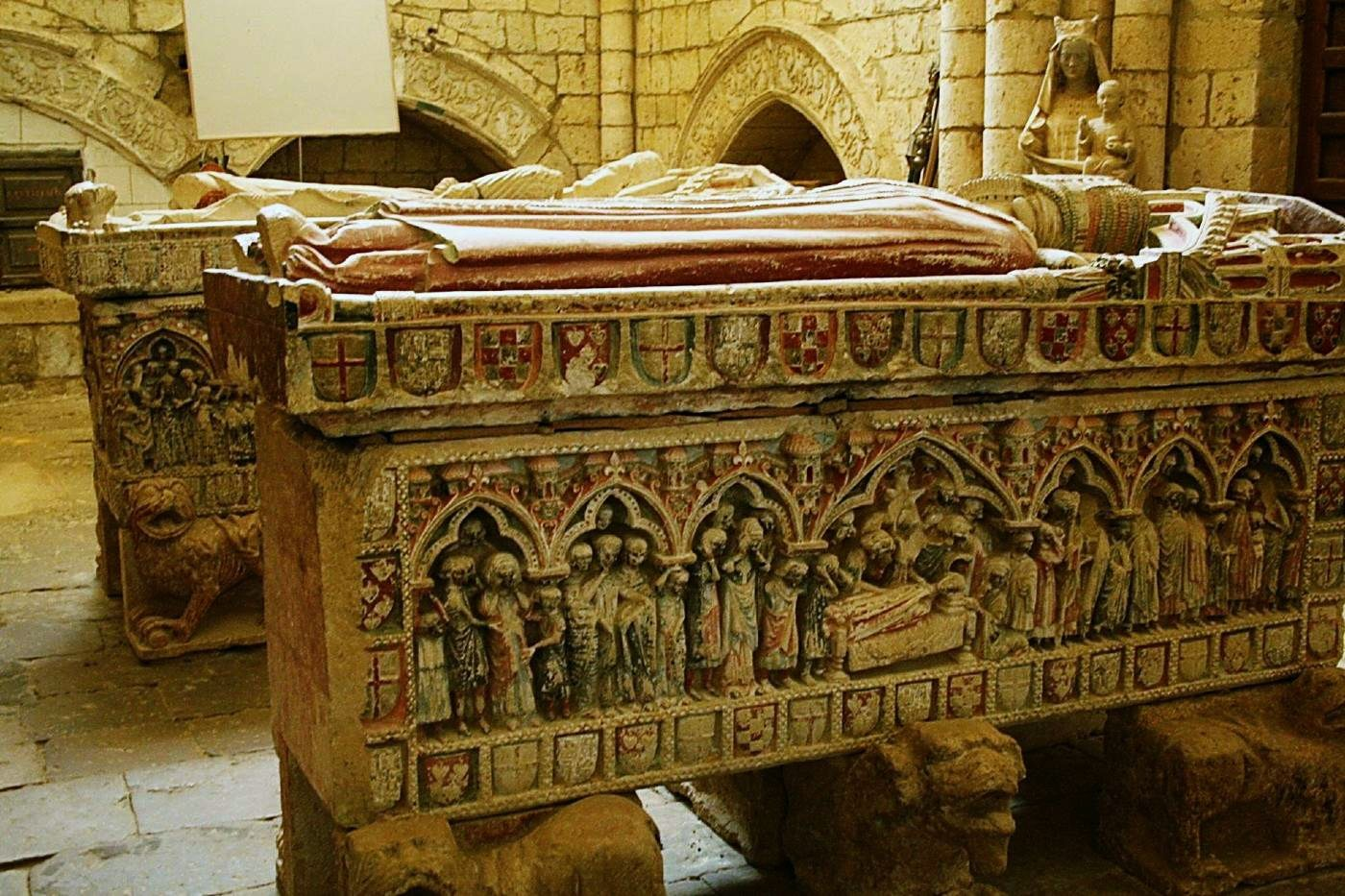
- Tombs of Infante Philip and Infanta Inés
- Died: 1265; Seville
- Burial: Villalcázar de Sirga
- Spouse: Infante Philip of Castile
- House: Girón
- Father: Rodrigo González Girón
- Mother: Teresa López de Haro

Inés Rodríguez Girón (died in 1265) was infanta of the Kingdom of Castile as the second wife of Infante Philip of Castile.

== Biography ==
Her parents were Rodrigo González Girón, Lord of Frechilla, and his second wife, Teresa López de Haro. Her maternal grandparents were Lope Díaz II de Haro and Urraca Alfonso, the illegitimate daughter of King Alfonso IX of León. Inés married her mother's second cousin, Infante Philip, in 1263 or 1264, after the death of his first spouse, Christina of Norway, becoming Lady of Valdeporchena, Piedrahita and Valdecorneja. The couple had no children. Infanta Inés died in Seville in 1265 and her husband remarried, his third wife being Leonor Rodríguez de Castro.

She is buried in Villalcázar de Sirga, in the Church of Santa María la Blanca. Her husband, who died in 1274 predeceasing his third wife, is buried next to her, in a larger tomb. The remains of both rested in two tomb, placed in the choir of the church, but today the two tombs are placed in the chapel of Santiago.

The tomb containing the remains of Inés Rodríguez Girón is smaller than the one containing the remains of her husband. The style shows that both were done at the same time. The tomb only has sculpture work on the sides, but not at the head or feet. On the lid of the tomb appears a recumbent statue representing the deceased. Ines Rodriguez's head rests on three pillows, like that of her husband.

== Bibliography ==
- Del Arco y Garay, Ricardo (1954). Sepulcros de la Casa Real de Castilla. Madrid: Instituto Jerónimo Zurita. Consejo Superior de Investigaciones Científicas.
- De Loaysa, Jofré; García Martínez, Antonio (1982). Crónicas de los Reyes de Castilla Fernando III, Alfonso X, Sancho IV y Fernando IV (1248-1305) (in Latin and Spanish) (2nd ed.). Murcia: Academia Alfonso X el Sabio. ISBN 84-00-05017-7.
- Rubio Salán, Antonio (1952). "Breve noticia de Villalcazar de Sirga y de su Templo". Publicaciones de la Institución Tello Téllez de Meneses (8). Palencia: Institución Tello Téllez de Meneses: 27–48. ISSN 0210-7317.
- Salazar y Mendoza, Pedro de; Soria Mesa, Enrique; Carrillo, Alonso (1998). El origen de las dignidades seglares de Castilla y León (1st ed.). Granada: Universidad de Granada. ISBN 84-338-2453-8.
- Ybarra y López-Dóriga, Fernando de (1997). Un largo siglo de amores y desamores en el Alcázar de Sevilla (1248-1368) (1st ed.). Sevilla: Real Academia Sevillana de Buenas Letras. ISBN 84-8093-016-0.
