= Sancho of Castile (bishop) =

- Archbishop of Toledo
- Coat of arms of Castile & León
- Born: 1233
- Died: 27 October 1261 (aged 27–28)
- House: Castilian House of Ivrea
- Father: Ferdinand III of Castile
- Mother: Elisabeth of Swabia
- Religion: Roman Catholicism

Infante Sancho of Castile (1233 – 27 October 1261) was Archbishop of Toledo and Chancellor of Castile from 1259 until his death.

== Biography ==
Sancho was the seventh child and sixth son of King Ferdinand III of Castile and his first wife, Elisabeth of Swabia. His father had him and his older brother Philip prepared for an ecclesiastical career. Their paternal grandmother, the former Queen Berengaria of Castile, entrusted Rodrigo Jiménez de Rada, Archbishop of Toledo, with their upbringing. The Archbishop sent the infantes to the University of Paros, where they were taught by Albert the Great.

Infante Sancho became Archbishop of Toledo in 1259. He was present at the Cortes of Seville in 1261, but the Infante's entry with archepiscopal cross in December 1260 caused an incident involving him and Raimundo de Losana, Archbishop of Seville. The Archbishop of Seville was offended and considered this a threat to the autonomy of his see. Sancho, however, stated that that was not his intention.

Archbishop Sancho died aged 28. The place of his burial is uncertain; he may have been buried in the Cathedral of Toledo or in the Abbey of Santa María la Real de Las Huelgas.

== Ancestors ==
Ancestors of Sancho of Castile (bishop)

16. Alfonso VII of León and Castile
8. Ferdinand II of León
17. Berenguela of Barcelona
4. Alfonso IX of León
18. Afonso I of Portugal
9. Urraca of Portugal
19. Maud of Savoy
2. Ferdinand III of Castile
20. Sancho III of Castile
10. Alfonso VIII of Castile
21. Blanche of Navarre
5. Berenguela of Castile
22. Henry II of England
11. Eleanor of England
23. Eleanor of Aquitaine
1. Sancho of Castile
24. Frederick II, Duke of Swabia
12. Frederick I, Holy Roman Emperor
25. Judith of Bavaria
6. Philip, King of Germany
26. Renaud III, Count of Burgundy
13. Beatrice I, Countess of Burgundy
27. Agatha of Lorraine
3. Elisabeth of Hohenstaufen
28. Andronikos Doukas Angelos
14. Isaac II Angelos
29. Euphrosyne Kastamonitissa
7. Irene Angelina
30. George Komnenodoukas Palaiologos; (1125–1168)
15. Unknown Palaiologina?, afterwards Irene
31. ?Irene Komnene Kantakouzene?

== Bibliography ==
- González Jiménez, Manuel: Alfonso X el Sabio. Barcelona: Editorial Ariel S. A. ISBN 84-344-6758-5.

== See also ==
- Frederick of Castile
- Henry of Castile the Senator
- Christina of Norway, Infanta of Castile

Sancho of Castile (bishop) House of Burgundy Born: 1133 Died: 27 October 1261
Catholic Church titles
Preceded by Gutierre Ruiz Dolea	Archbishop of Toledo; 1259-1261	Vacant Title next held by Domingo Pascual as archbishop-elect
