= Philip of Castile =

- Infante of Castile; Lord of Valdecorneja
- Coat of arms of Philip of Castile
- Born: 1231
- Died: 28 November 1274 (aged 42–43)
- Burial: Villalcázar de Sirga
- Spouse: Christina of Norway; Inés Rodríguez Girón; Leonor Rodríguez de Castro
- House: Castilian House of Ivrea
- Father: Ferdinand III of Castile
- Mother: Beatrice of Swabia

Philip of Castile (Spanish: Felipe de Castilla y Suabia; 1231 – 28 November 1274) was an Infante of Castile and son of Ferdinand III, King of Castile and León, and his first queen, Beatrice of Swabia. He was Lord of Valdecorneja, and, according to some sources, Knight of the Order of the Temple, in one of those churches, the Church of Santa María la Blanca in Villalcázar de Sirga, he was buried in a coffin adorned with emblems of the Templars.

An archbishop-elect of Seville, he was also abbot of the Collegiate church of Santa María la Mayor in Valladolid and of the Collegiate Church of Saints Cosme and Damian in Covarrubias until 1258, when he left his ecclesiastical career with the consent of his brother, King Alfonso X, despite the latter's opposition, and married Christina of Norway, daughter of King Haakon IV of Norway.

== Youth ==
Infante Philip of Castile was born in 1231 as the son of Ferdinand III and Beatrice of Swabia. He was named after his maternal grandfather, Philip of Swabia, King of Germany and Duke of Swabia. From childhood he was groomed by his father, King Ferdinand III, for an ecclesiastical career, along with his brother Infante Sancho, who would later become Archbishop of Toledo. During his youth, after his upbringing was entrusted by his grandmother, Queen Berengaria, to Rodrigo Jiménez de Rada, who would also become Archbishop of Toledo, he was sent to Paris for his studies, receiving lessons from Albertus Magnus, the teacher of Thomas Aquinas. In 1249 Infante Philip was named Procurator of the Archdiocese of Seville by Pope Innocent IV. Two years later, in 1251, he was named archbishop-elect of Seville by the same pope. The archdiocese continued to be administered by Raimundo de Losana, Bishop of Segovia, as the infante had not yet been consecrated a bishop.

In 1258, shortly after his brother the king, in spite of his initial opposition, authorized him to leave his ecclesiastical career, Infante Philip married Christina of Norway, daughter of King Haakon IV. A legend held in the past that Christina came to Spain after Alfonso X asked Haakon to send one of his daughters to marry, due to the infertility of his wife, Queen Violant, daughter of King James I of Aragon. Nonetheless, the falsehood of the legend is demonstrated by the fact that Queen Violant had already given birth to several children by 1258. In fact, Haakon sent Christina to Castile to marry one of the king's brothers. On her way to Castile, the princess passed through France and Aragon, where she was received with full honors by James I, who ended up proposing marriage to her. On her arrival at the Castilian court, which at the time was in Valladolid, in January 1258, Christina was presented to the king's brothers, especially to Infantes Frederick and Philip, among whom she was to choose a husband. Apparently, the princess preferred Philip to Frederick, due to a scar which the latter had on his lip, disfiguring his face. However, in a later document, Alfonso X stated that it had been his decision that the Norwegian princess marry Infante Philip.

The wedding of Philip and Christina was held in April 1258 in Valladolid. Alfonso X then granted several income streams to Infante Philip, including the land tax, tolls, rents of the Jews, and the remaining royal revenue of Ávila, as well as the church taxes of the Archdiocese of Toledo and the dioceses of Ávila and Segovia, the rents paid to the king by the Muslims of the Valley of Purchena, and the estate of Valdecorneja, composed of the towns of El Barco de Ávila, Piedrahita, La Horcajada and Almirón. The vacancy left by Infante Philip in the Archdiocese of Seville was not filled until May 1259, when Pope Alexander IV named Raimundo de Losana to the post.

Infante Philip attended the Cortes of Seville of 1261, as well as the wedding of his nephew Infante Ferdinand de la Cerda, son and heir of his brother King Alfonso X, which was held on 30 November 1269.

== Revolt of the nobles of 1272 ==
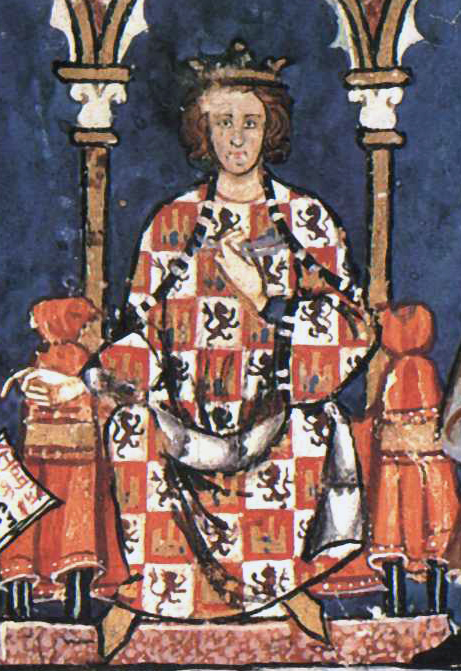
Representation of Alfonso X the Wise, King of Castile and León.

In early 1272, a group of nobles, including Nuño González "the Good" de Lara, Esteban Fernández de Castro, Simón Ruiz de los Cameros, Lord of Los Cameros, and Lope Díaz III de Haro, Lord of Biscay, met in the town of Lerma with the purpose of committing to fight against King Alfonso X if he did not yield to their demands. They agreed that Infante Philip, present at the meeting and spokesman for the conspirators, should meet with the King of Navarre in order to convince him to grant them asylum if they found themselves obliged to leave the Kingdom of Castile and León. Infante Philip, widowed of his first two wives, was then married to Leonor Rodríguez de Castro, the daughter of Nuño González de Lara's sister.

Nuño González de Lara was upset with the king due to, among other reasons, his failure to grant him Durango, his criticisms of his performance at the defense of Jerez de la Frontera and, perhaps, his own disagreement with some of the king's behavior toward the Kingdom of Portugal, although most of the Castilian nobles agreed primarily in their opposition to King Alfonso's style of governance, as they all preferred the style of earlier times, when the nobles played a more important role.

After the meeting of the noble plotters in Lerma, Alfonso X tried to find out what had actually happened there, communicating with Infante Philip and Lara. However, Infante Philip avoided answering the questions raised by his brother, at the time when he excused himself from leading his troops to Andalusia in the king's service, as he alleged that there had been a delay in the payment of his annual officers' salary, and told his brother that his presence at the meeting at Lerma was due to the advice and assistance which the infante said he needed, for he claimed that his old friends had died and that he "could not be without some friends who would assist and advise him."

As far as he was concerned, and despite having taken part in it, Nuño González de Lara told the king that the purpose of the meeting in Lerma had not been the one attributed to it, and he even showed himself ready to work with him in order that new taxes might be collected, besides those already envisioned, in Castile and Extremadura, adding that in that way the king could repay his debt to the nobles, as he owed them several installments of their officers' salary. At the beginning of July 1272, Alfonso X ordered Nuño González de Lara, his brother Infante Philip, and all the nobles of the kingdom to come with their men to Seville to assist Infante Ferdinand de la Cerda, who at the time was defending the frontier from attack by the Muslims, and the unanimous response of all the participants in the nobles' conspiracy was to refuse to come, unless the king met with them first. Nuño González de Lara pretended to break with the conspirators and informed the king of the contacts being maintained by the rebel nobles with the King of Navarre, although, shortly afterwards, a series of letters were discovered which proved the involvement in the conspiracy of the Marinid sultan, who wished to weaken the position of the Castilian monarch. In spite of the discovery of the letters proving the nobles' treachery, Alfonso X ignored them and was ready to negotiate with the rebels, although he ordered them to suspend their conversations with the King of Navarre, an order which they disobeyed. Nuño González de Lara declared the end of his agreement with Alfonso X, which obliged him not to establish common positions with either Muslims or Christians without previously informing the king.

In September 1272 negotiations resumed in the city of Burgos, although the nobles refused to lodge in the city and did so in nearby towns, and from there communicated to the king that if he wished to send them a message he should do so via his emissaries. The conspirators then presented their demands to the king, complaining about his forcing them to abide by the Royal Fuero, the lack of special judges in the Court to judge noblemen according to their own fuero, and the behavior of the governors and other officials of the Crown. Moreover, they asked him to reduce the frequency of their service to the Cortes, to exempt them from payment of the Burgos municipal tax, and to found no more new towns in Castile and León. Shortly thereafter Alfonso X signed an alliance with the Kingdom of Navarre, thereby annulling the agreements made between the rebel nobles and Navarre.

After the Cortes of Burgos of 1272, in which it seemed that the king would reach an agreement with the rebel nobles, negotiations were broken off and the rebels, including Infante Philip and Nuño González de Lara, left for the Kingdom of Granada, in spite of Alfonso's final attempt to persuade them, through his intermediaries Infante Ferdinand de la Cerda and his brother Manuel not to abandon his kingdom. Before heading for Granada, the nobles sacked the countryside, stealing cattle and laying waste to some of the territory on their way, in spite of the king's sending them messengers bearing letters in which he reminded the rebels of the favors they had received from him, as well as their treacherous rupturing of the bonds between vassal and sovereign. He specifically reproached Nuño González de Lara for the fact that, during his youth, he had granted him the estate of Écija over the objections of his father King Ferdinand III.

Nonetheless, the rebel nobles ignored the king's entreaties and continued on to Granada, where they were afforded all honors by King Mohammed I, after signing a treaty with him in Sabiote, in which the nobles and Muhammad committed to mutual assistance against Alfonso X until the latter yielded to their demands. The treaty of Sabiote was signed by, among others, Infante Philip, Nuño González de Lara, Lope Díaz de Haro, Lord of Biscay, Esteban Fernández de Castro, Diego López V de Haro, and Álvar Díaz de Asturias.

In January 1273, in Tudela, Infante Philip, Nuño González de Lara and his sons Juan Núñez "the Fat" de Lara and Nuño González de Lara y León, Lope Díaz III de Haro, and Álvar Díaz de Asturias, among other nobles, paid homage to King Henry I of Navarre, to whom they presented documentation of the harm they claimed to have suffered at the hands of Alfonso X, and the demands they made of him, remaining thereby free of any commitment to Alfonso at the time when, without detriment to their honor, they passed into the service of the King of Navarre in the same way in which they had previously served the King of Granada.

The king sent the dean of the Cathedral of Seville, Fernán Pérez, to talk to Infante Philip in order to persuade him to leave the nobles' party; this attempt failed. At the beginning of 1273, Juan Núñez de Lara, who until then had acted as a mediator, along with the Bishop of Cuenca, between his father Nuño and the king, abandoned the latter.

In spite of this, Alfonso X, who wished to win election to the Imperial throne, allowed some members of the royal family, including the infantes Ferdinand de la Cerda and Manuel, Queen Violant, and Archbishop Sancho of Toledo, son of James I and brother of the queen, and the grand masters of the military orders, to resume negotiations with the exiled nobles. After numerous negotiations, and advice given the king by, among others, his brother Infante Fadrique and Simón Ruiz de los Cameros, he yielded to most of the demands presented by the exiled nobles via Nuño González de Lara, who in 1273 met with Queen Violant in Córdoba, and at the end of that year, the exiled nobles returned to the Kingdom of Castile and León, while at the same time King Muhammed II of Granada declared himself a vassal of Alfonso X, although his Chronicles erroneously place these events in 1274. In July 1273, the signatures of Fernando Rodríguez de Castro, Simón Ruiz de los Cameros, and Diego López de Haro, younger brother of Lope Díaz III de Haro, once again begin to appear on royal documents. Those of Lope, Nuño González de Lara, and his son Juan Núñez "the Fat" de Lara do not appear until the beginning of 1274. Nuño González de Lara's signature began to appear once more on royal privileges on 24 January 1274, having not done so since 15 July 1272. In the beginning of 1274 he was named Governor of Andalusia, according to the Crónica de Alfonso X el Sabio.

== Death and burial ==
Infante Philip of Castile died on 28 November 1274, the date which is engraved on his tomb, at the age of 43.

His body was buried in the Church of Santa María la Blanca, a church linked to the Order of the Temple, and located in Villalcázar de Sirga, in the province of Palencia, 10 km from Carrión de los Condes.

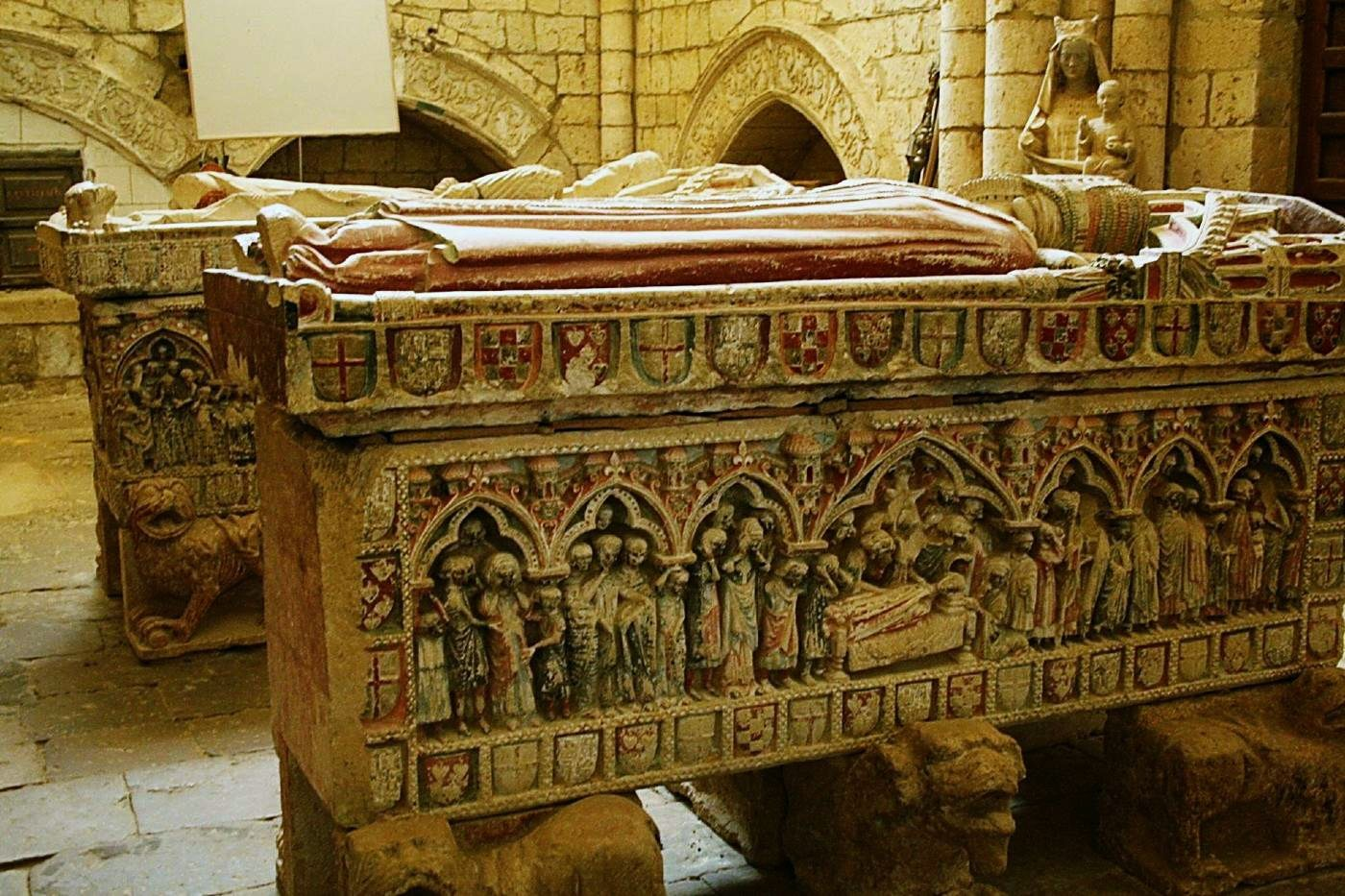
Tombs of Infante Philip of Castile and his second wife, Inés Rodríguez Girón. Her tomb appears in the foreground. Church of Santa María la Blanca, Villalcázar de Sirga.

The same church houses the tomb of his second wife, Inés Rodríguez Girón, although in the past it was believed to be that of his third wife, Leonor Rodríguez de Castro, an idea disproved by the arms and heraldic emblems engraved on the tomb, which are not those of the House of Castro, but rather those of the Girón family.

The remains of Infante Philip lie in a Gothic tomb, located in the church's chapel of St James, next to the tomb of his second wife. In the same chapel there is a third tomb, dating from the 14th century, in which lie the remains of a knight of the Order of Santiago. The graves of the Infante and his wife were previously located in the church's choir, until the provincial Commission of Monuments decided to move them to their current location.

== Marriage and children ==
Infante Philip of Castile first married, in 1258, Christina of Norway. She died in Seville in 1262 without issue, and was buried in the Collegiate Church of Saints Cosmas and Damian in Covarrubias, where Philip had been the abbot before resigning his ecclesiastical duties.

He then married Inés Rodríguez Girón. She died in 1265 and was buried in the Church of Santa María la Blanca in Villalcázar de Sirga.

He then married Leonor Rodríguez de Castro. This third marriage produced a son named Philip. He died in childhood and was buried in the Convent of San Felices de Amaya, a convent of the Order of Calatrava in the province of Burgos, where his mother is also buried. It is currently in a state of ruin.

The genealogist and historian José Pellicer de Ossau has recorded in his works the existence of another child born of this marriage, a daughter named Beatrice, although Luis de Salazar y Castro rejects this notion: Blanche of Portugal bequeathed her the sum of 2000 maravedís. She married Diego Pérez Sarmiento and died in 1340.

Infante Philip had several children out of wedlock by unknown women:

- Fernando Alfonso
- Alfonso Fernández (1263? – 1284). He served as Mayordomo mayor at the court of his uncle Alfonso X in 1283.
- Beatriz Fernández, a nun at the Abbey of Santa María la Real de Las Huelgas in Burgos. In July 1290, the abbess of the convent gave her license to dispose of her inheritance according to her own judgment. In January 1295, she returned the village of San Cristóbal del Monte, along with all its estates, land taxes, and rights, to the council of Belorado, the jurisdiction in which it had been up until King Sancho IV of Castile detached it to give to her in 1288.

== Bibliography ==
- Excma. Diputación Provincial de Palencia, Departamento de Cultura, ed. (1988). Jornadas sobre el Gótico en la provincia de Palencia. Excma. Diputación Provincial de Palencia, Departamento de Cultura. p. 18. ISBN 84-86844-04-5.
- González, Julio (2009). Las Conquistas de Fernando III en Andalucía. Valladolid: Editorial Maxtor. ISBN 978-84-9761-277-7.
- De Loaysa, Jofré; García Martínez, Antonio (1982). Crónicas de los Reyes de Castilla Fernando III, Alfonso X, Sancho IV y Fernando IV (1248-1305) (2nd ed.). Murcia: Academia Alfonso X el Sabio. ISBN 84-00-05017-7.
- Menezo Otero, Juan José (2005). Reinos y Jefes de Estado desde el 712 (5th ed.). Madrid: Historia Hispana. ISBN 84-604-9610-4.
- Pérez Algar, Félix (1997). Alfonso X el Sabio: Biografía. Madrid: Studium Generalis. ISBN 84-605-6339-1.
- Rubio Salán, Antonio (1952). "Breve noticia de Villalcazar de Sirga y de su Templo". Publicaciones de la Institución Tello Téllez de Meneses (8). Palencia: Institución Tello Téllez de Meneses: 27–48. ISSN 0210-7317.
- de Salazar y Castro, Luis (1697). Mateo de Llanos y Guzman (ed.). Historia genealógica de la Casa de Lara. Vol. 3. Madrid.
- Salazar y Mendoza, Pedro de; Soria Mesa, Enrique; Carrillo, Alonso (1998). El origen de las dignidades seglares de Castilla y León. Granada: Universidad de Granada. ISBN 84-338-2453-8.
- Valdeón Baruque, Julio (1986). Alfonso X el Sabio. Castilla y León: Junta de Castilla y León, Consejería de Educación y Cultura. ISBN 84-505-3366-X.
- Fernando de Ybarra y López-Dóriga (1997). Un largo siglo de amores y desamores en el Alcázar de Sevilla (1248-1368). Seville: Real Academia Sevillana de Buenas Letras. ISBN 84-8093-016-0.

Philip of Castile House of Ivrea Born: 1131 Died: 28 November 1274
Religious titles
Vacant Seville part of Almohad Caliphate Title last held by Clement as ordained archbishop	Archbishop-elect of Seville; 1251-1258	Vacant Title next held by Raimundo de Losana as ordained archbishop
