= Norway–Spain relations =

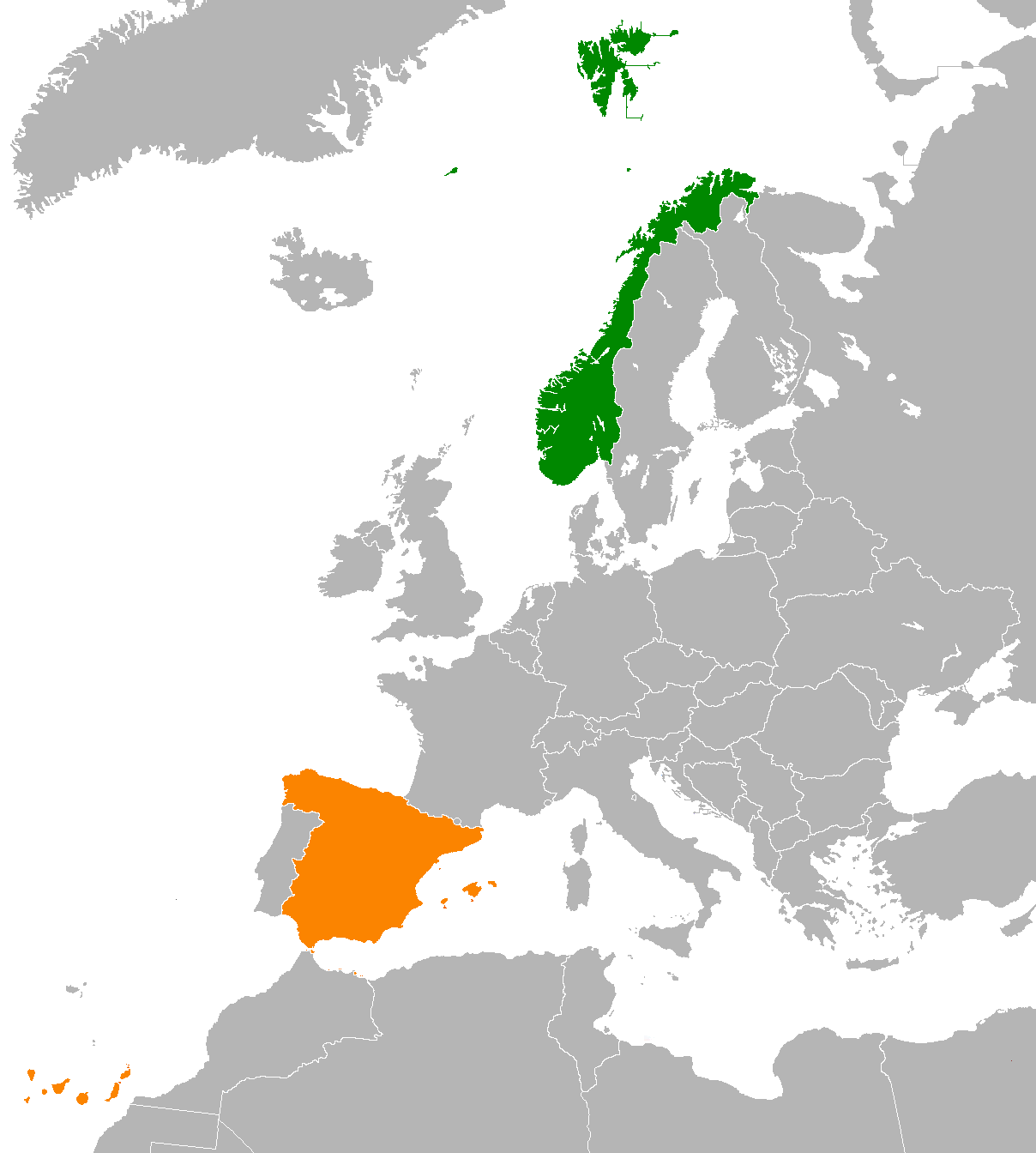
- Norway: Spain

Norway–Spain relations are the bilateral and diplomatic relations between these two countries. Norway has an embassy in Madrid, and honorary consulates in Algeciras, Barcelona, Benidorm, Bilbao, Gijón, Gerona, La Coruña, Las Palmas de Gran Canaria, Málaga, Palma de Mallorca, Sevilla, Santa Cruz de Tenerife, Torrevieja, and Valencia. Spain has an embassy in Oslo, also accredited for Iceland. Relations between Spain and Norway are mainly defined by their membership in NATO and the Schengen Area. Spain is a member of the European Union. Norway is not a member of the European Union.

Spain is an important partner for Norway in Europe and maintains close cooperation in the political, commercial and cultural fields. Both countries have common interests, both in Europe and globally. The Norwegian ambassador, Johan Vibe, classified relations between Spain and Norway as excellent, very close and cordial. The Princess Christina of Norway Foundation was created to strengthen Spanish-Norwegian relations.

== Bilateral relations ==
Bilateral Spanish-Norwegian political relations have traditionally passed in a tone of friendship and cordiality, with a continuing political dialogue on issues of mutual interest. This bilateral relationship has important permanent assets, such as the excellent relationship between the Royal Houses of both countries and the numerous personal contacts created by the flow of more than one million Norwegians who visit Spain annually (almost ¼ of the population), being Spain the main tourist destination of the Norwegians, which generates a stream of sympathy and a growing interest in Spanish culture and language. Furthermore, Norwegians are the fastest growing European community in Arguineguín, Mazarrón, Torrevieja, and l'Alfàs del Pi (the latter being the second largest colony of Norwegians in the world, only behind London). Approximately 50,000 Norwegians call Spain their home (almost 1% of the population of Norway).

Spain and Norway also maintain a positive collaboration in multilateral organizations, especially in United Nations. Spain and Norway have also been the two co-sponsors of the V World Congress against the death penalty, which was held in Madrid in June 2013.

Government-to-government relations, for their part, maintain a positive tone in all its dimensions, with some important elements of bilateral cooperation, such as defense. There is a certain mutual bilateral interest, since the Spanish armed forces are interested in using the training resources in conditions of extreme cold available to the Norwegian armed forces and, reciprocally, the Norwegian armed forces have an interest in training in arid climates such as those that exist in some areas of Spain. The good level of bilateral relations does not prevent, however, that there is a point where divergences are maintained: fishing in the Svalbard archipelago.

Leaving the legal issue in the background safe, the fisheries authorities of both countries hold regular technical conversations to clarify the framework in which Spanish fishing activity takes place in Norway.

== Economic relations ==
Traditionally there has been a trade imbalance between the two countries due to purchases of Norwegian oil and gas, which represent around 70% of Spanish imports. On the other hand, the Spanish export to Norway is very diversified in its products: ships, cars, machinery and the agri-food sector, among others. The balance of services partly compensates for the above, mainly thanks to tourism: 1,540,000 Norwegians (over a population of five million inhabitants) visit Spain annually (2014). Throughout 2014, 1,533,295 Norwegians visited Spain (over a population of five million inhabitants), which represents a growth of 1% compared to 2013. During the first five months of 2015 a certain decrease in the number of Norwegian tourists to Spain was observed, and in that period 521,778 Norwegians had visited Spain (decrease of −9.3% over the same period of the previous year).

== International organizations ==
Spain became a member of the EU in 1986, whereas Norway is not a member. While Norway is one of the founding members of NATO, Spain became a member in 1982.

== Resident diplomatic missions ==
- Norway has an embassy in Madrid.
- Spain has an embassy in Oslo.
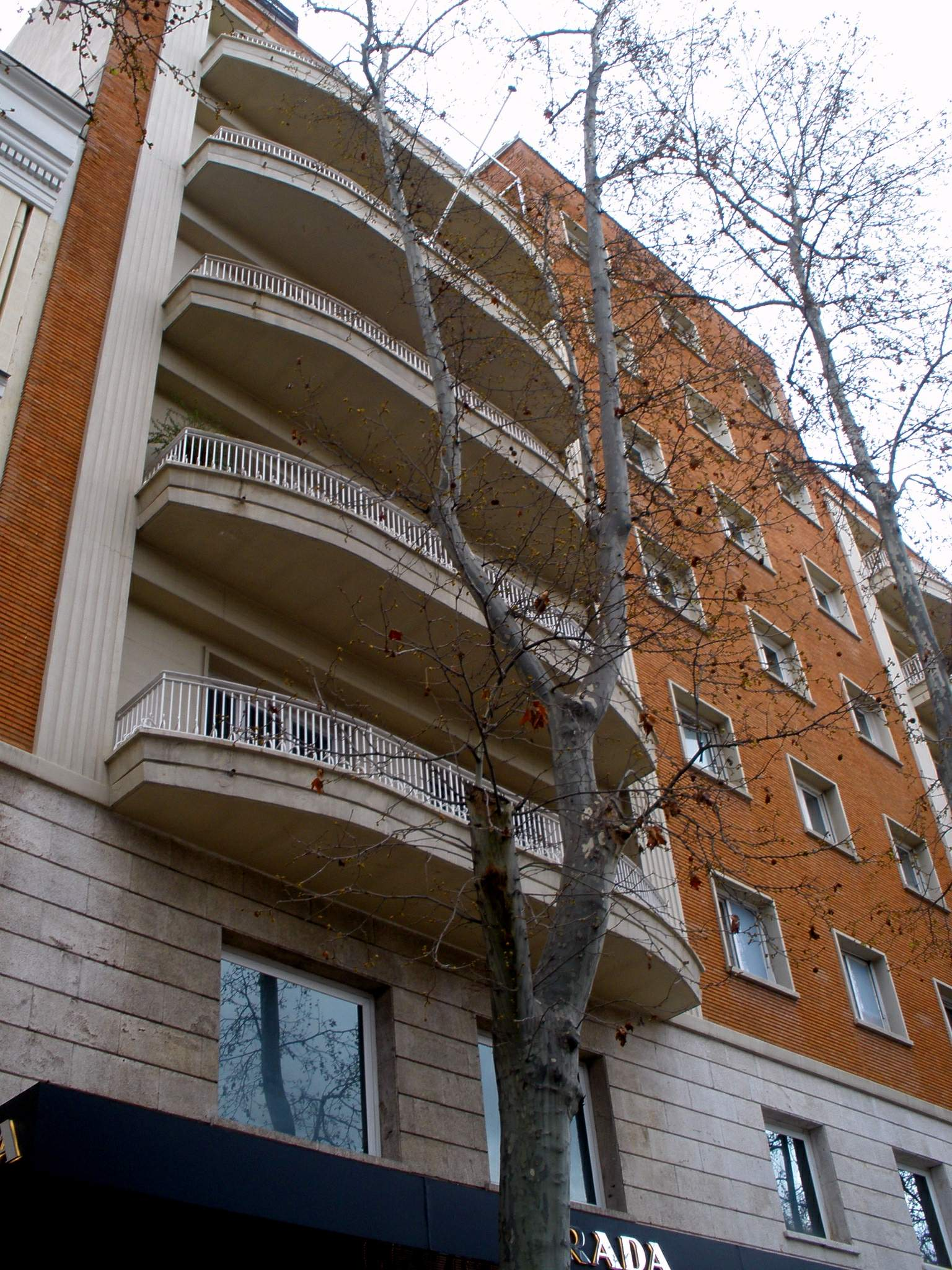
Embassy of Norway in Madrid

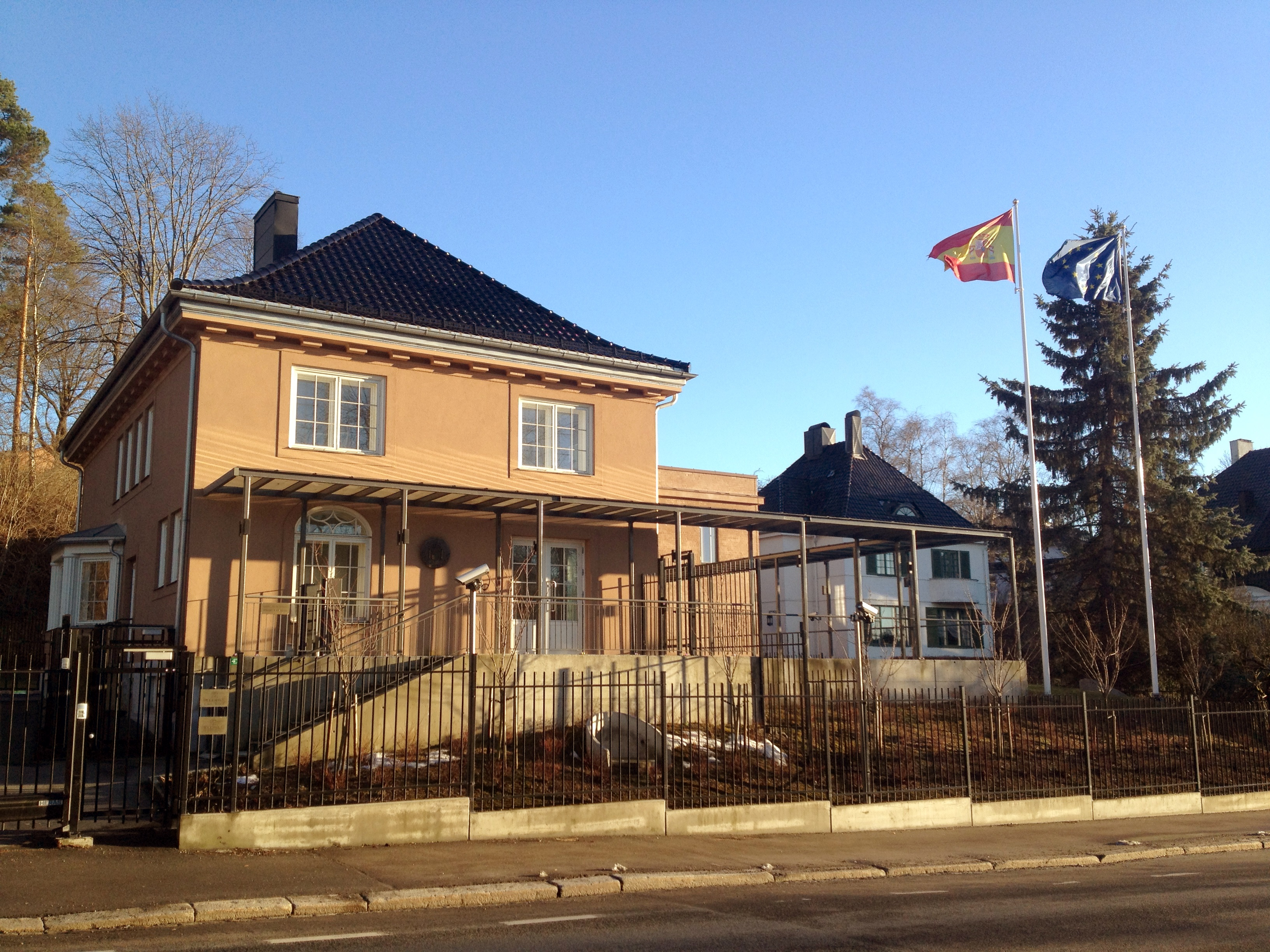
Embassy of Spain in Oslo

== See also ==
- Foreign relations of Norway
- Foreign relations of Spain
- Norway–EU relations
