= Convento de Las Descalzas Reales, Valladolid =

Monasterio de las Descalzas Reales
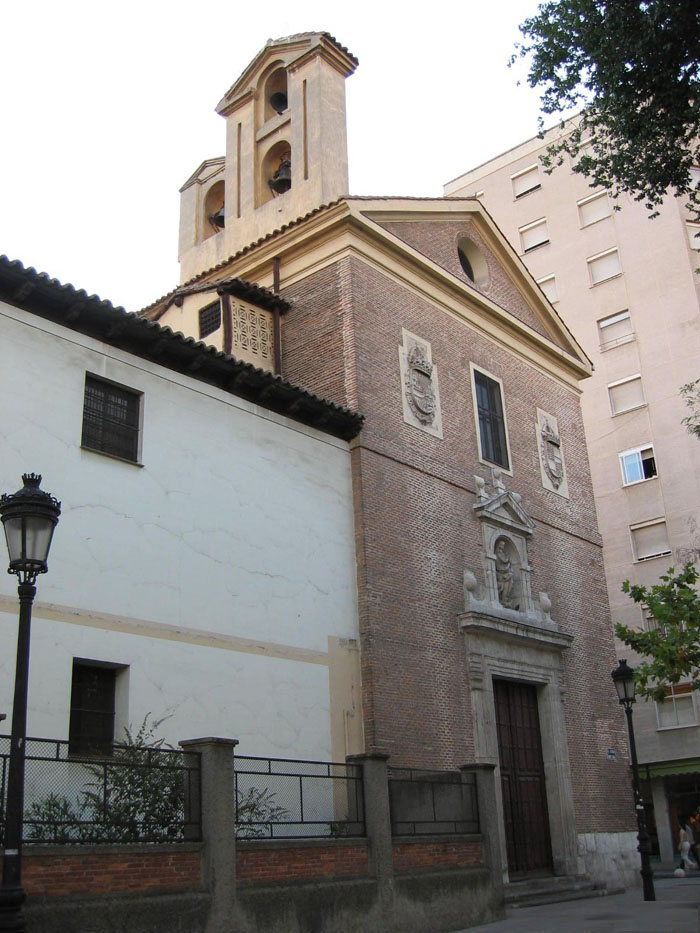
- Monasterio de las Descalzas Reales
- 41°39′21″N 4°43′16″W
- Location: Valladolid, Castile and León, Spain
- Denomination: Roman Catholic

History
- Founded: 1550

Architecture
- Heritage designation: National Monument
- Designated: 1974
- Architect: Francisco de Mora
- Architectural type: Classical Baroque

Administration
- Diocese: Valladolid

The Monasterio de las Descalzas Reales is a monastery located in Valladolid, in Castile and León, Spain. Literally the Monastery of the Barefoot Royals, the name refers to the practice of the usage of the Colettine branch of the Order of St. Clare to be barefoot while within the cloister. This monastery is to be distinguished from a similarly named one in Madrid of the same Order (see Convent of Las Descalzas Reales).

The monastery was originally established in Villalcázar de Sirga in 1550 and was dedicated to Our Lady of Pity. It has been based in Valladolid since 1552, when the community moved to its permanent home, and its dedication was changed to Our Lady of the Assumption by order of King Philip III of Spain, who also initiated a rebuilding program.

The monastery occupies a spacious site in the city, between calle de Ramón y Cajal (in front of the Chancillería), at the corner of calle de San Martín and calle del Prado. Its present building is in 17th-century neo-classical style to designs by Francisco de Mora.

== History ==
The community of this convent belongs to the Order of the Barefoot Franciscans of St. Clare, Lady of Mercy. The foundation took place in 1550, in Villalcázar de Sirga (Palencia), also known as Villasirga. Two years later the community moved to Valladolid with the help of its patron and protector, the Count of Oscorno. He was in charge of providing the convent with a home in Puerta del Campo, in the hope of definitively occupying the area in front of the chancellery. The Book of Nuns and Monks attests to this:

Sister Mariana de Jesús, who was abbess in this convent [...] professed [...] in Santa Clara de Gandia [...] came to Rioja as foundress and was in that convent [...] from there she came to the convent of Villasirga, which was the same one that is now in Valladolid, which the Counts of Osorno, who were patrons, brought and transferred to this city

In order to house the community in the chancellery, so that the nuns could continue with the monastic life, it was necessary to buy out various nobles' houses. In 1552, Fadrique Osorio of Toledo and his wife, Inés de Pimentel, Marquess of Villafranca, bought for the convent the Palace of Alonso de Argüello (secretary to the Majesty), the houses licensed to Galarza (of the council to His Majesty), and those licensed to Ortiz (professor of the University of Valladolid). All of these buildings were perfectly suited to life in a convent.

In 1595 the patronage of the convent changed to Francisco Enríquez de Almansa (knight of Santiago and Gentleman of His Majesty's Mouth) together with his wife Mariana de Zúñiga y Velasco. They pledged to build a new church and a building that was adequate to be used as a monastery, and to pay an annual rent of 200 maravedíes, in exchange for acquiring the main chapel for his burial and that of his family.

== Conservation ==
The complex, which still survives, consists of a church, a cloister, a courtyard, outbuildings and a garden. In 2007 it was home to 13 Colettine Poor Clares, financed by an industrial laundry within the monastery. It has been a National Monument since 1974.
