= Sancho of Castile =

Sancho of Castile may refer to:

- Sancho García of Castile (died 1017), Sancho of the Good Laws, Count of Castile
- Sancho II of León and Castile (c. 1037–1072), Sancho the Strong, King of Castile and of León
- Sancho III of Castile (1134–1158), Sancho the Desired, King of Castile and of Toledo
- Sancho of Castile (bishop) (1233–1261), Castilian infante and Archbishop of Toledo
- Sancho IV of Castile (1258–1295), Sancho the Brave, King of Castile and León
- Sancho Alfonso, 1st Count of Alburquerque (1342–1374), Castilian infante
