= Ferdinand III of Castile =

King of Castile (1217–1252) and León (1230–1252)

Saint Ferdinand III
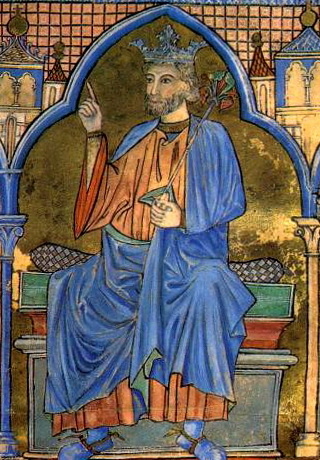
- Ferdinand III in a 13th-century miniature

King of Castile and Toledo
- Reign: 31 August 1217 – 30 May 1252
- Predecessor: Berengaria
- Successor: Alfonso X
- Co-ruler: Berengaria (1217–1246)

King of León and Galicia
- Reign: 24 September 1230 (de facto) or 11 December 1230 (de jure) – 30 May 1252
- Predecessor: Sancha and Dulce (de jure); Alfonso IX (de facto)
- Successor: Alfonso X
- Born: 1199/1201; Monastery of Valparaíso, Peleas de Arriba, Kingdom of León
- Died: 30 May 1252 (aged 50–53); Seville, Crown of Castile
- Burial: Seville Cathedral, Seville, Spain
- Spouses: Elisabeth of Swabia (m. 1219; died 1235) Joan, Countess of Ponthieu (m. 1237)
- Issue among others...: Alfonso X, King of Castile; Frederick of Castile; Henry the Senator; Philip, Lord of Valdecorneja; Sancho, Archbishop of Seville; Manuel, Lord of Villena; Ferdinand II, Count of Aumale; Eleanor, Queen of England
- House: Castilian House of Ivrea
- Father: Alfonso IX of León
- Mother: Berengaria of Castile
- Religion: Catholicism

Ferdinand III (Spanish: Fernando; 1199/1201 – 30 May 1252), called the Saint (el Santo), was King of Castile from 1217 and King of León from 1230 as well as King of Galicia from 1231. He was the son of Alfonso IX of León and Berengaria of Castile. Through his second marriage, he was also Count of Aumale. Ferdinand III was one of the most successful kings of Castile, securing not only the permanent union of the crowns of Castile and León, but also masterminding the most expansive southward territorial expansion campaign yet in the Guadalquivir Valley, in which Islamic rule was in disarray in the wake of the defeat of the Almohad caliphate at the Battle of Las Navas de Tolosa. His repeated and decisive victories against the Islamic Caliphate earned him the title Athleta Christi, meaning 'Champion of Christ', which was conferred upon him by Pope Gregory IX.

By military and diplomatic efforts, Ferdinand greatly expanded the dominions of Castile by annexing the crown of Guadalquivir river valley in the south of the Iberian Peninsula, establishing the boundaries of the Castilian state for the next two centuries. New territories included important cities such as Baeza, Úbeda, Jaén, Córdoba and Seville, that were subject of Repartimiento, given a new general charter and repopulated in the following years.

Ferdinand was canonized in 1671 by Pope Clement X. Places such as the cities of San Fernando, Pampanga and San Fernando, La Union; the Diocese of Ilagan and the San Fernando de Dilao Church in Paco, Manila; the San Fernando El Rey Church in Liloan, Cebu, Philippines; and in the United States, in California the City of San Fernando, the San Fernando Valley, and in Texas the Cathedral of San Fernando in San Antonio were named in his honor.

== Early life ==
The exact date of Ferdinand's birth is unclear. It has been proposed to have been as early as 1199 or even 1198, although more recent researchers commonly date Ferdinand's birth in the summer of 1201. Ferdinand was born at the Monastery of Valparaíso (Peleas de Arriba, in what is now the Province of Zamora).

As the son of Alfonso IX of León and his second wife Berengaria of Castile, Ferdinand descended from Alfonso VII of León and Castile on both sides; his paternal grandfather Ferdinand II of León and maternal great-grandfather Sancho III of Castile were the sons of Alfonso VII between whom his kingdom was divided. Ferdinand had other royal ancestors from his paternal grandmother Urraca of Portugal and his maternal grandmother Eleanor of England, a daughter of Henry II of England and Eleanor of Aquitaine.

The marriage of Ferdinand's parents was annulled by order of Pope Innocent III in 1204, due to consanguinity, but the legitimacy of the children was recognized. Berengaria then took their children, including Ferdinand, to the court of her father, King Alfonso VIII of Castile. In 1217, her younger brother, Henry I, died and she succeeded him on the Castilian throne with Ferdinand as her heir, but she quickly crowned him as co-ruler.

Alfonso of León considered himself tricked, and the young king had to begin his reign by a war against his father and a faction of the Castilian nobles. His and his mother's abilities proved too much for the king of Leon and his Castilian allies. Berengaria continued to be a key influence on Ferdinand, who followed her advice in prosecuting wars and even in the choice of a wife, Elisabeth of Swabia.

== Unification of Castile and León ==
When Ferdinand's father died in 1230, his will delivered the kingdom to his older daughters Sancha and Dulce, from his first marriage to Teresa of Portugal. But Ferdinand contested the will, and claimed the inheritance for himself. At length, an agreement was reached, negotiated primarily between their mothers, Berengaria and Teresa. The resulting treaty of Benavente was signed on 11 December 1230, by which Ferdinand received the Kingdom of León, in return for a substantial compensation in cash and lands for his half-sisters, Sancha and Dulce. Ferdinand thus became the first sovereign of both kingdoms since the death of Alfonso VII in 1157.

Early in his reign, Ferdinand had to deal with a rebellion of the House of Lara.

== Reconquest of al-Andalus ==
Since the Battle of Las Navas de Tolosa in 1212 halted the advance of the Almohads in Spain, a series of truces had kept Castile and the Almohad dominions of al-Andalus more-or-less at peace. However, a crisis of succession in the Almohad Caliphate after the death of Yusuf II in 1224 gave Ferdinand III an opportunity for intervention. The Andalusian-based claimant, Abdallah al-Adil, began to ship the bulk of Almohad arms and men across the straits to Morocco to contest the succession with his rival there, leaving al-Andalus relatively undefended. Al-Adil's rebellious cousin, Abdullah al-Bayyasi (the Baezan), appealed to Ferdinand III for military assistance against the usurper. In 1225, a Castilian army accompanied al-Bayyasi in a campaign, ravaging the regions of Jaén, vega de Granada and, before the end of the year, had successfully installed al-Bayyasi in Córdoba. In payment, al-Bayyasi gave Ferdinand the strategic frontier strongholds of Baños de la Encina, Salvatierra (the old Order of Calatrava fortress near Ciudad Real) and Capilla (the last of which had to be taken by siege). When al-Bayyasi was rejected and killed by a popular uprising in Córdoba shortly after, the Castilians remained in occupation of al-Bayyasi's holdings in Andújar, Baeza and Martos.

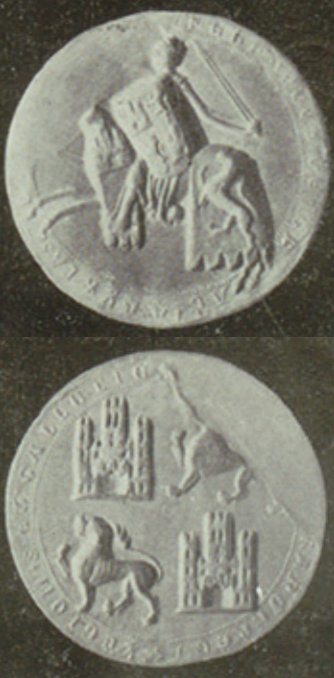
Equestrian seal (1237) of Ferdinand III, Quartering the arms of Castile and León

The crisis in the Almohad Caliphate, however, remained unresolved. In 1228, a new Almohad pretender, Idris al-Ma'mun, decided to abandon Spain, and left with the last remnant of the Almohad forces for Morocco. Al-Andalus was left fragmented in the hands of local strongmen, only loosely led by Muhammad ibn Yusuf ibn Hud al-Judhami. Seeing the opportunity, the Christian kings of the north – Ferdinand III of Castile, Alfonso IX of León, James I of Aragon and Sancho II of Portugal – immediately launched a series of raids on al-Andalus, renewed almost every year. There were no great battle encounters – Ibn Hud's makeshift Andalusian army was destroyed early on, while attempting to stop the Leonese at Alange in 1230. The Christian armies romped through the south virtually unopposed in the field. Individual Andalusian cities were left to resist or negotiate their capitulation by themselves, with little or no prospect of rescue from Morocco or anywhere else.

The twenty years from 1228 to 1248 saw the most massive advance in the reconquista yet. In this great sweep, most of the great old citadels of al-Andalus fell one by one. Ferdinand III took the lion's share of the spoils – Badajoz and Mérida (which had fallen to the Leonese), were promptly inherited by Ferdinand in 1230; then by his own effort, Cazorla in 1231, Úbeda in 1233, the old Umayyad capital of Córdoba in 1236, Niebla and Huelva in 1238, Écija and Lucena in 1240, Orihuela and Murcia in 1243 (by the famous 'pact of Alcaraz'), Arjona, Mula and Lorca in 1244, Cartagena in 1245, Jaén in 1246, Alicante in 1248 and finally, on 22 December 1248, Ferdinand III entered as a conqueror in Seville, the greatest of Andalusian cities. At the end of this twenty-year onslaught, only a rump Andalusian state, the Emirate of Granada, remained unconquered (and even so, Ferdinand III managed to extract a tributary arrangement from Granada in 1238).

Ferdinand annexed some of his conquests directly into the Crown of Castile, and others were initially received and organized as vassal states under Muslim governors (e.g. Alicante, Niebla, Murcia), although they too were eventually permanently occupied and absorbed into Castile before the end of the century (Niebla in 1262, Murcia in 1264, Alicante in 1266). Outside of these vassal states, Christian rule could be heavy-handed on the new Muslim subjects. The range of Castilian conquests also sometimes transgressed into the spheres of interest of other conquerors. Thus, along the way, Ferdinand III took care to carefully negotiate with the other Christian kings to avoid conflict, e.g. the treaty of Almizra (26 March 1244) which delineated the Murcian boundary with James I of Aragon.

Ferdinand divided the conquered territories between the Knights, the Church, and the nobility, whom he endowed with great latifundia. When he took Córdoba, he ordered the Liber Iudiciorum to be adopted and observed by its citizens, and caused it to be rendered, albeit inaccurately, into Castilian.

The capture of Córdoba was the result of a well-planned and executed process whereby parts of the city (the Ajarquía) first fell to the independent almogavars of the Sierra Morena to the north, which Ferdinand had not at the time subjugated. Only in 1236 did Ferdinand arrive with a royal army to take the Medina, the religious and administrative centre of the city. Ferdinand set up a council of partidores to divide the conquests and between 1237 and 1244 a great deal of land was parcelled out to private individuals and members of the royal family as well as to the Church. On 10 March 1241, Ferdinand established seven outposts to define the boundary of the province of Córdoba. Following his conquest of Cordoba, Pope Gregory IX hailed Ferdinand as an "athleta Christi"(champion of Christ) and ordered bishops in Castile and Leon to provide him with 20,000 gold pieces a year, for three years.

== Domestic policy ==
On the domestic front, Ferdinand strengthened the University of Salamanca and erected the current Cathedral of Burgos. He was a patron of the newest movement in the Church, that of the mendicant Orders. Whereas the Benedictine monks, and then the Cistercians and Cluniacs, had taken a major part in the Reconquista up until then, Ferdinand founded houses for friars of the Dominican, Franciscan, Trinitarian, and Mercedarian Orders throughout Andalusia, thus determining the future religious character of that region. Ferdinand has also been credited with sustaining the convivencia in Andalusia. He himself joined the Third Order of St. Francis, and is honored in that Order.

He took care not to overburden his subjects with taxation, fearing, as he said, the curse of one poor woman more than a whole army of Saracens.

== Death ==
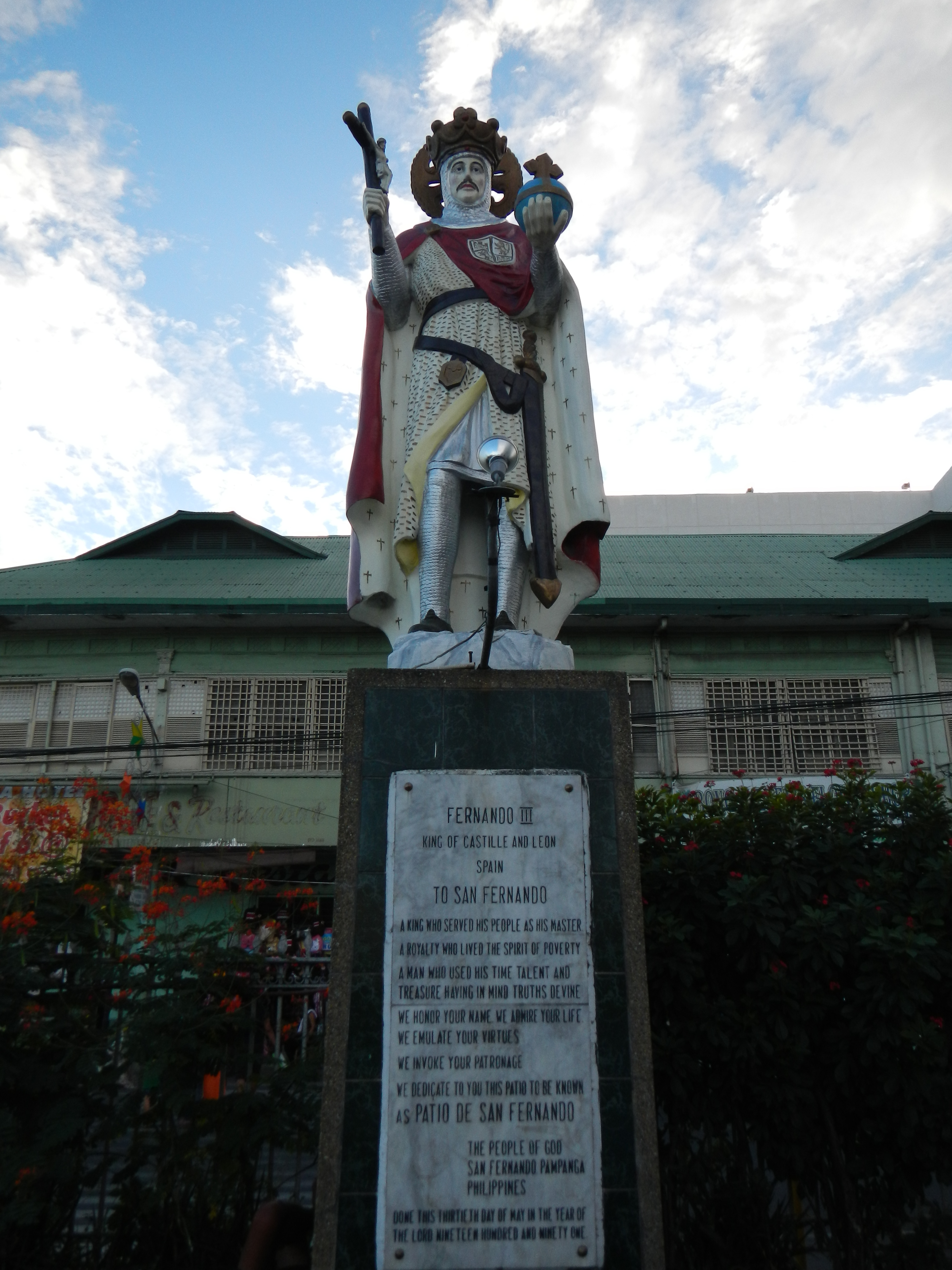
Statue of Ferdinand III (Patio of Metropolitan Cathedral of San Fernando in the Philippines)

Ferdinand III had started out as a contested king of Castile. By the time of his death he had delivered to his son and heir, Alfonso X, a massively expanded kingdom. The boundaries of the new Castilian state established by Ferdinand III remained nearly unchanged until the late 15th century. His biographer, Sister María del Carmen Fernández de Castro Cabeza, A.C.J., asserts that, on his deathbed, Ferdinand said to his son "you will be rich in land and in many good vassals, more than any other king in Christendom."

Ferdinand's death was attributed to a dropsy he contracted in the winter of 1251. His death took place on 30 May 1252, and he was buried in the Cathedral of Seville by his son, Alfonso X. The funeral took place on 1 June 1252 and was officiated by Remondo, Bishop of Segovia, in the cathedral. In the city there were royal vassals, bishops, abbots and wealthy men of the kingdom, who had come to show their lament. His tomb was inscribed in four languages: Arabic, Hebrew, Latin, and an early version of Castilian.

He was canonized as Saint Ferdinand by Pope Clement X in 1671. Today, the incorrupt body of Saint Ferdinand can still be seen in the Cathedral of Seville, for he rests enclosed in a gold and crystal casket worthy of the king. His golden crown still encircles his head as he reclines beneath the statue of the Virgin of the Kings. Several places named San Fernando were founded across the Spanish Empire in his honor. His supposed likeliness, enthronement, sword and orb are depicted on the coat of arms of Seville and the crest of Sevilla Fútbol Club.

The symbol of his power as a king was his sword Lobera.

== Patronage ==
Saint Ferdinand III
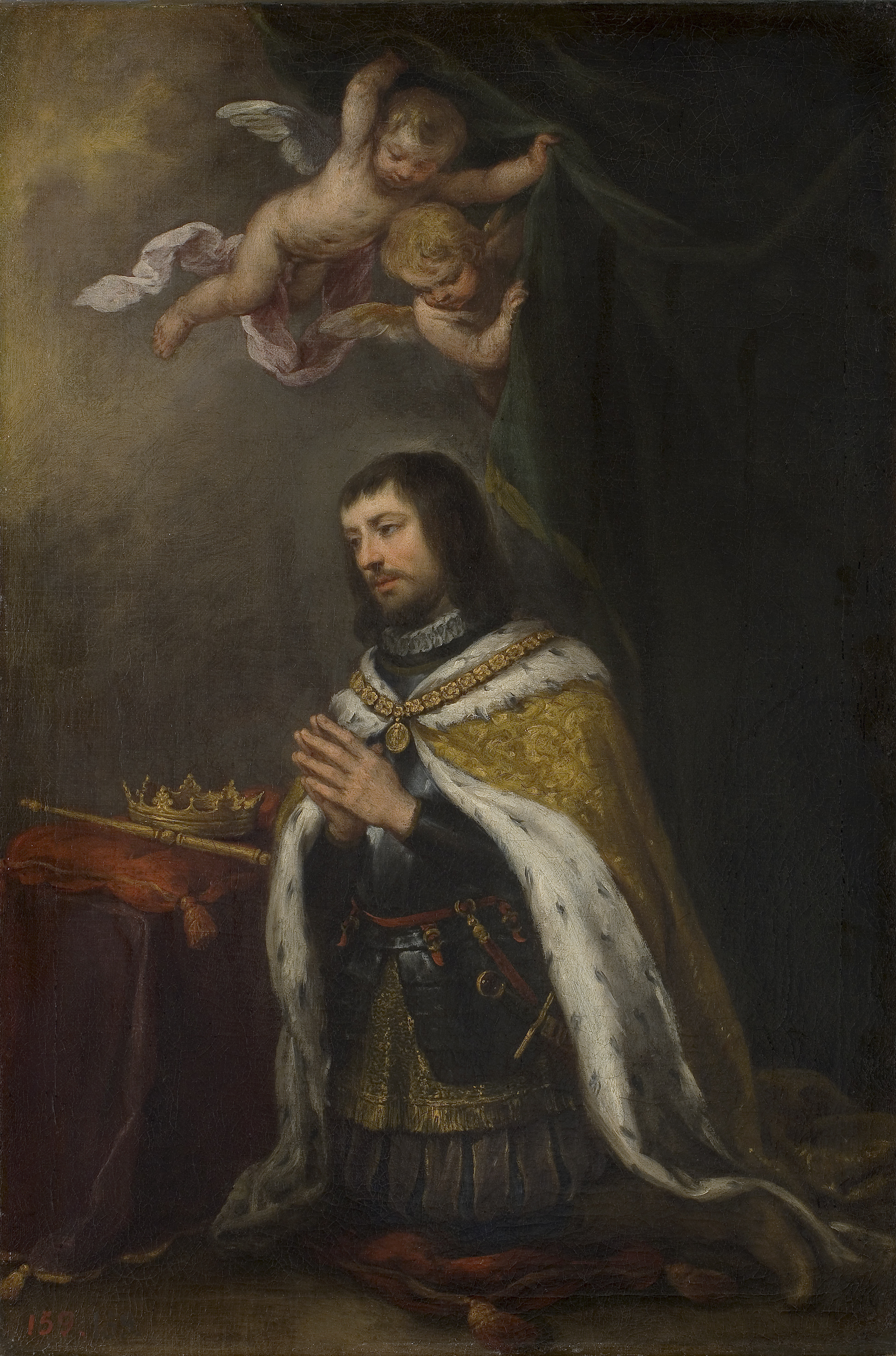
- Painting of St. Ferdinand III by Bartolomé Esteban Murillo (17th century)
- Honored in: Catholic Church
- Canonized: 4 February 1671 by Pope Clement X
- Feast: May 30
- Patronage: Cities: Seville, Aranjuez, San Fernando de Henares, Maspalomas, Pivijay; Military: Spanish Army's Corps of Engineers

Saint Ferdinand is the patron saint of Seville, Aranjuez, San Fernando de Henares, Maspalomas, Pivijay, and of several other localities. He is also the patron of the Spanish Army's Corps of Engineers, and engineers generally.

Since the establishment in 1819 of the Diocese of San Cristóbal de La Laguna, also called "Diocese of Tenerife" (Canary Islands), Saint Ferdinand is the co-patron of the diocese and of its Cathedral pursuant to the papal bull issued by Pope Pius VII. This is because La Laguna is a suffragan diocese of the Archdiocese of Seville whose capital city has Saint Ferdinand as one of its co-patrons, together with the Virgen de los Reyes. Saint Ferdinand is also the patron of the University of La Laguna, since this institution was founded under the name of Universidad Literaria de San Fernando (Literary University of Saint Ferdinand).

== Family ==
=== First marriage ===
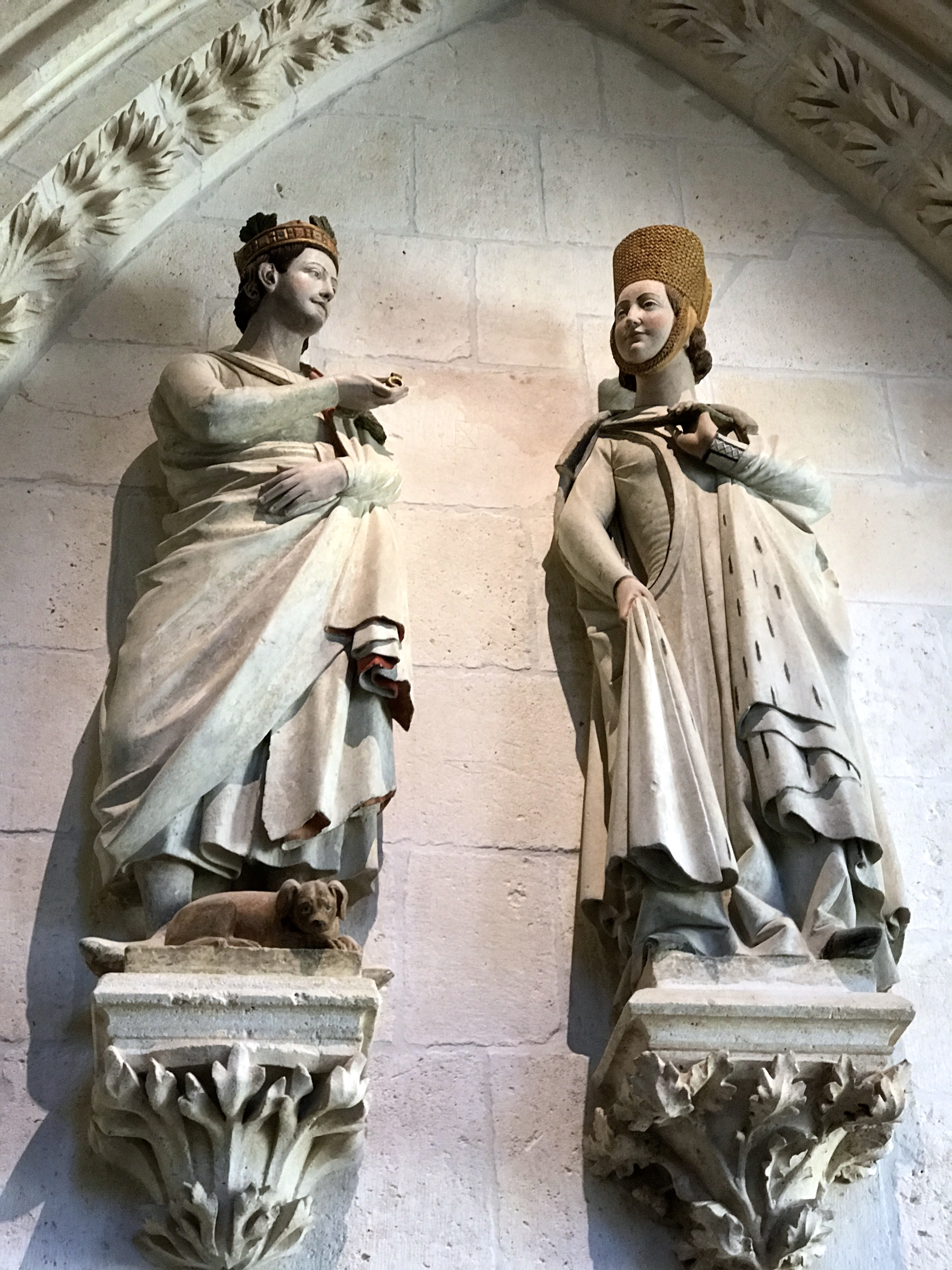
King Ferdinand and his wife, Beatrice, depicted in the Burgos Cathedral

In 1219, Ferdinand married Elisabeth of Swabia (1203–1235). (Note: Elisabeth changed her name to Beatrice after her sister's death in 1212.) She was the fourth daughter of Philip, Duke of Swabia, and Irene Angelina. Their children were:

1. Alfonso X (1221–1284), his successor
2. Frederick (1223–1277)
3. Ferdinand (1225–1243/1248)
4. Eleanor (born 1227), died young
5. Berengaria (1228–1288/89), a nun at Las Huelgas
6. Henry (1230–1303)
7. Philip (1231–1274). He was promised to the Church, but was so taken by the beauty of Christina of Norway, daughter of Haakon IV of Norway, who had been intended as a bride for one of his brothers, that he abandoned his holy vows and married her. She died in 1262, childless.
8. Sancho, Archbishop of Toledo and Seville (1233–1261)
9. Manuel of Castile (1234–1283)
10. Maria, died an infant in November 1235

=== Second marriage ===
After he was widowed, he married Joan, Countess of Ponthieu, before August 1237. They had four sons and one daughter:

1. Ferdinand (1238–1264/1269), Count of Aumale
2. Eleanor (c. 1241–1290), married Edward I of England.
3. Louis (1243–1269)
4. Simon (1244), died young and buried in a monastery in Toledo
5. John (1245), died young and buried at the cathedral in Córdoba

== See also ==
- San Fernando (disambiguation)

== Sources ==
- Ansón, Francisco (1998). Fernando III: Rey de Castilla y León (in Spanish). Palabra. ISBN 978-84-8239-233-2.
- Bianchini, Janna (2012). The Queen's Hand: Power and Authority in the Reign of Berenguela of Castile. University of Pennsylvania Press. ISBN 978-0-8122-0626-5.
- Bianchini, Janna (2019). "The 'Infantazgo' in the Reign of Alfonso VIII". In Smith, Damian J.; Lincoln, Kyle C.; Gómez, Miguel (eds.). King Alfonso VIII of Castile: Government, Family, and War. Fordham University Press. pp. 59–79.
- Brewer, Ebenezer Cobham. Brewer's Dictionary of Phrase and Fable. New York: Harper and Bros.
- Edwards, John (2001). Christian Córdoba: The City and Its Region in the Late Middle Ages. University of Central Arkansas.
- Emmerson, Richard K., ed. (2013). Key Figures in Medieval Europe: An Encyclopedia. Taylor & Francis. ISBN 978-1-136-77518-5.
- Ezquerra, Jaime Alvar, ed. (2001). Diccionario de historia de España. Ediciones AKAL. ISBN 978-84-7090-366-3.
- Fernández de Castro Cabeza, María del Carmen (1988). The Life of the Very Noble King of Castile and León, Saint Ferdinand III. Mount Kisco, N.Y.: The Foundation for a Christian Civilization, Inc. ISBN 978-1877905094.
- Fitzhenry, James (2009). "Saint Fernando III, A Kingdom for Christ". Catholic Vitality Publications.
- González, Julio. Reinado y Diplomas de Fernando III, i: Estudio. 1980.
- Heckmann, Ferdinand (1909). "St. Ferdinand III" . In Herbermann, Charles (ed.). Catholic Encyclopedia. Vol. 6. New York: Robert Appleton Company.
- Houben, Hubert (2023). "How did the Teutonic Knights finance the construction of Montfort castle". In Khamisy, Rabei G.; Lewis, Rafael Y.; Shotten-Hallel, Vardit R. (eds.). Exploring Outremer Volume I: Studies in Medieval History in Honour of Adrian. Routledge. pp. 59–86.
- Johnstone, Hilda (1914). "The County of Ponthieu, 1279–1307". The English Historical Review. 29 (115). Oxford University Press: 435–452. doi:10.1093/ehr/XXIX.CXV.435. JSTOR 551121. Zenodo: 1793255.
- Kinkade, Richard P. (2019). Dawn of a Dynasty: The Life and Times of Infante Manuel of Castile. University of Toronto Press.
- Linehan, Peter (2008). Spain, 1157-1300: A Partible Inheritance. Wiley.
- Menocal, Maria Rosa (2009). The Ornament of the World: How Muslims, Jews, and Christians Created a Culture of Tolerance in Medieval Spain. Boston: Little, Brown. ISBN 978-0-316-09279-1.
- O'Callaghan, Joseph F. (2004). Reconquest and Crusade in Medieval Spain. University of Pennsylvania Press.
- Powicke, Frederick Maurice (1991). The Thirteenth Century, 1216–1307. Oxford University Press.
- Reilly, Bernard F. (1993). The Medieval Spains. Cambridge University Press. ISBN 978-0-521-39741-4.
- Shadis, Miriam (1999), "Berenguela of Castile's Political Motherhood", in Parsons, John Carmi; Wheeler, Bonnie (eds.), Medieval Mothering, New York: Taylor & Francis, ISBN 978-0-8153-3665-5
- Shadis, Miriam (2010). Berenguela of Castile (1180–1246) and Political Women in the High Middle Ages. Palgrave Macmillan. ISBN 978-0-312-23473-7.
- Saint Ferdinand at the Christian Iconography web site

Ferdinand III of Castile Castilian House of Ivrea Cadet branch of the House of Ivrea Born: 5 August 1201 Died: 30 May 1252
Regnal titles
Preceded by Berengaria	King of Castile and Toledo; 1217–1252	Succeeded by Alfonso X
Preceded by Alfonso IX	King of León and Galicia; 1230–1252	Succeeded by Alfonso X
Preceded by Abdul-Wahid II	King of Córdoba; 1237–1252	Succeeded by Alfonso X
Preceded by Abu Bakr Muhammad	King of Murcia; 1241–1252	Succeeded by Alfonso X
Preceded by Muhammad ibn al-Ahmar	King of Jaén; 1246–1252	Succeeded by Alfonso X
Preceded by Ali	King of Seville; 1248–1252	Succeeded by Alfonso X
Preceded by Simon	Count of Aumale; 1239–1252 with Joan	Succeeded by Joan as sole ruler
Preceded by Marie	Count of Ponthieu; 1251–1252 with Joan	Succeeded by Joan as sole ruler
