= Lobera (sword) =

Sword of Saint Ferdinand III

Lobera, sword of Ferdinand III the Saint, Cathedral of Seville

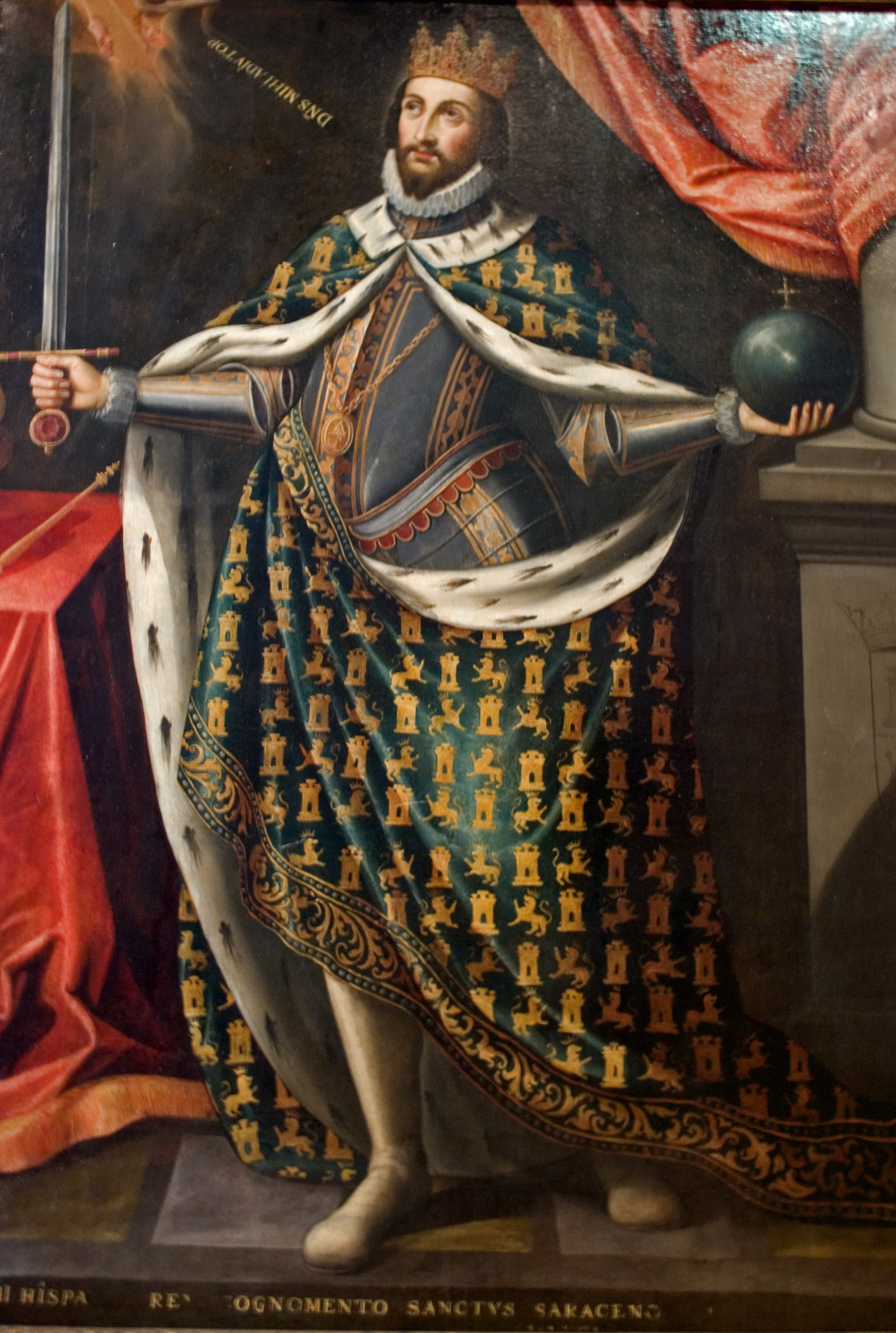
King Ferdinand III of Castile depicted with Lobera

The sword Lobera (Spanish: la espada lobera, literally: "the wolf-slaying sword") was the symbol of power used by Saint Ferdinand III of Castile, instead of the more traditional rod, and so the king will be depicted with orb and sword in hand.

== History ==
Lobera was the sword of Saint Ferdinand III, King of Castile from 1217 and King of León from 1230, He finished the work done by his maternal grandfather Alfonso VIII of Castile and consolidated the Reconquista. In 1231, he permanently united Castile and León. He was considered an exemplary knight in his time. Pope Innocent IV named him "invincible champion of Jesus Christ". The sword along with Ferdinand's orb and Ferdinand himself are depicted on the crest badge of Sevilla Fútbol Club.

== Etymology ==
Lobera is a Spanish word meaning wolf huntress.

== Legend ==
Don Juan Manuel, Prince of Villena, grandson of King Ferdinand III, wrote in his Libro de los ejemplos del conde Lucanor y de Patronio (1337) ("Book of the examples of Count Lucanor and of Patronio"), that Lobera was the sword of Fernán González of Castile (epic hero from the Poem of Fernán González) and a "sword of great virtue". Don Juan Manuel writes that King Ferdinand III, lying on his deathbed, addressed him in these words: "I can bequeath no heritage to you, but I bestow upon you my sword Lobera, that is of passing worth, and wherewith God has wrought much good to me." .

== Description ==
Lobera, forged in steel, has a blade of 80 cm. (31.5 inches) and silver ornaments. It is a relic kept in the Capilla Real at the Seville Cathedral.
