= Elisabeth of Swabia =

Queen of Castile from 1219 to 1235

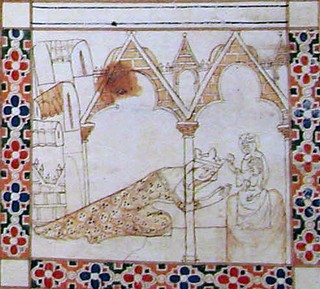
- Queen Beatrice being cured of an illness by the Virgin Mary, Cantigas de Santa Maria

Queen consort of Castile
- Tenure: 30 November 1219 – 5 November 1235
- Born: March or May 1205; Nuremberg
- Died: 5 November 1235 (aged 30); Toro
- Burial: Seville Cathedral
- Spouse: Ferdinand III of Castile
- Issue: Alfonso X, King of Castile; Frederick of Castile; Henry the Senator; Philip, Lord of Valdecorneja; Sancho, Archbishop of Seville; Manuel, Lord of Villena
- House: Hohenstaufen
- Father: Philip of Swabia
- Mother: Irene Angelina

Elisabeth of Swabia (renamed Beatrice; March/May 1205 – 5 November 1235), was a member of the House of Hohenstaufen who became Queen of Castile and Leon by marriage to Ferdinand III.

Born in Nürnberg, Elisabeth was the fourth daughter of Philip of Swabia, King of Germany, and Irene Angelina, daughter of Emperor Isaac II Angelos of the Byzantine Empire. Elisabeth's father was murdered on 21 June 1208, and her mother died from childbirth complications on 27 August. Elisabeth and her sisters were placed under the guardianship of their cousin, King Frederick Roger of Sicily, who arranged the marriage of Elisabeth and King Ferdinand III of Castile.

The marriage ceremony between Elisabeth and Ferdinand III was celebrated on 30 November 1219 in the city of Burgos. In Castile, she assumed the name Beatrice, probably in honour to both her eldest sister, Empress Beatrice (who had died in 1212), and the youngest, who died alongside their mother in 1208 during childbirth.

In 1230, after the death of her father-in-law, King Alfonso IX of Leon, Beatrice became queen. During her marriage, Elisabeth gave birth to ten children:

- Alfonso X (called the Wise) (b. Toledo, 23 November 1221 - d. Seville, 4 April 1284).
- Frederick (b. Guadalajara, bef. 15 September 1223 - executed in Burgos, 1277).
- Ferdinand (b. Cuenca, bef. 27 March 1225 - d. near Seville, bef. 23 November 1248).
- Eleanor (b. 1226 - died young).
- Berengaria (b. 1228 - d. Las Huelgas 1279), a nun at the Cistercian monastery Santa María la Real at Las Huelgas since September 1243.
- Henry (b. bef. 10 March 1230 - d. Roa, 8 August 1303).
- Philip (b. bef. 5 Dec 1231 - d. 28 November 1274).
- Sancho (b. 1233 - d. Toledo, 27 October 1261), Archbishop of Toledo from 1251–1261.
- Manuel, Lord of Villena (b. Carrión de los Condes, 1234 - d. Peñafiel, 25 December 1283).
- Maria (b. and d. bef. 5 November 1235).

Queen Beatrice died in Toro on 5 November 1235 aged 30. Her death was probably related to her last childbirth, or she even died after giving birth. She was buried in the Royal Monastery of Huelgas de Burgos, next to King Henry I. Later, her son Alfonso X transferred her body to Seville Cathedral in 1279, where that of her husband rested.

== Resources ==
- Arch and Garay, Ricardo (1954). Jerónimo Zurita Institute. National Research Council .. ed. Graves of the royal house of Castile. Madrid.
- Elorza, Juan C.; Lourdes Vaquero, Belen Castillo, Martha Black (1990). Castilla y Leon. Ministry of Culture and Social Welfare. ed. Pantheon Real de las Huelgas de Burgos. The tombs of the kings of León and Castile (2nd edition). Editorial Evergráficas SA. ISBN 84-241-9999-5 .
- Gomez Moreno, Manuel. Diego Velazquez Institute. National Research Council .. ed.'s Pantheon Royal Huelgas de Burgos. Madrid.

Elisabeth of Swabia House of Hohenstaufen Born: 1203 Died: 5 November 1235
Royal titles
Preceded by Mafalda of Portugal	Queen consort of Castile; 1219–1235	Succeeded by Joan of Ponthieu
Preceded by Berengaria of Castile	Queen consort of León; 1219–1235	Succeeded by Joan of Ponthieu
