= Leonor Rodríguez de Castro =

Infanta of the Kingdom of Castile

- Died: 1275; Santa Olalla
- Burial: Convent of San Felices de Amaya
- Spouse: Infante Philip of Castile
- House: House of Castro
- Father: Rodrigo Ponce de Castro
- Mother: Leonor González de Lara

Leonor Rodríguez de Castro (died after 20 December 1275) was an infanta of the Kingdom of Castile as the third wife of Philip of Castile.

== Biography ==
Her parents were Rodrigo Fernández de Castro, Lord of Cigales, Mucientes, and Santa Olalla and Leonor González de Lara. She was buried in the Convent of San Felices de Amaya, a convent of the Order of Calatrava, currently in a state of ruin, in the province of Burgos, where her only son is also buried.

== Marriage and children ==
In 1269, she married Philip of Castile, brother of King Alfonso X, who died in 1274, one year before Leonor. They were the parents of:

- Philip of Castile. He died in childhood and was buried in the Convent of San Felices de Amaya.
- Beatriz Fernández of Castile (? – 1340). Infanta Blanche, daughter of Alfonso III of Portugal and granddaughter of Alfonso X bequeathed her the sum of 2000 maravedís in her will dated 15 April 1321. She appears often in the charters of the Abbey of Santa María la Real de Las Huelgas, in Burgos where she was a nun. On 23 January 1295 she made a donation of the village of San Cristobal del Monte to the council of Belorado, mentioning that it had been given to her by King Sancho IV and declaring herself daughter of Philip of Castile.

== Bibliography ==
- Arco y Garay, Ricardo del (1954). Sepulcros de la Casa Real de Castilla (in Spanish). Madrid: Instituto Jerónimo Zurita. Consejo Superior de Investigaciones Científicas. OCLC 11366237.
- Blanco García, Flor (1972). "Catalogación de documentos medievales de la Rioja Burgalesa (5)". Boletín de la Institución Fernán González (in Spanish) (179). Burgos: Institución Fernán González: 376–389. ISSN 0211-8998. Archived from the original on 2013-10-24.
- Fernández-Xesta y Vázquez, Ernesto (2001). Relaciones del condado de Urgel con Castilla y León (in Spanish). Madrid: E&P Libros Antiguos, S.L. ISBN 84-87860-37-0.
- Huidobro y Serna, Luciano (1942). "Convento de Religiosas de San Felices, orden de Calatrava de Burgos" (PDF). Boletín de la Comisión Provincial de Monumentos Histórios y Artísticos de Burgos (in Spanish) (79). Burgos: 45–49. ISSN 1133-9276. Archived from the original (PDF) on 2013-10-29.
- Rubio Salán, Antonio (1952). "Breve noticia de Villalcazar de Sirga y de su Templo". Publicaciones de la Institución Tello Téllez de Meneses (in Spanish). No. 8. Palencia: Institución Tello Téllez de Meneses. pp. 27–48. ISSN 0210-7317.
