= Villalcázar de Sirga =

Coordinates: 42°19′N 4°32′W

- municipality
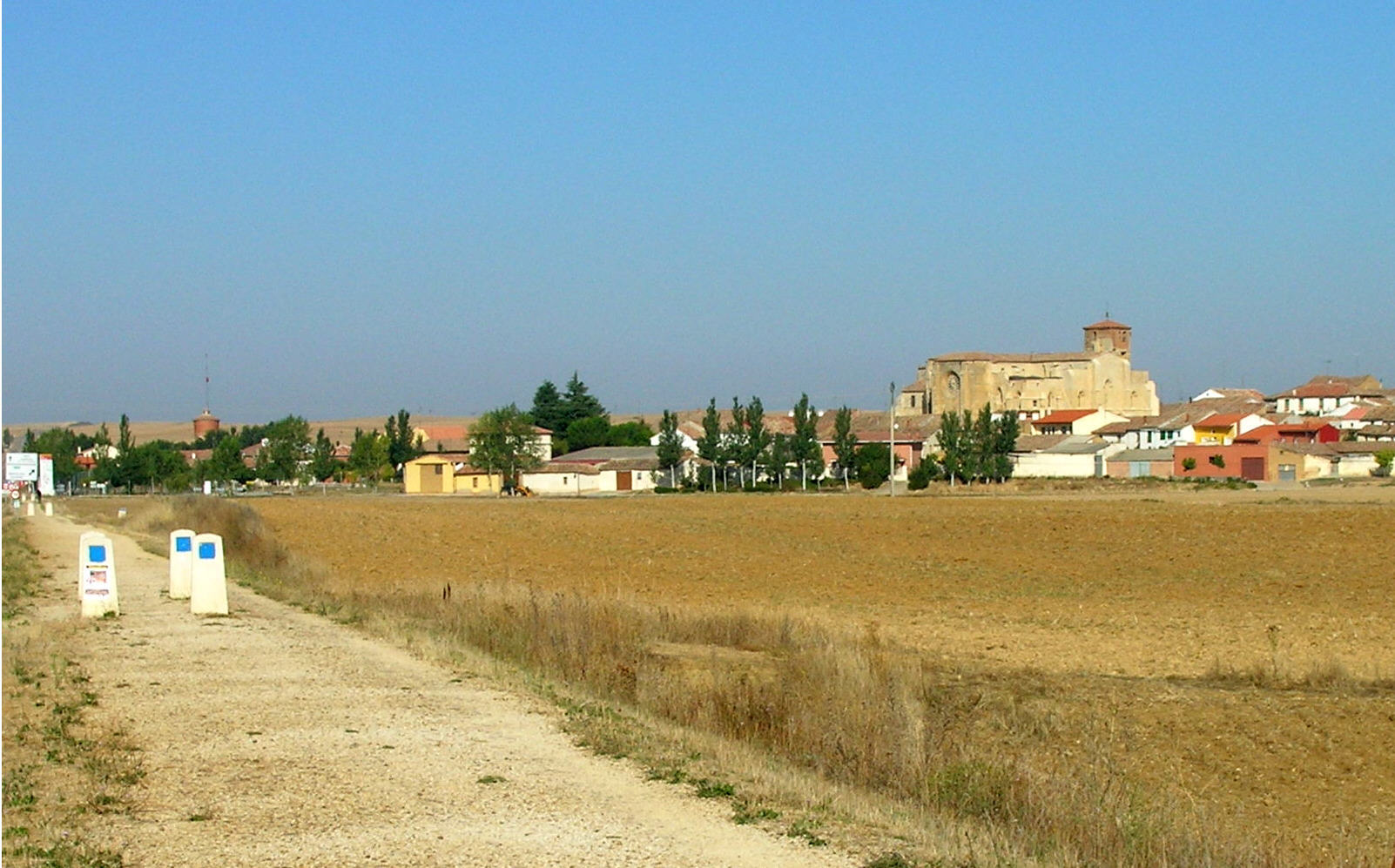

- Flag Coat of arms
- Interactive map of Villalcázar de Sirga
- Country: Spain
- Autonomous community: Castile and León
- Province: Palencia
- Municipality: Villalcázar de Sirga

Area
  - Total: 25 km^{2} (9.7 sq mi)

Population (2025-01-01)
  - Total: 160
  - Density: 6.4/km^{2} (17/sq mi)
- Time zone: UTC+1 (CET)
  - Summer (DST): UTC+2 (CEST)
- Website: Official website

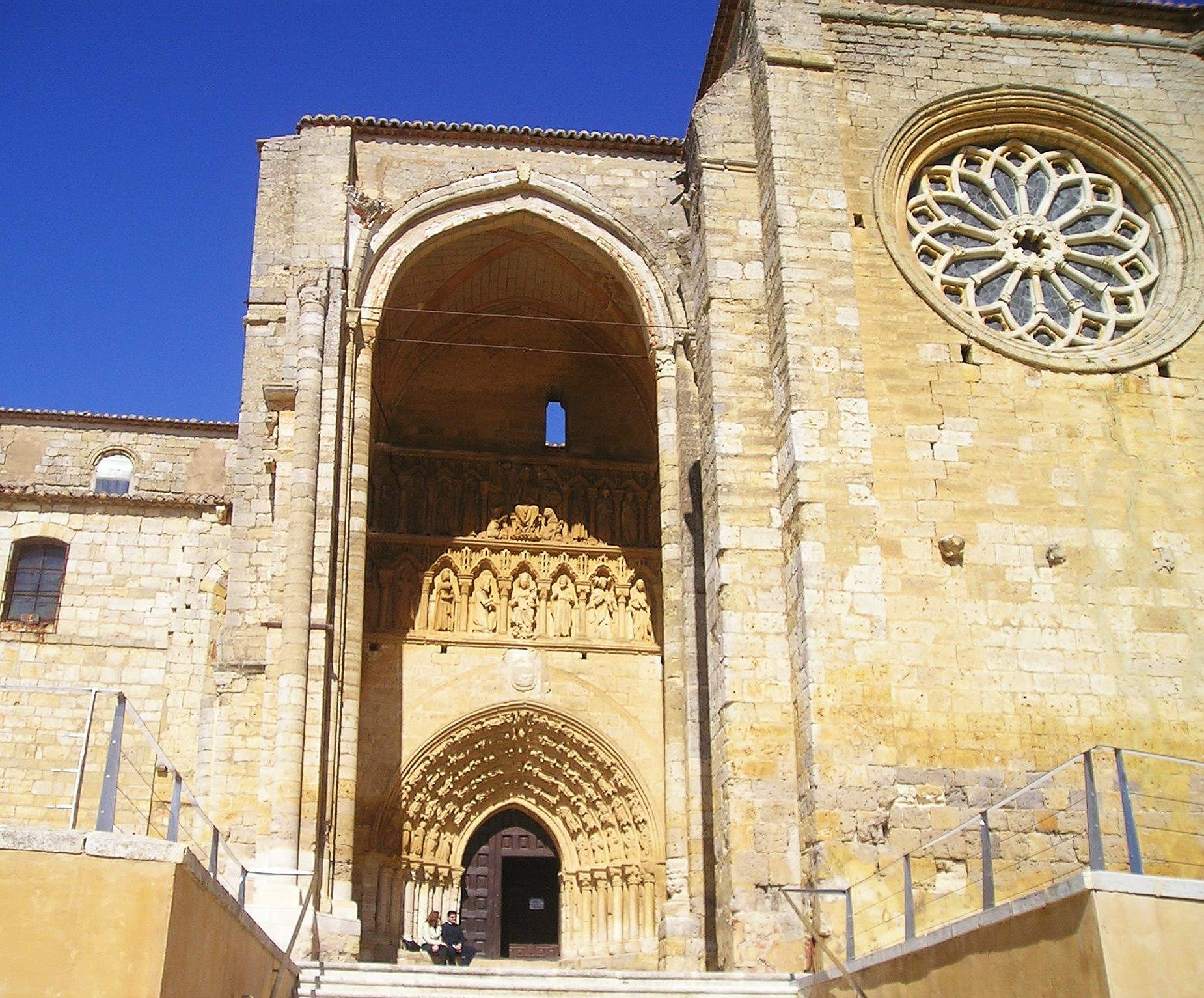
The church of the Virgin of Villasirga

Villalcázar de Sirga is a municipality located in the province of Palencia, Castile and León, Spain. According to the 2004 census (INE), the municipality has a population of 216 inhabitants.

On the Camino Francés in medieval times the church of the Virgin of Villasirga was an important point on the route to Santiago de Compostela. Infante Philip of Castile and his second wife, Inés Rodríguez Girón, are buried in the church.
