= San Fernando Airport =

San Fernando Airport may refer to:

- San Fernando Airport (Argentina), serving San Fernando
- San Fernando Airport (Chile), serving San Fernando
- San Fernando Airport (Philippines), serving San Fernando City

== See also ==
- Las Flecheras Airport, serving San Fernando de Apure, Venezuela
