= Henry of Castile the Senator =

Castilian infante (1230–1303)

Henry of Castile
- Arms of Infante Henry of Castile.
- Born: March 1230
- Died: 8 August 1303 (aged 73)
- Burial: Monastery of San Francisco, Valladolid
- Spouse: Juana Núñez de Lara
- Issue: Enrique Enríquez de Sevilla (illegitimate)
- House: Castilian House of Ivrea
- Father: Ferdinand III of Castile
- Mother: Elisabeth of Swabia

Henry of Castile (March 1230 – 8 August 1303), called the Senator (el Senador), was a Castilian infante, the fourth son of Ferdinand III of Castile by his first wife, Beatrice of Swabia.

== Youth and rebellion ==
Henry spent his childhood at Burgos, where among his tutors was the future cardinal Giles of Torres. He received the typical education of a royal prince in both arms and letters.

In 1246, Henry accompanied his father on the expedition to Jaén. His father granted him in fief the first of the new conquests: Morón de la Frontera and Cote. After the fall of Seville, he was enfeoffed with more conquered towns: Jérez de la Frontera, Lebrija, Arcos and Medina Sidonia. In the repartimiento (division) of Seville itself, Henry and his retinue received a part. He spent the next few years mostly at Seville, often at the court of his father's second wife, Joan of Ponthieu. The troubadouric allusions to their illicit relationship are, however, of no evidentiary value.

As early as 1246, Henry had refused his father's request that he pay homage (homagium) to his elder brother, the future Alfonso X. After their father's death in 1252, Henry and his brother Frederick chafed under the rule of Alfonso. In March 1253, Alfonso withdrew the privileges which Ferdinand had granted Henry on his vast southern estates. He also interfered to prevent Henry from contracting an advantageous marriage. At Calatayud, according to the Libro de las armas of Juan Manuel, Henry's nephew, he asked for the hand in marriage of king of Aragon's daughter, Constance of Aragon, but Alfonso prevented it.

These insults induced Henry plot against Alfonso. In a meeting at Maluenda in 1255, Henry temporarily brought James I of Aragon over to his side. Finally, in October, leagued with Diego López IV de Haro, lord of Biscay, and drawing support from Galicia as well, he went into open rebellion. Despite an initial victory over troops of the royal party, he was defeated near Morón and forced to flee the country. He took ship at Cádiz and sailed through the Mediterranean, stopping at Valencia, and passed through France, initially seeking refuge with his stepmother in Ponthieu. She may have suggested he visit his half-sister Eleanor, who was married to Edward, the son and heir of King Henry III of England.

== English exile ==
Henry arrived at the English court in towards the middle of 1256. He lived comfortably there for three years entirely on King Henry's good graces, but the English offered him no political support. In the spring of 1257, Giovanni Colonna, archbishop of Messina and an ambassador from Pope Alexander IV, arrived in England to negotiate with the king the investiture of his second son, Edmund, with the Kingdom of Sicily. Henry offered to lead troops to Italy to conquer the kingdom for Edmund, but a rebellion in Wales diverted attention from these projects.

After several sojourns in France proved fruitless, Henry decided to seek his fortune in Africa, where the Hafsid emir of Tunis, Muhammad al-Mustansir, had carved out a large empire. After securing a vow that he would not attack Castile, the king of England let Henry leave for Tunisia in July 1259, even granting him a safeconduct through the Gascon ports under his control.

== Tunisian expedition ==
Henry sailed to Catalonia, but King James refused to allow any of his vassals to accompany Henry to Tunisia. In 1260, Henry arrived in Tunis, where his brother Frederick soon joined him. Henry took command of a contingent of Spanish knights in the service of al-Mustansir. In 1261, with the emir's brother, Abou Hafs, he led an attack on the desert city of Miliana. These campaigns strengthened Hafsid independence in the face of the Almohads, the Moroccan dynasty which had also ruled much of Spain the previous century.

In Tunis, Henry adopted the customs and dress of the Hafsid court, much to the shock of the local Christian community. He used the money he earned in the emir's service to finance commercial ventures originating out of the Genoese merchant colony in Tunis. From funds accrued through this trade, the king of France, Louis IX, was later able to make a loan to Henry of England.

== Italian campaigns ==
Henry later made his way to Italy, where he joined his cousin Charles of Anjou's campaign in 1266 to become King of Sicily (Battle of Benevento) and lent him large sums of money. It was here that Henry earned his title of El Senador when Charles had him made senator of Rome (at the time, the ancient Senate of Rome evolved into an institution where a single senator was entrusted with civil power in the city of Rome). However, he was never repaid by Charles; and Henry had aspired to the kingship of Sardinia or some other high title, and found the senatorship poor compensation.

As a result, when his cousin Conradin invaded Italy in 1268, Henry changed sides and joined him. He was one of Conradin's generals at the Battle of Tagliacozzo; he was in command of a host of three hundred Spanish knights sent by his brother Afonso X of Castille. He won the first encounter against the French, but was defeated by a surprise attack of a hidden reinforcement of one thousand French knights under Charles of Anjou. After the loss of the battle, he fled to the Convent of San Salvatore, Monte Cassino, where he was captured by the Angevins.

== Imprisonment ==
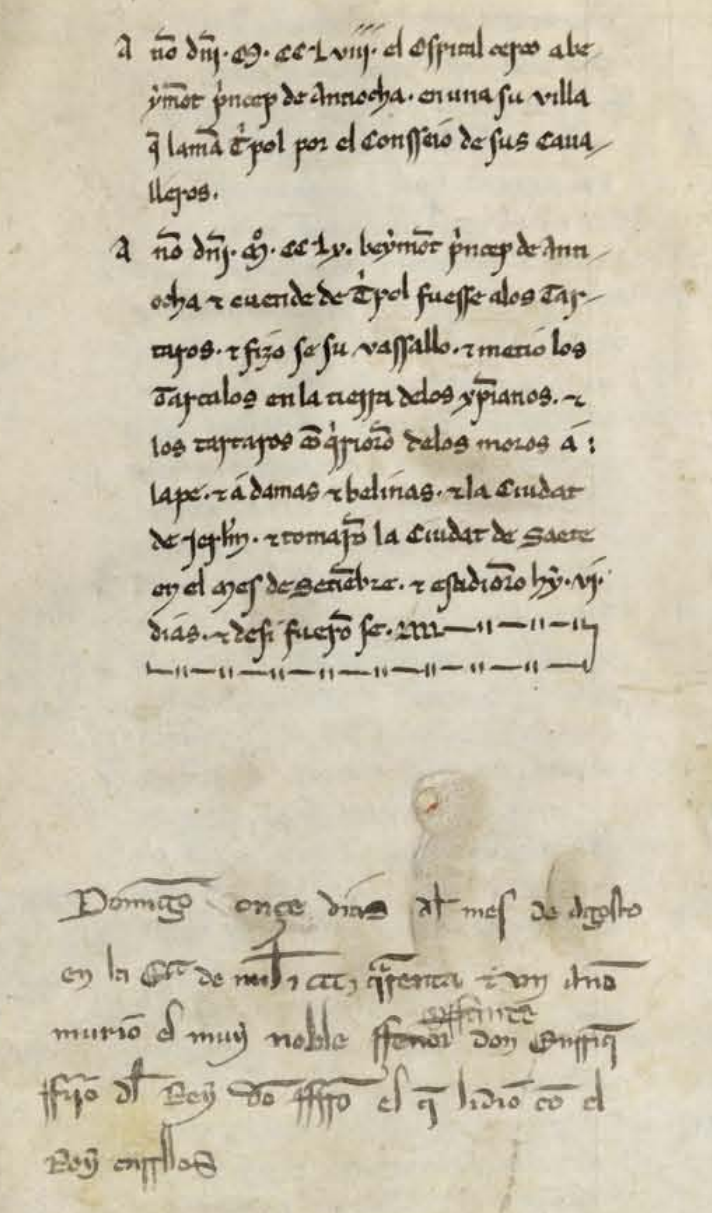
Final page of a contemporary copy of the Anales de Tierra Santa. The note at the bottom in a distinct hand is an obituary of Henry placing his death on 11 August in the year 1341 of the Spanish era (i.e., 1303)

According to Ferdinand Gregorovius he spent the next twenty-three years in captivity—in the castle of Canosa from 1268 to 1277, and in Castel del Monte from 1277 to 1291.

In 1272, his half-sister Eleanor and her husband King Edward I of England came to Sicily on return from the Crusades. Eleanor's attempts to get him released from prison were unsuccessful, but she kept in touch with him until her own death.

On 8 March 1286, Pope Honorius IV absolved him from the excommunication he had incurred when he had ravaged the city of Rome with Conradin, and committed insults and harm to Cardinal Giordano Orsini (the future Pope Nicholas III), his nephew Matteo Rosso Orsini, and Giordano Savelli. His absolution was conditional upon sacramental confession and restitution for all the damages done to interested parties, or, if he had insufficient means, a solemn promise to make full restitution when he was able.

Both Eleanor and Charles were dead before Henry was finally released in 1291. He returned to Castile in 1298, where he was appointed regent for his grandnephew, King Ferdinand IV. He married Juana Núñez de Lara, but had no known legitimate children before his death in 1304.

== Traditions ==
According to tradition he had a son out of wedlock with a lady called Mayor Rodríguez Pecha, daughter of the lord (Alcaide) of the castle of Zamora. This son was called Enrique Enriquez de Sevilla, who became Justicia Mayor or Chief Judge of Castile under King Alfonso XI.

A recent study attributes the cavalry novel "Amadis de Gaula" to Henry of Castile.

== Sources ==
- Kamp, Norbert (1993). "Enrico di Castiglia (Henricus de Castella, Henricus de Hispania, Arrigo di Castiglia, Anrricus, Don Enrrique)". Dizionario Biografico degli Italiani. Vol. 42. Rome: Istituto dell'Enciclopedia Italiana.
