= San Fernando, Catamarca =

San Fernando
- Municipality and village
- Map showing San Fernando in Argentina
- Coordinates: 27°20′0″S 66°55′0″W
- Country: Argentina
- Province: Catamarca Province
- Time zone: UTC−3 (ART)

San Fernando is a village and municipality located in the Catamarca Province in northwestern Argentina.
