= Frederick of Castile =

Infante of Castile (1223–1277)

- Infante of Castile
- Arms of Castile and León
- Born: 1223
- Died: 1277 (aged 54)
- House: Castilian House of Ivrea
- Father: Ferdinand III of Castile
- Mother: Elisabeth of Swabia

Frederick of Castile, in Spanish Fadrique (1223–1277), was a younger son (infante) of King Ferdinand III of Castile by his first wife, Elisabeth of Hohenstaufen. He was born in Guadalajara.

After the conquest of Seville, unhappy under the rule of his brother Alfonso, Frederick may have participated in the rebellion of his brother Henry in 1255; in any case, he was exiled from Castile in 1260 and joined Henry as a knight errant in Tunis serving under Sultan Al Mustansir against his enemies. Later, he joined the service of King Manfred of Sicily, and fought at the Battle of Benevento (1266). He escaped the defeat there and returned to Tunis. An anti-Angevin revolt in Sicily in 1267 provided an opportunity for him to cross over again, and he helped raise the island for Conradin, while Henry (now Senator of Rome) also declared for Conradin in Rome. He fought on in Sicily with Frederick Lancia after the defeat of Conradin in the battle of Tagliacozzo and the imprisonment of Henry in Canosa di Puglia, but they were forced to surrender at Agrigento in 1269. However, they were allowed to escape to Tunis again rather than being imprisoned. There they served the Tunisians against the soldiers of the Eighth Crusade (1270).

In 1272, Frederick was reconciled with Alfonso, returned to Castile, and became one of his advisors. In 1274 he married Catherine Angelina. He involved himself in a plot regarding the succession and was secretly executed by Alfonso in 1277.
