= Christina of Norway, Infanta of Castile =

Norwegian princess (1234–1262)

Christina of Norway
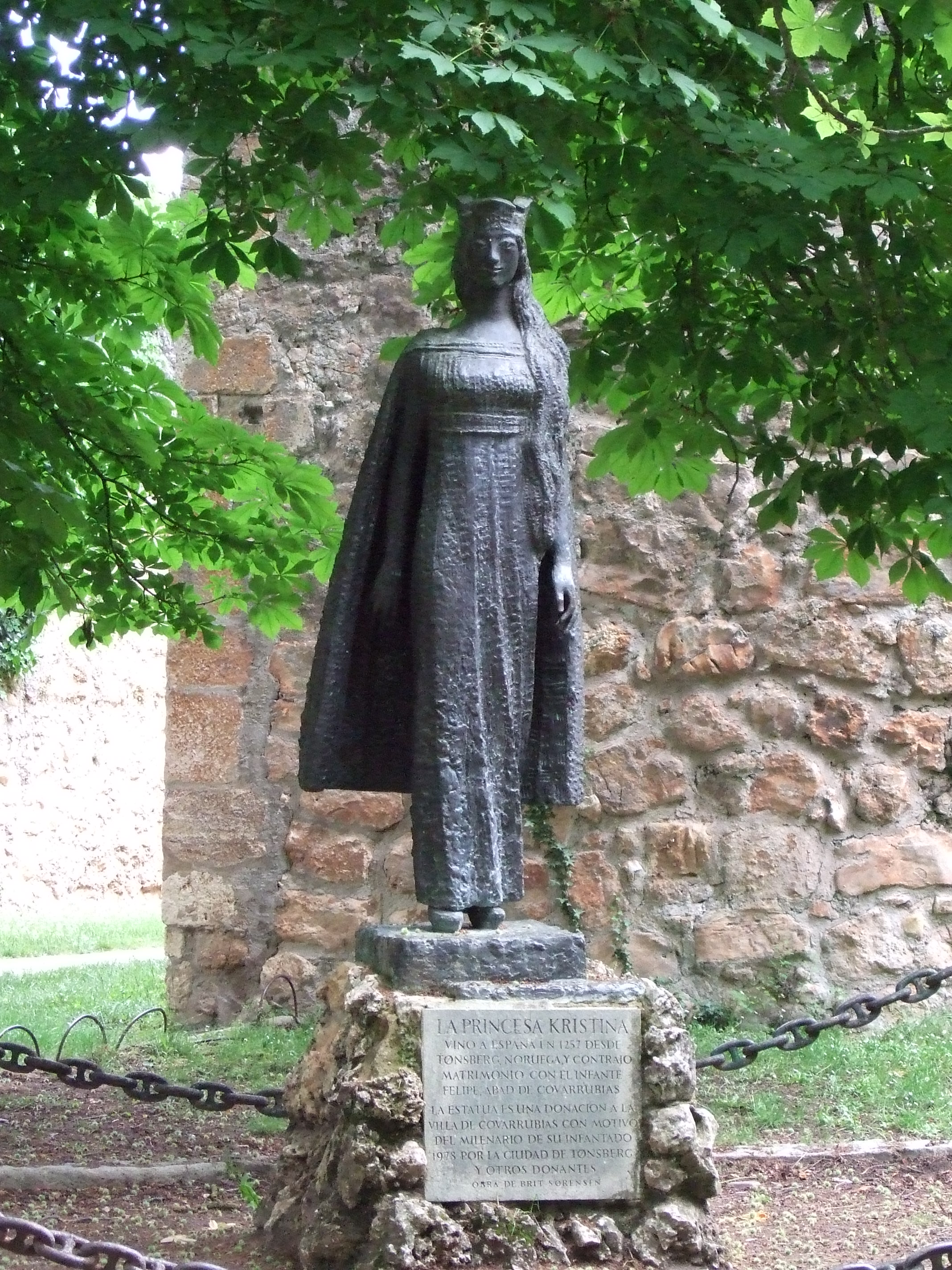
- Statue of Infanta Christina made by artist Brit Sørensen in Covarrubias, Spain, a copy was later erected in Tønsberg
- Born: 1234; Bergen, Norway
- Died: 1262 (aged 27–28); Seville, Castile
- Burial: Covarrubias, Castile
- Spouse: Infante Philip of Castile
- House: Sverre
- Father: Haakon IV of Norway
- Mother: Margaret Skulesdatter

Christina of Norway (Norwegian: Kristina Håkonsdotter; 1234 – 1262) was the daughter of Håkon IV and his wife, Margaret Skulesdatter. She was born in Bergen. As part of an alliance she was betrothed to Philip, brother of Alfonso X of Castile. They married in 1258, and she lived in Castile until her death four years later. Tradition states that Christina desired that a church dedicated to St Olaf should be built in Castile. 750 years later, "a modernized version of [a] simple pre-Roman church" was built and dedicated in Covarrubias, Spain.

== Medieval source ==
The primary source on Christina is that of Icelander Sturla Þórðarson (Sturla was a nephew of Snorri Sturluson and had come to Norway in 1263). Sturla was commissioned by Kristina's brother, Magnus Lagabøte, (King Magnus VI of Norway) to write his father's saga (Saga of Håkon Håkonsson ) shortly after King Håkon died in the Orkney Islands on 16 December 1263. In relating the stories in the saga, Sturla would have been able to interview contemporaries of the King and those that had taken the journey to Spain with Christina.

In the 19th century, Norwegian historian Peter Andreas Munch related the story of King Haakon's daughter, Christina, in his work, A History of the Norwegian People (Det norske folks historie), which was published in the 1850s.

The saga narrates how King Håkon sent a delegation to Castile in 1255 where they presented gifts to the court of falcons, furs, and leather. The Norwegian envoys were well received by the Spanish court and the next year when they returned to Norway, they were accompanied by representatives of Alfonso X, King of Castile, León and Galicia – headed by the royal notary, Sira Ferrant. Ferrant asked King Håkon if his daughter Christina could be betrothed to one of King Alfonso's brothers. The saga relates that King Håkon considered the request with careful thought. He consulted with the archbishop, and several wise men in making a decision. Håkon consented to the request under the condition that Christina be allowed to choose her husband from among the brothers of the King of Castile. (King Håkon had lost a son only a short time before to illness).

== The journey to Spain ==
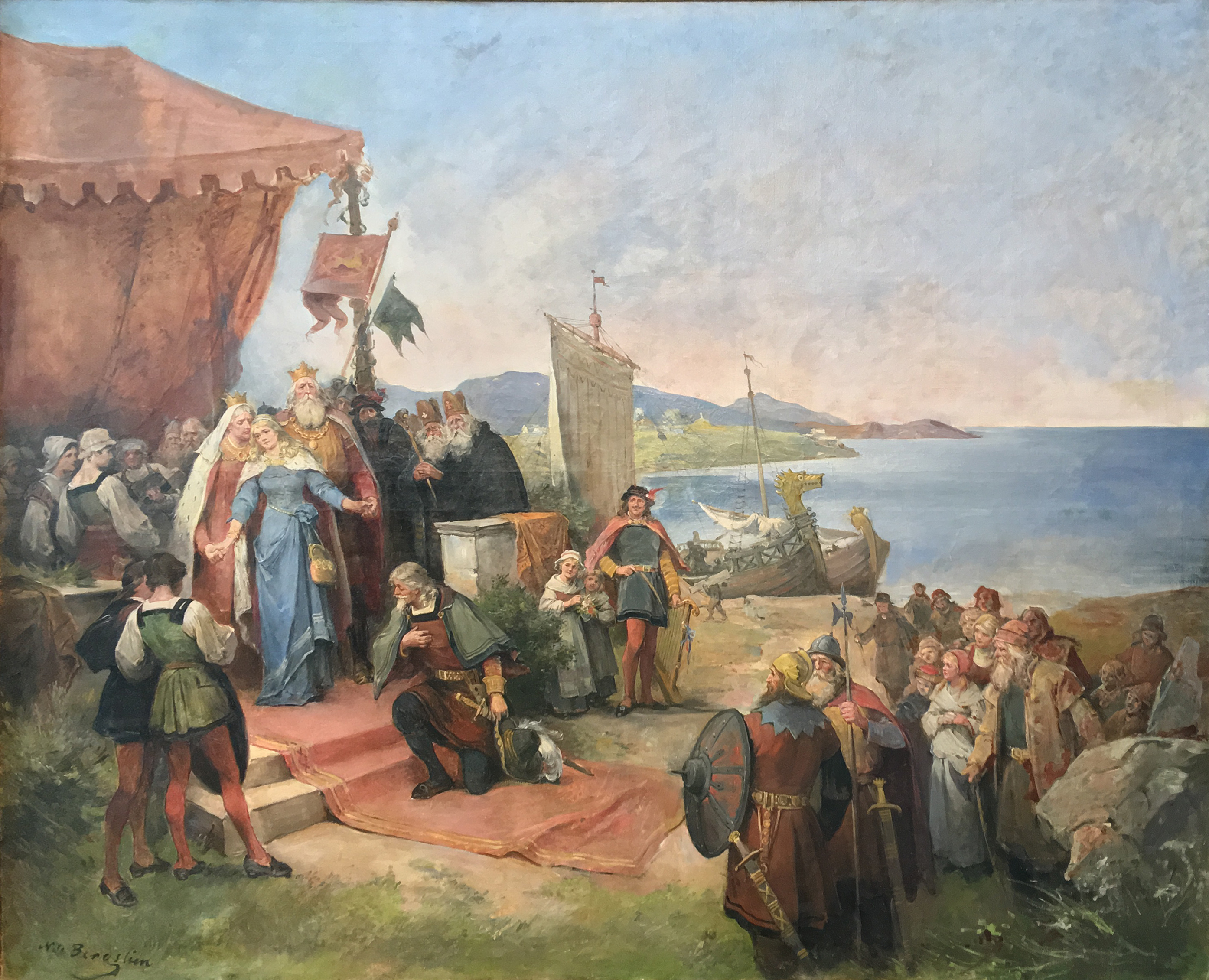
The history painting "Christina's departure to Spain" (in Norwegian: "Kristinas avreise til Spania") by Nils Bergslien(1853–1928) shows the princess leaving for Spain in 1257. The painting is on display in the public library in Tønsberg, Norway. Photo 2018.

Christina left Tønsberg, Norway in the Summer of 1257 – the procession consisting of more than 100 people. After crossing the North Sea to Yarmouth, England, they crossed the English Channel to Normandy – continuing their journey across France on horseback to the Spanish border of Catalonia. In Barcelona, the party was met by King James I of Aragon, (father of Violant of Aragon, wife of King Alfonso X), who was taken with Christina's beauty. On Christmas Eve, 1257, the party lodged at the Abbey of Santa María la Real de Las Huelgas at Burgos; an abbey that has survived intact to modern day.

At Palencia, the Norwegians were officially met by King Alfonso who accompanied them to the city of Valladolid on 3 January 1258, "where she was warmly welcomed by all the townspeople, the nobility, and the clergy who were gathered there for the Cortes". There she met the King's brothers for the first time, and ultimately chose the youngest, Philip, who was three years older than Christina. Although he had been trained for an ecclesiastical position and had charge of the church at Covarrubias, his greatest enjoyment was in hunting boars and bears. (Philip had been groomed by his father, Ferdinand III of Castile, for a life in the church and was subsequently rewarded with territories and properties (benefices) as part of this bargain, but after his father's death in 1252, Philip relinquished that role to the "chagrin" of Alfonso).

Infante Philip and Christina of Norway were married on 31 March 1258 in the Santa Maria la Mayor church (The Cathedral of Valladolid now exists on the site). There are not extant records that provide details about what the marriage was like. They did not have children, and just four years later, Christina died at the age of 28 in Seville.

Christina was carried to the abbey church in Covarrubias, Spain, which is 40 km (25 miles) south of Burgos. There, her wooden casket was placed within a simple limestone sarcophagus, ornamented with carved grape leaves.

== Tomb opened ==
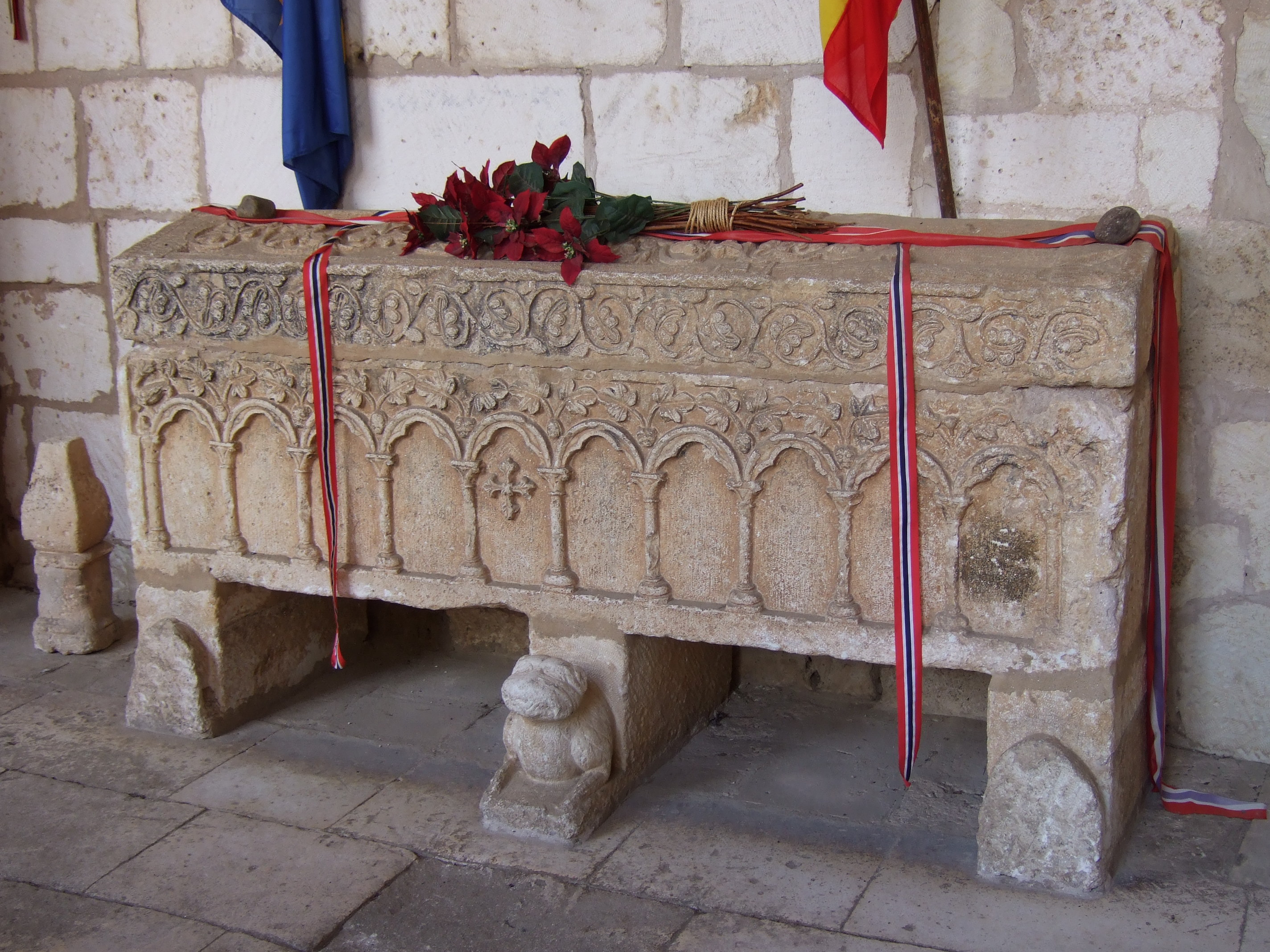
Tomb of the Infanta in the cloister of the collegiate church.

In 1952, her sarcophagus was opened by craftsmen while in the midst of doing restoration work. The parish priest at Covarrubias, Father Rufino Vargas Blanco, was shown a piece of written parchment that was found in the casket. The lid was replaced, later to be officially opened in 1958, partially based upon a 1757 church manuscript that indicated this as the resting place of Infanta Christina. (The year 1958 marked 700 years since the marriage had taken place).

Archaeologists and historians, Manuel Ayala and Jose Luis Monteverde, were employed to interpret the data. The limestone is from Hontoria. The fabrics within the casket were shown to be from the 13th century. The report by doctors Maximiliano Gutierrez and Gabriel Escudero stated:

A partially mummified skeleton with a length of 1.72 m (5 ft 8") – skull is small and all the teeth are well preserved with no evidence of caries...Everything points to a skeleton of a woman of high stature, young and strong...

== Legacy of saga ==
The cities of Tønsberg and Covarrubias have entered a friendship agreement as the result of this old connection. In 1978 a statue of Infanta Christina by artist Brit Sørensen was unveiled in Covarrubias and a copy was later placed in Tønsberg. The Princess Christina Foundation has been established to further the work to preserve and advance the cultural and historical ties.

Tradition states that Christina had desired for a church to be built in Spain dedicated to St Olaf. "A modernized version of the simple pre-Roman church", designed by architect Pablo López Aguado, has been built in Covarrubias, Spain. "Iceland, Liechtenstein and Norway have financed close to 40% of the total cost of the project. Local Spanish authorities as well as several Spanish and Norwegian companies are among the other contributors." 750 years later, a church was constructed and consecrated to Olav the Holy on 18 September 2011 in Covarrubias. Representatives from both Spain and Norway were present at the opening, as well as more than 1300 spectators. For several years now the area of Covarrubias has become a pilgrimage of sorts for visitors from Norway to visit the final resting place of a Norwegian daughter.
