= Family tree of Castilian monarchs =

The family tree of the Castilian monarchs of the Kingdom of Castile (1065–1230), in the historical region of Castile in Spain.

== Key ==
The colors denotes the monarchs from the: - House of Jiménez; - House of Burgundy; - House of Trastámara

—— The solid lines denotes the legitimate descents

– – – - The dashed lines denotes a marriage

· · · · The dotted lines denotes the liaisons and illegitimate descents

== Family tree ==
Houses of Jiménez, Burgundy, and Trastámara

García Sánchez II; King of Pamplona ?–c. 1004	Sancho García; Count of Castile ?–1017
Sancho III the Great; King of Pamplona; 990–1035	Muniadona; 995–1066	Urraca Garcés	Alfonso V the Noble; King of Galicia and León; 994–1028	Elvira Menéndez ?–1022
Ramiro I King of Aragon bef.1007–1063	García Sánchez III; King of Navarre; 1016–1054	Jimena Alfonso ?–aft.1037	Jimena Sánchez; 1012–1062	Bermudo III; King of Galicia and León; 1017–1037	Ferdinand I the Great; King of Castile and León; 1015–1065 r. 1037–1065	Sancha of León ?–1067
Sancho Garcés; Lord of Uncastillo c. 1038–1083	Alfonso	Alberta	Sancho II the Strong; King of Castile, Galicia, and León c. 1037–1072 r. 1065–1072	Urraca of Zamora; 1033/1034–1101	Elvira of Toro; 1038/1039–1101	García II; King of Galicia c. 1042–1090
Sancho V Ramírez; King of Navarre c. 1042–1094	Constance of Burgundy; 1046–1093	Agnes of Aquitaine; 1059–1078	Berta ?–c. 1100	Alfonso VI the Brave; King of Castile, Galicia, and León; 1040–1109 r. 1072–1109	Beatriz	Zaida of Seville; 1063–1101	Jimena Muñoz ?–1128
Alfonso I the Battler; King of Navarre; 1074–1134	Pedro González de Lara ?–1130	Urraca; Queen of León and Castile; 1079–1126 r. 1109–1126	Raymond of Burgundy; 1070–1107	Sancho Alfónsez c. 1093–1108	Elvira; 1100–1135	Roger II; King of Sicily; 1095–1154	Sancha Alfónsez c. 1101–1125	Theresa; 1080–1130	Henry; Count of Portugal; 1066–1112	Elvira; Countess of Toulouse bef.1082? –1151
Ramiro Sánchez; Lord of Monzón; 1070–1116	Elvira Pérez de Lara c. 1111 – c. 1174	Fernando Pérez Furtado	Gontrodo Pérez bef.1105–1186	Berengaria of Barcelona; 1116–1149	Alfonso VII the Emperor; King of Castile, Galicia, and León; 1105–1157 r. 1127–1157	Richeza of Poland; 1140–1185	Sancha Raimúndez c. 1095/1102–1159
García Ramírez the Restorer; King of Navarre c. 1112–1150	Urraca the Asturian; 1133–c. 1179	Louis VII; King of the Franks; 1120–1180	Constance; 1140–1160	Alfonso II the Chaste; King of Aragon; 1157–1196	Sancha; 1154/1155–1208	Ferdinand; 1153–1157	Afonso I King of Portugal; 1109–1185
Sancho VI the Wise; King of Navarre; 1132–1194	Sancha; 1139–1179	Blanche of Navarre aft.1133–1156	Sancho III; King of Castile c. 1134–1158 r. 1157–1158	Ramón of Castilla c. 1136-?	Urraca López de Haro c. 1160 – c. 1230	Teresa Fernández de Traba ?–1180	Ferdinand II; King of León and Galicia; 1137–1188	Urraca of Portugal; 1151–1211	García c. 1142- 1145/1146	Alfonso c. 1144/1146- bef.1149
Eleanor of England; 1162–1214	Alfonso VIII the Noble; King of Castile; 1155–1214 r. 1158–1214	Sancho I King of Portugal; 1154–1212
Sancho; 1181	Henry; 1184	Ferdinand; 1189–1211	Mafalda; 1191–1211
Constance c. 1202–1243	Eleanor; 1200–1244	James I the Conqueror; King of Aragon; 1208–1276	Henry I King of Castile; 1204–1217 r. 1214–1217	Berengaria; Queen of Castile; 1179–1246 r. 1217	Alfonso IX; King of León and Galicia; 1171–1230	Theresa of Portugal; 1178–1250	Urraca; 1186/1187–1220	Afonso II; King of Portugal; 1185–1223	Blanche; 1188–1252	Louis VIII; King of France; 1187–1226
Elisabeth of Swabia; 1205–1235	Ferdinand III; King of Castile, Galicia, and León; 1201–1252 r. 1217–1252	Joan of Dammartin; Countess of Ponthieu; 1220–1279	Alfonso; Lord of Molina; 1202–1272
Fadrique; 1223–1277	Ferdinand; 1225– 1243/1248	Eleanor; 1227–?	Berengaria; 1228–1288/1289	Inés Rodríguez Girón ?–1265	Philip; 1231–1274	Christina of Norway; 1234–1262	Maria ?–1235	Ferdinand; Count of Aumale; 1238–bef.1264/1269	Louis; 1243–1269	Simon; 1244
Beatrice of Savoy ?–1292	Manuel; 1234–1283	Constance of Aragon; 1239–1269	Violant of Aragon; 1236–1301	Alfonso X the Wise; King of Castile, Galicia, and León; 1221–1284 r. 1252–1284	Henry the Senator; 1230–1303	Juana Núñez de Lara; 1286–1351	Sancho; Archbishop of Toledo; 1233–1261	Eleanor c. 1241–1290	Edward I King of England; 1239–1307	John; 1245
Margarita of Narbona	Peter; Lord of Ledesma; 1260/1261–1283	Berengaria; Lady of Guadalajara; 1253–1300	Peter III; King of Aragon; 1239–1285	James; Lord of Cameros; 1266–1284	Alfonso Fernández el Niño; 1243–1281	Blanca of Molina; 1243–1292	Beatrice; 1242–1303	Afonso III; King of Portugal; 1210–1279	Louis IX; King of France; 1214–1270
William VII; Marquess of Montferrat; 1240–1292	Beatrice; 1254–1286	Violant; 1265–1287/1308	Diego López V de Haro; Lord of Biscay; 1250–1310	Lope Díaz III de Haro; Lord of Biscay ?–1288	Juana Alfonso of Molina; 1245/46-aft.1307	María de Molina; 1265–1321	Sancho IV; King of Castile, Galicia, and León; 1258–1295 r. 1284–1295	Denis; King of Portugal; 1261–1325	Ferdinand de la Cerda; 1253–1275	Blanche of France; 1253–1323
Margaret of Montferrat ?–1286	John; Lord of Valencia de Campos; 1260–1319	María II Díaz de Haro; 1270–1342	James II the Just; King of Aragon; 1267–1327	Isabella; 1283–1328	Alfonso; 1286–1291	Henry; 1288–1299	Alfonso de la Cerda; 1270–1333
Alfonso IV; King of Aragon; 1299–1336	James of Aragon; 1296–1334	Maria of Aragon; Lady of Cameros; 1299–1347	Peter; Lord of Cameros; 1290–1319	Ferdinand IV; King of Castile, Galicia, and León; 1285–1312 r. 1295–1312	Constance of Portugal; 1290–1313	Beatrice; 1293–1359	Afonso IV; King of Portugal; 1291–1357	Philip; Lord of Cabrera and Ribera; 1292–1327	Margarita de la Cerda; 1293–aft.1328
Peter IV; King of Aragon; 1319–1387	Juan Manuel; Prince of Villena; 1282–1348	Eleanor; 1307–1359	Constance; 1308–1310	Maria of Portugal; 1313–1357	Alfonso XI; King of Castile, Galicia, and León; 1311–1350 r. 1312–1350	Eleanor de Guzmán; 1310–1351	Constanza Manuel; 1315/1323–1345	Peter I King of Portugal; 1320–1367	Inês de Castro; 1325–1355
María de Padilla; 1334–1361	Blanche of Bourbon; 1339–1361	Peter the Just; King of Castile, Galicia, and León; 1334–1369 r. 1350–1369	Juana de Castro ?–1374	Juana Manuel; 1339–1381	Henry II; King of Castile, Galicia, and León; 1334–1379 r. 1366–1379	Sancho; Count of Alburquerque; 1342–1374	Beatrice of Portugal; 1347–1381	Ferdinand I King of Portugal; 1345–1383
Beatrice; 1353–1369	Alfonso; 1359–1362	Edward III; King of England; 1312–1377	John; 1355–1405	Charles III the Noble; King of Navarre; 1361–1425	Eleanor aft.1363–1416	Juana Enríquez of Castilla	Denis; Lord of Cifuentes; 1354–1397	Constanza Enríquez of Castilla	John; Duke of Valencia de Campos; 1349–1397	John I King of Portugal; 1358–1433
Isabella of Castile c. 1355–1392	Edmund of Langley; Duke of York; 1341–1402	Constance of Castile; 1354–1394	John of Gaunt; Duke of Lancaster; 1340–1399	Joanna; 1367–1374	Eleanor of Aragon; 1358–1382	John I King of Castile, Galicia, and León; 1358–1390 r. 1379–1390	Beatrice of Portugal; 1373–c. 1420	Alfonso; Count of Noreña and Gijón; 1355–1398	Isabel; Lady of Viseu; 1364–1395
Catherine of Lancaster; 1373–1418	Henry III; King of Castile, Galicia, and León; 1379–1406 r. 1390–1406	Ferdinand I King of Aragon; 1380–1416	Eleanor of Alburquerque; 1374–1435	John; Constable of Portugal; 1400–1442
Maria; 1401–1458	Alfonso V King of Aragon; 1396–1458	Catherine; 1403–1439	Henry; Duke of Villena; 1400–1445	Maria of Aragon; 1396–1445	John II; King of Castile, Galicia, and León; 1405–1454 r. 1406–1454	Isabella of Portugal; 1428–1496	John II the Great; King of Aragon; 1398–1479	Eleanor of Aragon; 1402–1445	Edward; King of Portugal; 1391–1438
Catherine of Asturias; 1422–1424	Eleanor of Asturias; 1423–1425	Alfonso; Prince of Asturias; 1453–1468	Isabella I Queen of Castile, Galicia, and León; 1451–1504 r. 1474–1504	Ferdinand II of Aragon; King of Castile, Galicia, and León; 1452–1516 r. 1475–1504	Blanche II of Navarre; 1424–1464	Henry IV the Impotent; King of Castile, Galicia, and León; 1425–1474 r. 1454–1474	Joan of Portugal; 1439–1475
Family tree of Spanish monarchs also Kings of Castilla	Joanna la Beltraneja; 1462–1530	Afonso V King of Portugal; 1432–1481

== See also ==
- Castilian monarchs
- List of Castilian monarchs
- Spanish monarchs
