= Irene of Montferrat =

Byzantine Empress consort (c. 1274–1317)

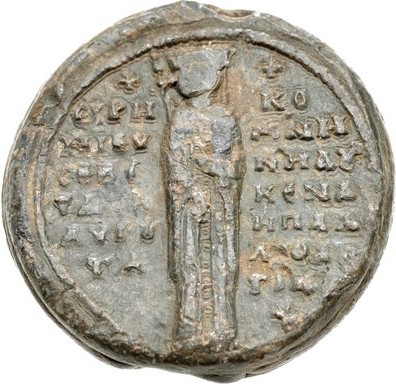
- Seal of Irene of Montferrat

Byzantine Empress consort
- Tenure: 1284–1317 (with Rita of Armenia, 1294–1317)

Byzantine empress in Thessalonica
- Reign: 1303–1317
- Successor: Anna of Savoy (from 1351)
- Born: Yolande of Montferrat c. 1274; Casale (modern-day Italy)
- Died: 1317 (aged 42–43); Drama (modern-day Greece)
- Spouse: Andronikos II Palaiologos
- Issue: John Palaiologos; Theodore I, Marquis of Montferrat; Simonis Palaiologina; Demetrios Palaiologos
- House: Aleramici (by birth); Palaiologos (by marriage)
- Father: William VII, Marquis of Montferrat
- Mother: Beatrice of Castile

Yolande (also Irene) of Montferrat (c. 1274 – 1317 in Drama), also known as Violante, then Empress Eirene or Irene, was the second wife of Andronikos II Palaiologos and thus Empress of the Byzantine Empire. She was the heiress of the Kingdom of Thessalonika and the last surviving member of the Ottonian branch of the Aleramici, heirs to the Margraviate of Montferrat.

== Life ==
Born in Casale, she was the daughter of William VII, Marquess of Montferrat and his second wife infanta Beatrice of Castile. Her maternal grandparents were King Alfonso X of Castile and his wife Violante of Aragon. Yolande (a variation of Violante) was named after her grandmother.

=== Empress ===
In 1284, Andronikos II, a widower by his first marriage with Anna of Hungary, married Yolanda (who was renamed Eirene as Empress). She and Andronikos II were distant cousins, both being descendants of Andronikos Doukas Angelos (ca. 1122–1185). With her, Eirene brought the Montferrat rights to the kingdom of Thessalonica, a dominion that, despite having been conquered half-a-century before Eirene's birth by the Byzantine state of Epirus, was still claimed by its short-lived (1204–1224) Montferrat royal dynasty.

It was later proven that the Italian Montferrat had no living male heirs of the Aleramici dynasty, and Eirene's sons were entitled to inherit it upon the 1305 death of Eirene's brother John I, Marquess of Montferrat.

=== Later life ===
Eirene left Constantinople in 1303 and settled in Thessalonica. She set up her own court in the city and controlled her own finances and foreign policy until her death fourteen years later. Nicephorus Gregoras portrayed her as an ambitious and arrogant leader in his historical writings.

A number of documents, issued by her as Augusta or Despoina, witness that she governed her appanage in Thessalonica as Empress in her own right.

According to Nicephorus Gregoras, she died of fever in 1317 in the city of Drama, located in present-day northeastern Greece, where she had a residence. She was initially buried there, possibly in the surviving Church of the Taxiarches, before her daughter Simonis Palaiologina transported her remains to Constantinople.

== Issue ==
- John Palaiologos (c. 1286–1308), despotēs.
- Bartholomaios Palaiologos (born 1289), died young.
- Theodore I, Marquis of Montferrat (1291–1338).
- Simonis Palaiologina (1294–after 1336), who married King Stefan Milutin of Serbia. No issue.
- Theodora Palaiologina (born 1295), died young.
- Demetrios Palaiologos (1297–1343), despotēs. Father of Irene Palaiologina.
- Isaakios Palaiologos (born 1299), died young.

Irene of Montferrat House of Aleramici Born: c. 1274 Died: 1317
Royal titles
Preceded by Theodora Palaiologina	Byzantine Empress consort 1284–1317 with Rita of Armenia (1294–1317)	Succeeded by Rita of Armenia
