= Blanche of Castile (1319–1375) =

- Lady of the Monastery of Santa María la Real de las Huelgas
- Born: August 1319; Alcocer
- Died: 1375; Las Huelgas
- Burial: Las Huelgas
- House: Castilian House of Burgundy
- Father: Infante Peter of Castile, Lord of Los Cameros
- Mother: Infanta Maria of Aragon

Blanche of Castile (Blanca; August 1319 – 1375) was by birth a member of the Castilian House of Burgundy. She was the only child of Infante Peter of Castile (son of King Sancho IV of Castile) and Infanta Maria of Aragon (daughter of King James II of Aragon).

== Life ==
Blanche was born in the city of Alcocer, Guadalajara in August 1319, two months after the death of her father in the Disaster of the Vega de Granada (25 June 1319). Her parents had married in December 1311 in the city of Calatayud. Her father, Infante Peter, was Lord of Los Cameros, Almazán, Berlanga de Duero, Monteagudo and Cifuentes and Mayordomo mayor del Rey of his brother, King Ferdinand IV of Castile; after the latter's death (which occurred in 1312) he was appointed guardian of his nephew Alfonso XI of Castile and joint Regent of the Kingdom together with the infant King's grandmother (and Peter's mother), Maria de Molina and Infante John of Castile (son of King Alfonso X of Castile), who was also killed in la Vega de Granada with Peter.

After the death of Infante Peter of Castile, Garci Lasso de la Vega (who later became a confidant of King Alfonso XI), wrote to King James II of Aragon that his son-in-law promised him that his unborn child would be raised by him as his ayo. King James II responded to Garci Lasso in a letter dated 7 August 1319 that he approved the late Infante's wish and also recommended him to continue to be a loyal servant for his daughter, the Infanta Maria.

In the spring of 1320, Blanche and her mother left the Kingdom of Castile for the Kingdom of Aragon, with the consent of Blanche's uncle Infante Philip of Castile and grandmother Maria de Molina, despite the fact that Blanche was the sole heiress of Infante Peter's possessions.

However, Juan Manuel, Prince of Villena (grandson of King Ferdinand III of Castile and contender for the Regency of the Kingdom) and his wife Constance of Aragon (daughter of King James II and in consequence Blanche's maternal aunt), insisted to King James II that Blanche and her mother should remain in Castile under their protection. Several historians believed that the real purpose of Juan Manuel to keep his sister-in-law and niece under his control was to secure the support of his father-in-law King James II in his fight for the regency, and in the same time, manage Blanche's inheritance.

In 1322, her mother and Garci Lasso de la Vega, who was the administrator of her estates in Castilian territory, agreed that Blanche should marry her cousin King Alfonso XI when she came of age; however, the plans fell through and the marriage didn't take place.

In 1325 King James II planned to marry his granddaughter to John of Castile, Lord of Biscay, nicknamed the One-Eyed, an enemy of Philip of Castile, Garci Lasso de la Vega and Alvar Núñez Osorio, who were the new confidants to Alfonso XI of Castile. In 1325 Alfonso XI attained his majority and annulled the betrothal of Blanche and John, fearing that the Lord of Biscay would take possession of Blanche's lands bordering the Kingdoms of Castile and Aragon, and from there he rebelled against him. In 1326, John of Castile was murdered in the town of Toro by orders of Alfonso XI.

In October 1327, Álvar Núñez Osorio negotiated with King Afonso IV of Portugal the marriage contracts of Blanche and Infante Peter of Portugal, the king's son and heir, and that of Infante Peter's sister, Maria and the future Alfonso XI of Castile. Since both Peter and Blanche were minors, the marriage had to wait. Blanche was taken to be raised in Portugal until she was of age for marriage. According to the Chronicle of Pedro I of Portugal by Fernão Lopes, during her stay, she began to show signs of illness and "defects of judgement" which made her unsuitable for marriage and for procreation. She was examined by physicians, including those sent by Alfonso XI, who confirmed her weak mental health and incapacity, and, because of "Infante Pedro's refusal and the evident mental disorder of doña Blanca" the proposed marriage never took place.

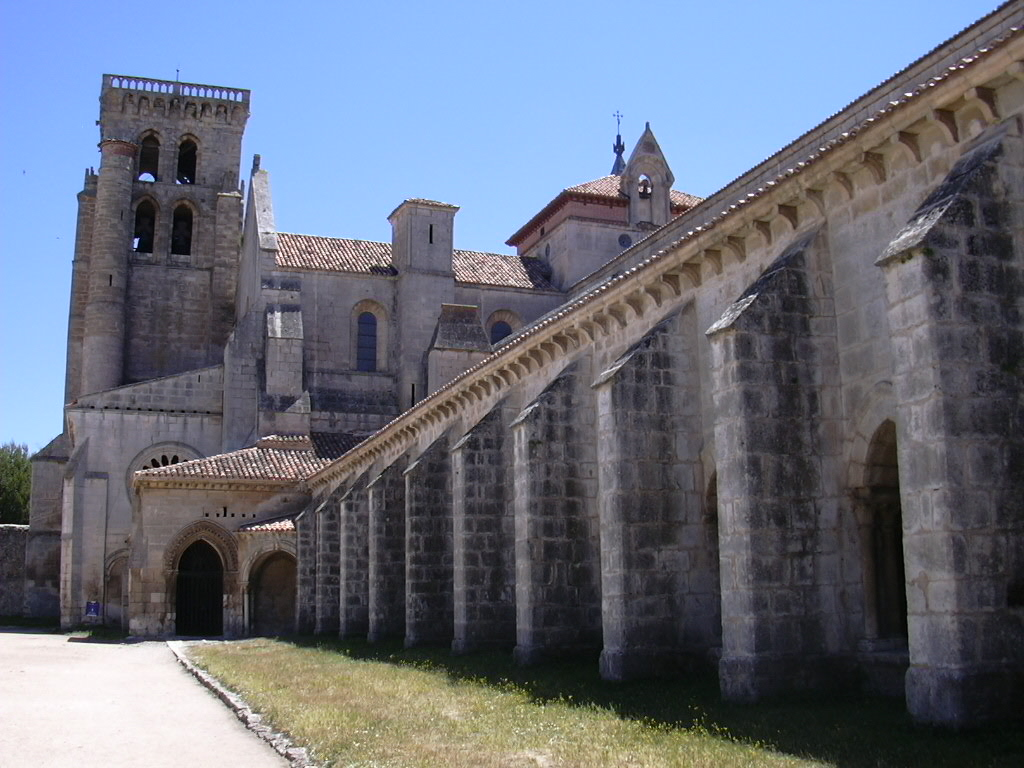
The Abbey of Santa María la Real de Las Huelgas in Castile and León

During this time, Juan Manuel secretly negotiated with King Alfonso IV the marriage of his daughter Constance Manuel with Infante Pedro. Blanche returned to Aragon accompanied by Martim Fernandes de Portocarreiro and an entourage of Portuguese nobles with her entire dowry and money. (Note: Fernão Lopes calls Blanche the first "esposa" of Infante Peter of Portugal. In medieval Spain and Portugal, "esposa" was "spouse" or "betrothed", not wife. The betrothal, "esponsales" in Spanish, was a promise of marriage, not the marriage itself.)

In 1329, during the meetings between Kings Alfonso IV of Aragon and Alfonso XI of Castile in the cities of Ágreda and Tarazona, the Castilian King, using his presence in the Aragonese Kingdom, disposed that his cousin Blanche, who was living with her mother in Aragon, returned with him to Castile, according to the Gran Crónica de Alfonso XI.

Alfonso XI gradually confiscated the lordships that had belonged to Blanche, and as of 1336, began to distribute these among his illegitimate children with Eleanor de Guzmán.

Once in the Kingdom of Castile, Blanche was named Lady of Santa María la Real de Las Huelgas, the last one to hold the civil dominion over the monastery.

Blanche was buried in Las Huelgas, alongside her parents. During excavations in the monastery in the first half of the 20th century, it was discovered that her remains are mummified. The mummy was big and corpulent, and her black-and-white habit was torn.

Her body now rests on a simple stone tomb placed in the nave of the Epistle, opposite the tomb containing the remains of her mother, infanta Maria of Aragon.

== Ancestry ==
Ancestors of Blanche of Castile (1319–1375)

8. Alfonso X of Castile
4. Sancho IV of Castile
9. Violant of Aragon
2. Peter of Castile
10. Alfonso of Molina
5. María de Molina
11. Mayor Alfonso de Meneses
1. Blanche of Castile
12. Peter III of Aragon
6. James II of Aragon
13. Constance of Sicily
3. Maria of Aragon
14. Charles II, Count of Anjou
7. Blanche of Anjou
15. Mary of Hungary

== Bibliography ==
- Arco y Garay, Ricardo del (1954). Sepulcros de la Casa Real de Castilla (in Spanish). Madrid: Instituto Jerónimo Zurita. Consejo Superior de Investigaciones Científicas. OCLC 11366237.
- Caetano de Souza, Antonio (1735). Historia Genealógica de la Real Casa Portuguesa (PDF) (in Portuguese). Vol. I. Lisbon: Lisboa Occidental, na oficina de Joseph Antonio da Sylva. ISBN 978-84-8109-908-9.
- Catalán, Diego (1977). Cátedra Seminario Menéndez Pidal (ed.). Gran Crónica de Alfonso XI. Vol. II. Madrid: Publisher Gredos. ISBN 84-600-0796-0.
- Diago Hernando, Máximo (2005). "Vicisitudes de un gran estado señorial en la frontera de Castilla con Aragón durante la primera mitad del siglo XIV: los señoríos sorianos del Infante Don Pedro". Anuario de Estudios Medievales (in Spanish). 35 (35, 1): 47–90. doi:10.3989/aem.2005.v35.i1.135. ISSN 0066-5061.
- García Fernández, Manuel (1998). "La infanta Doña María, monja de Sijena, y su política castellana durante la minoría de Alfonso XI (1312-1325)". Anuario de Estudios Medievales (in Spanish). 28 (28). Barcelona: Consejo Superior de Investigaciones Científicas, CSIC: Institución Milá y Fontanals. Departamento de Estudios Medievales: 157–174. doi:10.3989/aem.1998.v28.i0.580. ISSN 0066-5061.
- Gómez-Moreno Martínez, Manuel (1946). El Panteón de las Huelgas Reales de Burgos (in Spanish). Instituto Diego Velázquez. Consejo Superior de Investigaciones Científicas. OCLC 641865520.
- Herrero Sanz, María Jesús (2004). Guía Santa María la Real de Huelgas. Burgos (in Spanish). Madrid: Reales Sitios de España. Patrimonio Nacional. ISBN 84-7120-337-5.
- Lopes, Fernão (1735). Joze Pereira Bayam (ed.). Chronica del Rey D. Pedro I (in Portuguese). Lisbon: Lisboa Occidental. OCLC 560418350.
- Menéndez Pidal de Navascués, Faustino (1982). "La Casa Real de Castilla y León". Hidalguía (in Spanish). Vol. I. Series: Heráldica medieval española. Instituto Luis de Salazar y Castro. ISBN 8400051505.
- Mutgé i Vives, Josefa (1997). "Relacions entre Alfons el Benigne de Catalunya-Aragó i Alfons IV de Portugal" (PDF). XV Congreso de Historia de la Corona de Aragón. Actas. Tomo II. Relaciones de la Corona de Aragón con los estados cristianos (Siglos XII-XV) (in Catalan). Barcelona: Institució Milà y Fontanals. CSIC.: 477–492. ISBN 978-84-8380-241-0.
- Rodrigues Oliveira, Ana (2010). Rainhas medievais de Portugal. Dezassete mulheres, duas dinastias, quatro séculos de História (in Portuguese). Lisbon: A esfera dos livros. ISBN 978-989-626-261-7.
- Salazar y Acha, Jaime de (2000). Centro de Estudios Políticos y Constitucionales (ed.). La casa del Rey de Castilla y León en la Edad Media (in Spanish). Colección Historia de la Sociedad Política, dirigida por Bartolomé Clavero Salvador (1st ed.). Madrid: Rumagraf S.A. ISBN 978-84-259-1128-6.
