= Peter of Castile (disambiguation) =

Peter of Castile was the king of Castile from 1350 to 1369.

Peter of Castile may also refer to:

- Peter of Castile, Lord of Ledesma
- Peter of Castile, Lord of Cameros
