= Berengaria of Castile (disambiguation) =

Berengaria of Castile (1179 or 1180 – 1246) was queen regnant of Castile in 1217.

Berengaria of Castile may also refer to:

- Berengaria of Barcelona (1116–1149), queen consort of Castile
- Berengaria of Castile, Lady of Guadalajara (1253–1300), princess of Castile
