= 1257 imperial election =

Election for emperor of the Holy Roman Empire

- 13 January and 1 April 1257

7 Prince-electors 4 votes needed to win
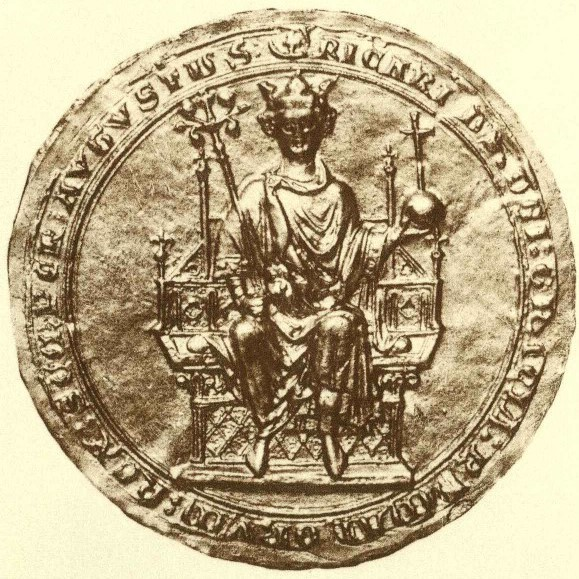

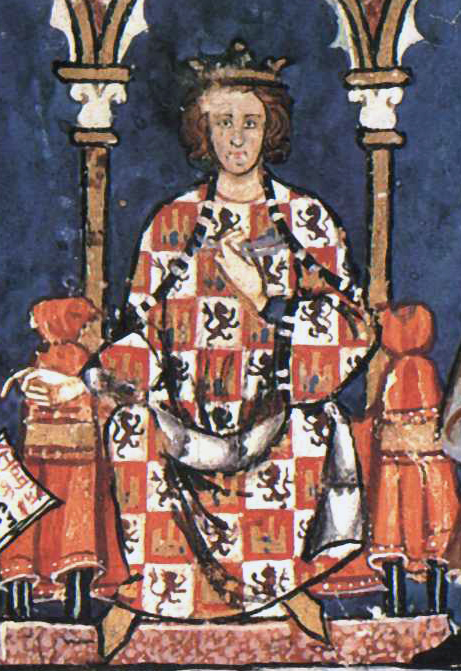
| Candidate | Richard of Cornwall | Alfonso X |
| House | Plantagenet | Burgundy |
| Electoral vote | 4 (13 January); 3 (1 April) | 3 (13 January); 4 (1 April) |
| Percentage | 57.1% (13 January); 42.9% (1 April) | 42.9% (13 January); 57.1% (1 April) |
King before election
William of Holland
House of Holland
Elected King
Disputed:
Richard of Cornwall (crowned)
Alfonso X of Castile
House of Plantagenet
Castilian House of Burgundy

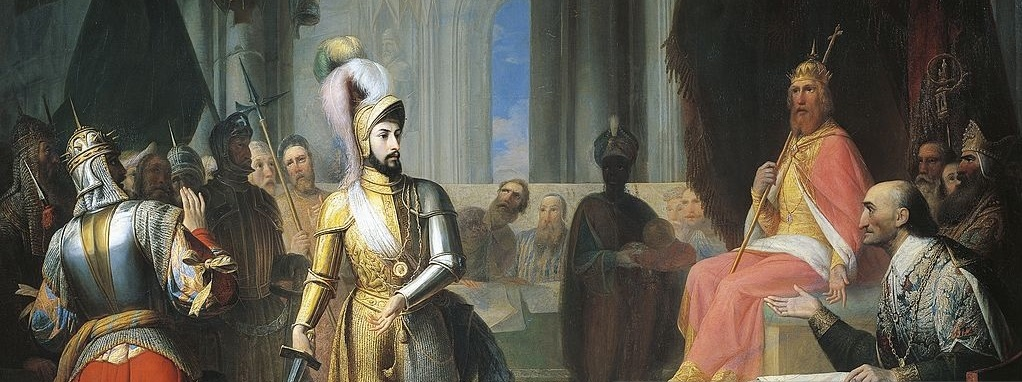
Peter II, Count of Savoy is invested with the vicariate general by Richard (right, wearing peach) (painting by Angelo Verolengo, 1863).

The 1257 imperial election was a double election in which the prince-electors of the Holy Roman Empire split into factions and elected two rivals, earl Richard of Cornwall and King Alfonso X of Castile, each claiming to have been legally elected.

== Background ==
The imperial elections of 1257 took place during a period known as the Great Interregnum of The Holy Roman Empire. In July 1245, Pope Innocent IV declared Frederick II, Holy Roman Emperor deposed, opening a split between the factions Guelphs and Ghibellines. This led to a period of chaos, as various figures tried to become King of the Romans. With the death of Conrad IV in 1254 and his rival claimant William of Holland in 1256, an imperial election became necessary.

The following prince-electors were called:

- Gerhard I of Dhaun Archbishop Elector of Mainz,
- Konrad von Hochstaden, Archbishop Elector of Cologne,
- Arnold II of Isenburg Archbishop Elector of Trier,
- Albert I Elector of Saxony,
- Louis, Elector Palatine,
- Ottokar II, King of Bohemia and Arch-Pincerna of the Empire,
- Ottokar II, acting as Duke of Austria and Styria by exercising the electoral claims of his then wife Margaret of Austria, Queen of Bohemia,
- Margraves of Brandenburg (John I, Margrave of Brandenburg and Otto III, Margrave of Brandenburg, holding a single joint vote).

The two leading candidates were Alfonso X of Castile and Richard of Cornwall. The pope and King Louis IX of France initially favored Alfonso, but they were convinced by the influential relatives of Richard's sister-in-law, the Eleanor of Provence, to support Richard. Both were related to the Hohenstaufen, Alfonso also campaigned with his descent from Byzantine emperor Isaac II Angelos and the Emperors of All Spain. Richard was additionally related to the Welfs.

With seven electors, it was necessary to gain at least four votes. Richard was backed by three German Electoral Princes (Cologne, Mainz, and the Palatinate), while Saxony, Brandenburg, and Trier supported Alfonso X of Castile. Ottokar II of Bohemia at first backed Richard before switching his support to Alfonso, and finally returned to supporting Richard, giving Richard the required simple majority. This led to his election in 1256 as King of Germany. Richard had to bribe four of the electors to secure the election, at an enormous cost of 28,000 marks.

== Election and aftermath ==
Richard of Cornwall was elected but only after a highly partisan election. On 27 May 1257 Konrad von Hochstaden, archbishop of Cologne, himself crowned Richard "King of the Romans" in Aachen; Like his lordships in Gascony and Poitou, his title of Germany never held much significance, and he made only four brief visits to Germany between 1257 and 1269.

== Bibliography ==
- Bayley, C. C. (1947). "The Diplomatic Preliminaries of the Double Election of 1257 in Germany". The English Historical Review. 62 (245): 457–483. doi:10.1093/ehr/LXII.CCXLV.457. JSTOR 555832.
- Roche, T. W. E. (1966). The King of Almayne: A 13th-Century Englishman in Europe. John Murray.
- Martínez, H. Salvador (2010). Alfonso X, the Learned. Translated by Odile Cisneros. Brill.
