= John I of Montferrat =

Marquis of Montferrat
- Coat of arms
- Reign: 1292 – 1305
- Predecessor: William VII, Marquis of Montferrat
- Successor: Theodore I, Marquis of Montferrat
- Other titles: Lord of Ivrea; Lord of Novara (1299–1301); Lord of Asti (1303–1304)
- Born: c. 1275
- Died: 9 January 1305 (aged 29–30)
- Buried: Lucedio Abbey
- Noble family: Aleramici
- Spouse: Margaret of Savoy
- Father: William VII, Marquis of Montferrat
- Mother: Beatrice of Castile

John I also known as the Just (circa 1275 – 1305) was the thirteenth Marquis of Montferrat, last of the Aleramici dynasty, from 1292 to his death.

== Life ==
John was the only son of William VII of Montferrat and his second wife Beatrice, daughter of Alfonso X of Castile. In his youth, John was put under the tutelage of Thomas I of Saluzzo during the period of William's imprisonment in Alessandria. William died in prison and the peace was upset by Piedmontese rebellions. Charles II of Naples intervened for the defence of John's realm, hoping in the end to install him as his vassal in Piedmont.

With Charles and Thomas, who renewed the investiture of Dogliani, John fought against Alessandria and Asti to recuperate territories lost by his father. He came in conflict with the House of Savoy and Milan. Philip of Savoy possessed Collegno, Grugliasco, Turin, and Pianezza which had been lost by William VII. In 1296, John married Marguerite of Savoy, daughter of Amadeus V, Count of Savoy and Sybille of Bâgé.

The league John formed against Matteo Visconti succeeded in chasing him from the city in 1302 and obtaining the submission of Asti in 1303. In January 1305, he fell ill while planning a campaign against Savoy. A few days after dictating his testament, which entrusted his lands to the commune of Pavia, he died and was buried with his forefathers in the abbey of Santa Maria di Lucedio.

The chronicler Guglielmo Ventura reported that John I was suspected to have been murdered in his text De Gestis Civium Astensium, although he was not present to witness John's death. John's personal physician, Emanuele of Vercelli, was charged with his relatively sudden death, but Ventura considered the charge to be baseless. However, after the funeral rites were completed, some of John's ministers murdered Emanuele, without a trial confirming or denying his guilt, by stabbing him repeatedly and then eating his flesh.

As he died childless he was succeeded by his sister Irene's son Theodore Palaiologos.

== Sources ==
- Cox, Eugene L. (1967). The Green Count of Savoy: Amedeus VI and Transalpine Savoy in the Fourteenth Century. Princeton University Press.
- Ruud, Jay (2008). Critical Companion to Dante: A Literary Reference to His Life and Work. Infobase Publishing.

Preceded by William VII	Marquis of Montferrat; 1292–1305	Succeeded by Theodore I
