= Yolande of Aragon (disambiguation) =

Yolande, Yolanda, Violant or Violante of Aragon may refer to:

- Violant of Aragon, queen consort of Castile, daughter of James I the Conqueror (1236–1301)
- Yolande of Aragon, Duchess of Calabria, daughter of Peter III the Great (1273–1302)
- Yolande of Aragon, Countess of Luna, countess of Luna, daughter of James II the Just (1310–1353)
- Violant of Bar, queen consort of Aragon, wife of John I the Hunter (c.1365– 1431)
- Yolande of Aragon, titular queen consort of Naples, daughter of John I the Hunter (1384–1442)
- Yolande of Aragon, Countess of Niebla, illegitimate daughter of Martin I the Young (c.1400–1428)
