= Second siege of Gibraltar =

- Part of the Battle of the Strait during the Reconquista
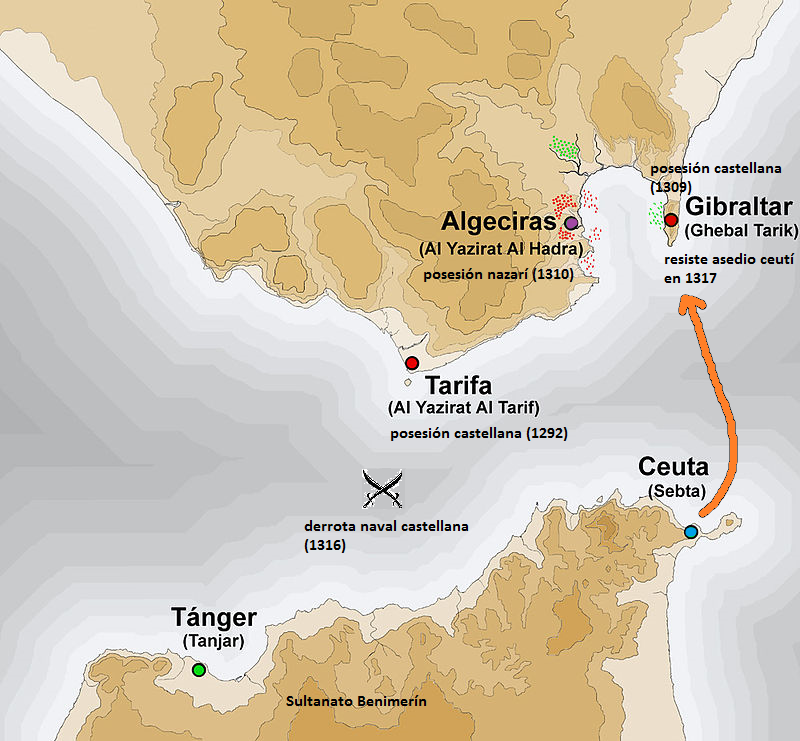
- The Strait of Gibraltar between 1310 and 1329.
Date	1316–1317
Location	Gibraltar, Spain 36°08′16″N 5°20′43″W
Result	Castilian victory

Belligerents
Emirate of Granada	Kingdom of Castile

Commanders and leaders
Ismail I of Granada	Alfonso XI Peter of Castile
- Location within Gibraltar Second siege of Gibraltar (Spain) Second siege of Gibraltar (Morocco)

The second siege of Gibraltar was an abortive attempt in 1316 by the forces of the Azafid Ceuta and the Nasrid Emirate of Granada to recapture Gibraltar, which had fallen to the forces of Ferdinand IV of Castile in 1309.

== History ==
The siege was part of a wider war in which Castile invaded Granada with the pretext of helping its vassal Nasr, the former Sultan of Granada who had been overthrown by his nephew Ismail I in 1314. As a response against the invasion, forces led by Yahya ibn Abi Talib al-Azafi governor of Ceuta allied to Granada, besieged Gibraltar and managed to enter some of its suburbs. Prince Peter, the regent of the Castilian king Alfonso XI led a combined land and naval force to relieve the town, prompting the besiegers to abandon the siege. The war between Granada and Castile would continue for several more years, punctuated with truces, although Castilian invasion threat ended in the 1319 Battle of the Vega of Granada, which resulted in the rout of the Castilian forces and the death of Peter and another regent John.

== Background ==
In 1309, the forces of Ferdinand IV of Castile conquered Gibraltar from the Emirate of Granada, as part of a wider war between Granada and an alliance of Castile, Aragon, and the Marinid Sultanate of Morocco. The city's mosque was converted into a church, and 1,125 of its inhabitants left for North Africa rather than live under Christian rule. Ferdinand and Nasr of Granada signed a peace treaty in May 1310, in which the Granadan sultan agreed to become a vassal of Castile. Nasr renewed the vassalage agreement in August 1312, shortly before Ferdinand's death in the same month. Ferdinand's one-year-old son Alfonso XI became king and the Castilian government was controlled by Prince Peter as regent, while in Granada, Nasr's rule faced a rebellion by his nephew Ismail. Nasr appealed to Peter for help, but it did not come in time. In February 1314, Ismail overthrew his uncle, who was allowed to leave the capital Granada and rule as governor in Guadix. In Guadix, Nasr continued to claim the throne, styled himself as "King of Guadix" and enlisted the help of Castile. Peter agreed to meet Nasr and help him, but separately he also told James II of Aragon that he intended to conquer Granada for himself, and would give one-sixth of it to Aragon in exchange for help.

== Prelude ==
After his accession, Ismail put his border regions on alert to anticipate Castilian intervention in favor of Nasr, and declared a jihad in 1315. Castile prepared its invasion forces in the spring of 1316. Peter with support from Nasr defeated Granadan forces under Uthman ibn Abi al-Ula near Alicún, and follow up with a raid deep into Granada to plunder and destroy the emirate's rich agricultural lands.

== Siege ==
In response to the Castilian invasion, Ismail prepared a siege against Gibraltar. In 1316, he secured an alliance with the Azafid leaders of the city of Ceuta in North Africa, while the Marinid Sultan Abu Said Uthman II refused to help. In the early months of 1316, troops led by Ceuta's governor Yahya ibn Abi Talib al-Azafi, whose military reputation was well-known, crossed the strait, defeated a Castilian fleet and laid a siege on Gibraltar. When news of the siege reached Peter, who was resting with his army in Cordoba, he left his army and went to Seville to organise naval and land forces to lift the Nasrid-Azafid blockade. He sent the Castilian fleet around Cape Trafalgar and into the Bay of Gibraltar, while he marched overland. The besiegers were already in position when the Castilian army and fleet approached. They conducted their strongest attacks from the southern flank, and had managed to enter Gibraltar's suburban area. The siege appeared to have ended because the besiegers retreated upon seeing the relief forces. Peter paid off and disbanded the relieving force, granting his soldiers grandes quittances – loosely speaking, double pay – and returned to his army at Cordoba to continue the harrying of Granada.

== Aftermath ==
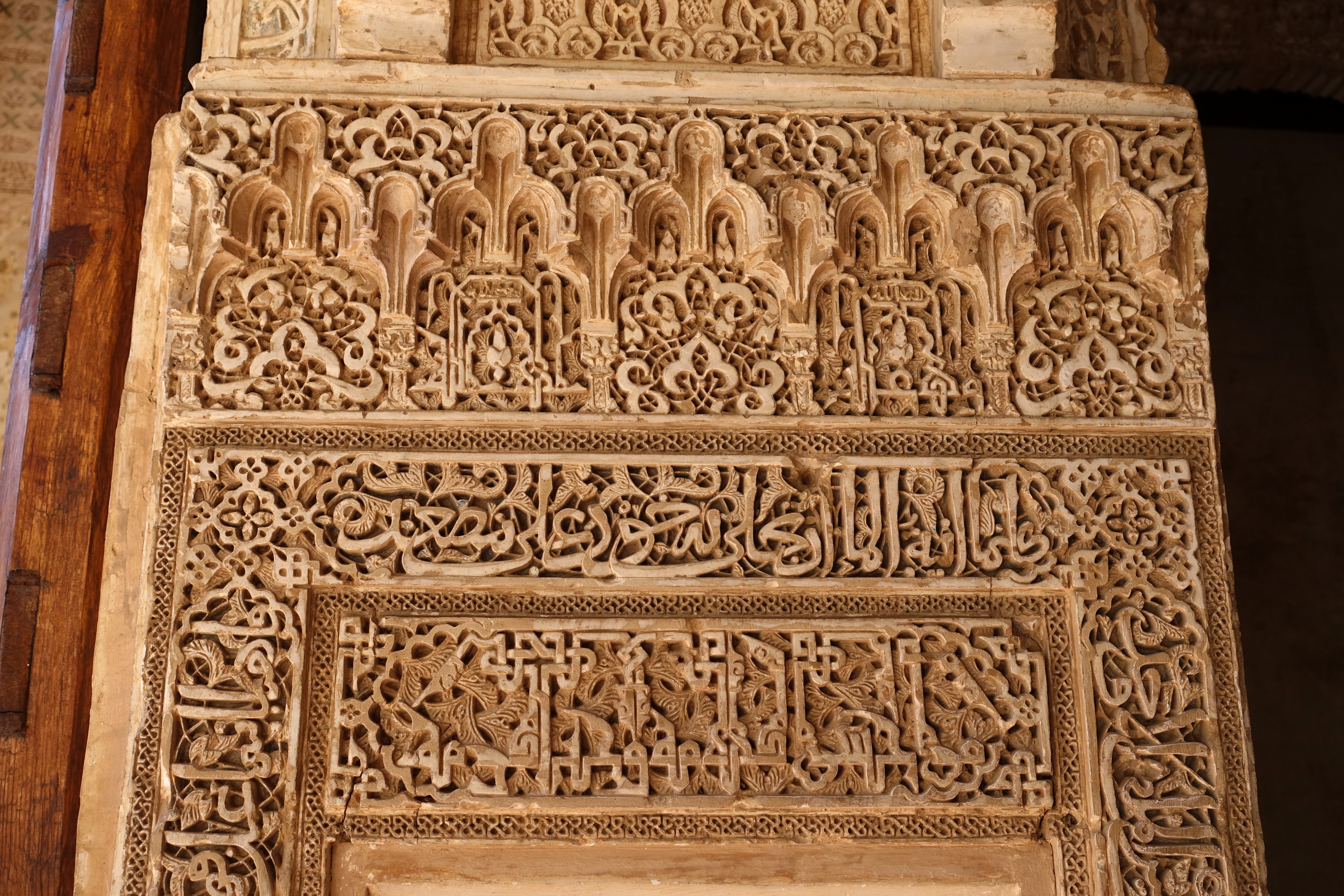
A poem in honour of Ismail I of Granada carved in the Palace of the Generalife

Late in summer of 1316, Peter and Ismail agreed to a truce until 31 March 1317. Peter invaded Granada again in 1317, ending in another truce, and in the same year secured a crusading bull in 1317 from Pope John XXII, who also authorised the use of funds levied by the church to support the war. War resumed in the spring of 1318, and by September Ismail and Peter agreed to another truce. Despite the pretext of helping Nasr, Peter's intention at this point was likely the total conquest of Granada, and he declared, "I would not be a son of King Don Sancho, if, within a few years, if God gives me life, I did not cause the house of Granada to be restored to the Crown of Spain." The Castilian threat against Granada ended in the Battle of the Vega of Granada in June 1319, during which Granadan troops under Uthman ibn al-Ula routed the Castilian troops, and which resulted in the death of Peter and Prince John who had earlier become a co-regent.
