= Alfonso Fernández el Niño =

Castilian noble

Alfonso Fernández
- Born: c. 1243
- Died: 1281 (aged 38)
- Noble family: Castilian House of Ivrea
- Spouse: Blanca Alfonso de Molina
- Issue: Isabel Alfonso de Molina; Mafalda Alfonso de Molina
- Father: Alfonso X of Castile
- Mother: Elvira Rodríguez de Villada

Alfonso Fernández el Niño (c. 1243–1281) was a Spanish nobleman, the illegitimate son of King Alfonso X of Castile and Elvira Rodríguez de Villada. He was the lord of Molina and Mesa through his marriage to Blanca Alfonso de Molina, daughter of the infante Alfonso of Molina and granddaughter of King Alfonso IX of León.

== Family origins ==
He was the son of Alfonso X of Castile, King of Castile and León, and Elvira Rodríguez de Villada. His paternal grandparents were Ferdinand III of Castile, King of Castile and León, and his wife, Queen Elisabeth of Swabia. His maternal grandparents were Rodrigo Fernández de Villada and his wife, María Muñoz.

He was the half-brother of, amongst others, Sancho IV of Castile, King of Castile and León, the infante Ferdinand de la Cerda, and of the infante Juan de Castilla.

== Biography ==
Alfonso's exact date of birth is unknown, although many historians consider it to be around the year 1243. From 1255 he appears in the historic record as a confirmed benefactor of certain royal privileges. He always enjoyed the confidence of his father, King Alfonso X of Castile due to his ability and competence, demonstrated in both the political and military spheres of royal duties.

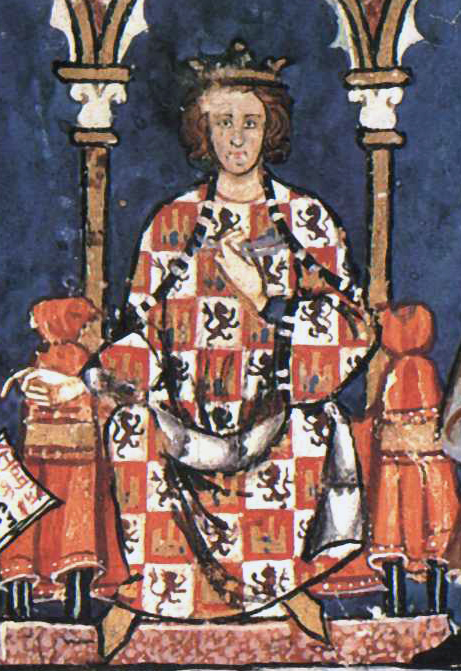
Painting of Alfonso X of Castile, father of Alfonso Fernández "el Niño".

In 1262, when he was around 19 years of age, he was charged with presiding over the commission for the division of land of the conquered Taifa of Niebla, expropriating land for the King's brother, Infante Henry of Castile with the help of Pedro Lorenzo, the Bishop of Cuenca. Five years later, in April 1267, he worked with Ferrand García, Archdeacon of Niebla, and the royal scribe, Domingo Ruiz, in the territorial demarcation of Huelva, Isla Saltés, Niebla, and Gibraleón. They were aided in this task by various caballeros, hombres buenos, and Muslim experts who knew the land and the villas to be demarcated.

After the defeat of the Mudéjars of Andalucia and Murcia, who had risen in revolt against King Alfonso X in 1264, Alfonso Fernández stayed in the area around Jerez de la Frontera. On 12 October 1269, Alfonso X ordered that there could be no more than 30 donadíos in that city and that the rest of its land would pass to the population of the city. Later in the year, with advice from Diego Sánchez de Funes amongst others, he participated in the demarcation of Medina-Sidonia.

In 1272, Alfonso of Molina died and Alfonso Fernández, along with his wife, inherited the Señorio of Molina and of Mesa, although it was his wife who really administrated the Señorio as Alfonso Fernández was given the responsibility of being the tenant-in-chief of Sevilla and spent most of his time in Andalucía. Later in the same year, he was given a greater privilege with the title Señor de Molina and as son of the King. As the position of Adelantado Mayor of the Frontier of Andalucia was vacant at the time, Alfonso was charged with many of the duties associated with that office, although he is not mentioned with that title in any official documents from that time .

In 1273, being regarded as an expert on military strategy, he accompanied his half-brother, the infante Ferdinand de la Cerda, son and heir of King Alfonso X, to the campaign that began in that year against the Emirate of Granada and against the rebels that had risen up against the King. Amongst others who joined this campaign were the infante Felipe de Castilla y Suabia, brother of the king, and Nuño González de Lara el bueno, the then head of the House of Lara. In 1274, his father entrusted him with the defence of Sevilla while he pursued the Fecho del Imperio or the title of King of the Romans, the throne of the Holy Roman Empire. While Alfonso Fernandez was defending the city against Muslim attacks, the Castilian troops were defeated at the Battle of Écija and the commander of the Christian troops and head of the House of Lara, Nuño González de Lara "the good", was killed during the battle.

In 1278, he participated, along with another half-brother, the infante Pedro de Castilla y Aragón, son of Alfonso X, and Sancho IV of Castile, the future king, in the command of the Siege of Algeciras. The siege eventually failed the next year and occurred at the same time as the naval disaster at the Battle of Algeciras which saw the complete destruction of the Castilian fleet. Alfonso Fernandez found himself in charge of the vanguard of the column of Castilian-Leonese forces during the retreat from Algeciras.

In 1281, he participated, along with the King, and the infantes Sancho, Pedro and Juan in an expedition of punishment and attrition against the Emirate of Granada. Alfonso Fernandez was put in charge of a column situated in the rearguard of the army. The other columns were commanded by the king and the three other infantes.

== Death ==
Alfonso Fernández "el Niño" died later in 1281, just after finishing the campaign against Vega de Granada. His last historical mention was in a letter written by his half-brother John dated 26 August 1281.

== Sepulcher ==
After his death, his body, according to various authors, was buried at the Monastery of Santa María de Matallana which is located in the Province of Valladolid. The claim of Alfonso's burial at that monastery was denied however by the Marqués de Mondéjar, Gaspar Ibañez de Segovia Peralta y Mendoza in his book Memorias historicas del Rei D. Alonso el Sabio i observaciones a su chronica.

The Monastery of Santa María de Matallana is today a ruin and unfortunately nothing has been conserved of the mortal remains of Alfonso Fernandez nor his sepulcher. Manuel Gómez-Moreno, in his work Sepulcros de la Casa Real de Castilla, does not mention Alfonso Fernandez as having been buried in any particular place, although he does mention that he died in 1281, shortly after the military expedition to Granada.

== Marriage and descendants ==
Alfonso Fernandez married Blanca Alfonso de Molina, who held titles over Molina and Mesa. She was the daughter of Alfonso of Molina and his wife, Mafalda González de Lara, they had two children:

- Isabel Alfonso de Molina (¿?-1292), married in 1290 Juan Núñez II de Lara (1276–1315), a noble with titles in Lara and Albarracín and the son of Juan Núñez I de Lara and his second wife, Teresa de Haro. She died without leaving descendants and was buried in the Abbey of Santa María la Real de Las Huelgas.
- Mafalda Alfonso de Molina died in infancy and was buried at the Convent of San Francisco at Molina de Aragón.

== Bibliography ==
- Del Arco y Garay, Ricardo; Ricardo del Arco y Garay (1954). Sepulcros de la Casa Real de Castilla. Madrid: Instituto Jerónimo Zurita. Consejo Superior de Investigaciones Científicas.
- González-Doria, Fernando (2000). Diccionario heráldico y nobiliario de los Reinos de España (1st ed.). San Fernando de Henares (Madrid): Ediciones Trigo S. L. ISBN 84-89787-17-4.
- González Jiménez, Manuel (October 2004). Alfonso X el Sabio (1st ed.). Barcelona: Editorial Ariel S. A. ISBN 84-344-6758-5.
- Herrera Casado, Antonio (2000). Molina de Aragón: veinte siglos de historia. Vol. 33 de Tierra de Guadalajara. Guadalajara: AACHE Ediciones. ISBN 84-95179-42-3.
- Ibañez de Segovia Peralta y Mendoza, Gaspar; Nicolás Cotoner y Cotoner (1777). Joachin Ibarra (ed.). Memorias historicas del Rei D. Alonso el Sabio i observaciones a su chronica. Madrid: en casa de D. Joachin Ibarra.
- De Loaysa, Jofré; García Martínez, Antonio (1982). Crónicas de los Reyes de Castilla Fernando III, Alfonso X, Sancho IV y Fernando IV (1248-1305) (in Latin and Spanish) (2nd ed.). Murcia: Academia Alfonso X el Sabio, Colección Biblioteca Murciana de bolsillo Nº 27. ISBN 84-00-05017-7.
- Mariana, Juan de; Juan de Mariana (1855). Imprenta y librería de Gaspar y Roig, editores (ed.). Historia General de España (Reedición ed.). Madrid: Gaspar y Roig.
- Salvador Martínez, H (2003). Alfonso X el Sabio (1st ed.). Madrid: Ediciones Polifemo. ISBN 978-84-86547-66-0.
- Menéndez Pidal de Navascués, Faustino; Faustino Menéndez Pidal de Navascués (1982). Instituto Luis de Salazar y Castro (ed.). Heráldica medieval española. Vol. I: La Casa Real de Castilla y León. Hidalguía. ISBN 84-00-05150-5.
- "La autonomía histórica del señorío de behetría de linaje de Molina". Hidalguía (154–155). Madrid: Ediciones Hidalguía. May–August 1979. ISSN 0018-1285.
- Estepa Díez, Carlos (2006). "Doña Juana Núñez y el señorío de los Lara". Revue interdisciplinaire d'études hispaniques médiévales (1). París: SEMH-Sorbonne. doi:10.4000/e-spania.315. hdl:10261/15148. S2CID 162303549.
