= James of Castile, Lord of Cameros =

James of Castile Lord of Cameros
- Arms of Castile and León
- Born: 11 July 1268
- Died: 9 August 1284 (aged 16)
- Noble family: Castilian House of Ivrea
- Father: Alfonso X of Castile
- Mother: Violant of Aragon

James of Castile (11 July 1268 – 9 August 1284), was an infante of Castile and Lord of Cameros. He was the youngest son of Alfonso X of Castile and Violant of Aragon.

== Biography ==
The infante was born Jaime of Castile in 1268. On 17 February 1281, he was knighted by his father in the city of Burgos, while his brothers, John and Peter celebrated their betrothals. He received the lordship of the Cameros from his father in 1277, after Simón Ruiz de los Cameros, Lord de los Cameros, was executed along with his uncle Frederick of Castile after the latter tried to seize the throne from James's father. When another civil war broke out this time between his father Alfonso X and his brother Sancho, James was initially allied with his brother. However, in March 1283, he left Sancho and returned to the service of his father the king.

In 1283, with the collaboration of Juan Alfonso de Haro, revolted cities of Soria and Ágreda against his brother Sancho. Alfonso X, as a reward for his service, gave James in his will the kingdom of Murcia, on condition that it was a vassal of the Kingdom of Castile and León, which the king bequeathed to his grandson Alfonso de la Cerda, infant son of the late Ferdinand de la Cerda.
