= Beatrice of Castile, Marchioness of Montferrat =

Beatrice of Castile

Marchioness of Montferrat
- Tenure: 1271-1286
- Born: 1254
- Died: 1286 (aged 31–32)
- Spouse: William VII, Marquess of Montferrat
- Issue: John I, Marquess of Montferrat; Yolande, Byzantine Empress; Alessina Orsini
- House: Castilian House of Ivrea
- Father: Alfonso X of Castile
- Mother: Violant of Aragon

Beatrice of Castile (5 November or 6 December 1254 – 1286) was a daughter of Alfonso X of Castile and his wife Violant of Aragon. She was Marchioness of Montferrat by her marriage and was mother of Irene of Montferrat.

== Family ==
Beatrice was the second of eleven children, her siblings included Sancho IV of Castile and Ferdinand de la Cerda, Infante of Castile. Of the eleven children, only six had their own children, this included Beatrice. She was a member of the Castilian House of Burgundy.

Beatrice's maternal grandparents were James I of Aragon and his second wife Violant of Hungary, herself daughter of Andrew II of Hungary and Yolanda de Courtenay.

Beatrice's paternal grandparents were Ferdinand III of Castile and Elisabeth of Hohenstaufen, herself daughter of Philip of Swabia and Irene Angelina.

== Life ==
Beatrice was originally betrothed to John II, Margrave of Brandenburg. Her betrothal was arranged by her father to attract the support of Brandenburg for his candidacy for the throne of Germany. Although the name of the king's daughter is not specified in the source, it could only have been Beatrice as her older sister Berenguela was already betrothed at that date. The engagement was however broken off.

Beatrice married in Murcia in August 1271 to William VII, Marquess of Montferrat. He had been married twice already but only had a daughter Margaret, who married Beatrice's brother John. Beatrice and William had the following children:

1. a son (1272–1273), died young
2. a son (1272–1273), died young and twin of previous
3. Yolande (1274–1317), married Andronikos II Palaiologos and had issue
4. John I (c. 1275–1305), succeeded his father as Marquess
5. Alessina (died before 1305), married Poncello Orsini

Beatrice died in 1286, her husband died six years later. Of her five children, three lived to adulthood.

== Ancestry ==
Ancestors of Beatrice of Castile, Marchioness of Montferrat

16. Ferdinand II of León
8. Alfonso IX of León
17. Urraca of Portugal
4. Ferdinand III of Castile
18. Alfonso VIII of Castile
9. Berengaria of Castile
19. Eleanor of England
2. Alfonso X of Castile
20. Frederick I, Holy Roman Emperor
10. Philip of Swabia
21. Beatrice I, Countess of Burgundy
5. Elisabeth of Hohenstaufen
22. Isaac II Angelos
11. Irene Angelina
23. Unknown Palaiologina?, afterwards Irene
1. Beatrice of Castile
24. Alfonso II of Aragon
12. Peter II of Aragon
25. Sancha of Castile
6. James I of Aragon
26. William VIII of Montpellier
13. Marie of Montpellier
27. Eudokia Komnene
3. Violant of Aragon
28. Béla III of Hungary
14. Andrew II of Hungary
29. Agnes of Antioch
7. Violant of Hungary
30. Peter II of Courtenay
15. Yolanda de Courtenay
31. Yolanda of Flanders
