= Berengaria of Castile, Lady of Guadalajara =

Castilian princess

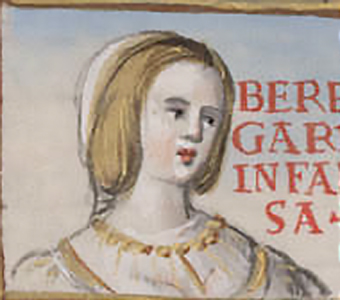
- Born: 1253; Seville
- Died: 1300 (aged 46–47); Guadalajara
- Father: Alfonso X of Castile
- Mother: Violant of Aragon

Berengaria of Castile (Seville, 1253 – Guadalajara, 1300), Infanta of Castile and Lady of Guadalajara in her own right. She was the eldest child of King Alfonso X of Castile and Violante of Aragon. She was probably named after her paternal great-grandmother, Queen Berengaria of Castile. As the first-born daughter, she was the heiress to the throne until the birth of her brother, the Infante Fernando de la Cerda. Her paternal grandparents were King Ferdinand III of Castile and his first wife Elisabeth of Swabia and her maternal grandparents were King James I of Aragon and his second wife Violant of Hungary.

== Life ==
Berengaria was born in Seville at the end of 1253, and her first years were spent in that city, being cared for by a noble named Don Romero. In the Cortes of Toledo in 1254 she was recognized as heir presumptive due to the lack of male descent from King Alfonso X. In the fall of 1254, Queen Violante gave birth a second daughter, Beatrice, prompting Alfonso X to consider the possibility that his eldest daughter Berengaria might become queen regnant. For this reason, he began negotiations to marry her with Louis of France, eldest son and heir of King Louis IX of France.

On 5 May 1255 there was a plenary assembly in Palencia of the different estates, whose objective was to confirm Berengaria as heir presumptive. On 23 October 1255, however, her brother Ferdinand de la Cerda was born. As a son, he displaced Berengaria in the line of succession and became the heir apparent. The betrothal between Berengaria and Louis of France was signed by contract in Paris on 20 August 1255. However, the union never took place because the young Louis died on 11 January 1260.

In the codicil of the will of Alfonso X, drawn up on 10 January 1284, three months before his death, the monarch confirmed to his eldest daughter Berengaria, who held the Lordship of Guadalajara, the possession of all the goods that he had previously granted her and that her brother, the future King Sancho IV had taken from her. Alfonso X also ordered in his codicil that if Berengaria did not recover her possessions, the income from Écija and Jerez de la Frontera be granted to her, or the amount of the rents of one of those two cities, located in the rents of Seville, providing at the same time that when the infanta died, the rents should be received by her brother, the infante John of Castile, Lord of Valencia de Campos, to whom Alfonso X had granted in his testament the Kingdom of Seville, or his heirs.

Berengaria, who according to some sources rejected the marriage proposal of the Sultan of Egypt, because he was not a Christian, entered as a nun in the Abbey of Santa María la Real de Las Huelgas of Burgos, founded by King Alfonso VIII of Castile with the purpose of turning it into the necropolis of the Castilian royal family.

Various sources indicate that Berengaria died in the city of Guadalajara in 1300, while others maintain that she died in the Monastery of San Clemente in Seville, where the infanta was supposedly transferred in 1303 by the will of her nephew, King Ferdinand IV of Castile.

== Sepulture ==
There is controversy about the whereabouts of Berengaria's mortal remains, since there are three places which currently claimed to be the place of her burial. In the Convent of Santa Clara of Toro, founded by Berengaria, there is a wooden urn, held aloft by three lions, on one side of the main chapel of the church, and in the centre of the wooden urn are painted the royal arms, and sides are written the following verses:

"On this shelf is covered in mourning, Infanta and Lady of Guadalajara, King Alfonso and his wise and dear wife Violante, a wise monarch of powerful wars. This lady founded Santa Clara."

A privilege granted by King John II of Castile to the Convent of Santa Clara of Toro, confirms that in this convent were place Berengaria's remains, as well as the authentication of the remains deposited inside the urn, which were examined in 1772. However, there are documents that indicate that her remains were later transferred to the disappeared Monastery of Santo Domingo el Real in Madrid, to which she had donated the city of Guadalajara. In 1869, before the demolition of the Monastery of Santo Domingo, a witness saw, located in front of the tomb that contained the remains of infanta Constance, daughter of Ferdinand IV, who was also buried in the monastery, a tombstone which contained the following inscription:

"HERE LIES THE VERY HIGH AND POWERFUL LADY THE INFANTA BERENGARIA, DAUGHTER OF THE KING ALONSO, INTITULATED THE EMPEROR."

The niche that contained the mortal remains in the Monastery of Santo Domingo el Real in Madrid was opened on 23 April 1869, with those present testifying that "the corpse has also been found, also mummified, with a very curious headdress and wrapped in luxurious silk clothing". Once the remains were examined, they were again deposited in their niche, but when the building was demolished in 1869, the mortal remains of both infantas Berengaria and Constance were transferred to the crypt of the Church of San Antonio de los Alemanes in Madrid, where they currently rest.

Notwithstanding all of the above, others sources stated that Berengaria was inhumed in the Royal Monastery of San Clemente in Seville, where Queen María of Portugal, wife of King Alfonso XI of Castile and mother of King Peter, was also buried.

== Ancestry ==
Ancestors of Berengaria of Castile, Lady of Guadalajara

16. Ferdinand II of León
8. Alfonso IX of León
17. Urraca of Portugal
4. Ferdinand III of Castile
18. Alfonso VIII of Castile
9. Berengaria of Castile
19. Eleanor of England
2. Alfonso X of Castile
20. Frederick I, Holy Roman Emperor
10. Philip of Swabia
21. Beatrice I, Countess of Burgundy
5. Elisabeth of Hohenstaufen
22. Isaac II Angelos
11. Irene Angelina
23. Unknown Palaiologina?, afterwards Irene
1. Berengaria of Castile
24. Alfonso II of Aragon
12. Peter II of Aragon
25. Sancha of Castile
6. James I of Aragon
26. William VIII of Montpellier
13. Marie of Montpellier
27. Eudokia Komnene
3. Violant of Aragon
28. Béla III of Hungary
14. Andrew II of Hungary
29. Agnes of Antioch
7. Violant of Hungary
30. Peter II of Courtenay
15. Yolanda de Courtenay
31. Yolanda of Flanders

== Bibliography ==
- Arco y Garay, Ricardo del (1954). Sepulcros de la Casa Real de Castilla (in Spanish). Madrid: Instituto Jerónimo Zurita. Consejo Superior de Investigaciones Científicas. OCLC 11366237.
- Borrero Fernández, Mercedes (1987). Consejo Superior de Investigaciones Científicas (ed.). "Un monasterio sevillano convertido en panteón real durante la Baja Edad Media". Anuario de Estudios Medievales (in Spanish) (17). Madrid: 133–148. ISSN 0066-5061.
- Fernández Peña, María Rosa (2006). La Iglesia española y las instituciones de caridad — Capítulo: La Santa, Pontificia y Real Hermandad del Refugio y Piedad de Madrid en la iglesia de San Antonio de los Alemanes, una institución de caridad dentro de un recinto de arte (in Spanish) (1ª ed.). Madrid: Ediciones escurialenses. pp. 883–898. ISBN 84-89788-16-2.
- González Jiménez, Manuel (2004). Alfonso X el Sabio (in Spanish) (1ª ed.). Barcelona: Editorial Ariel S. A. ISBN 84-344-6758-5.
- Ibáñez de Segovia Peralta y Mendoza, Gaspar (1777). Joachin Ibarra (ed.). Memorias históricas del Rei D. Alonso el Sabio i observaciones a su chronica (in Spanish). Madrid.
- Loaysa, Jofré de; García Martínez, Antonio (1982). Crónicas de los Reyes de Castilla Fernando III, Alfonso X, Sancho IV y Fernando IV (1248-1305) (in Spanish) (2ª ed.). Murcia: Academia Alfonso X el Sabio, Colección Biblioteca Murciana de bolsillo Nº 27. ISBN 84-00-05017-7.
- Mariana, Juan de (1855). Historia General de España (in Spanish) (Reedición ed.). Madrid: Imprenta y librería de Gaspar y Roig, editores. OCLC 8097245.
- Menéndez Pidal de Navascués, Faustino (1982). Instituto Luis de Salazar y Castro (Consejo Superior de Investigaciones Científicas) (ed.). Heráldica medieval española: la Casa Real de León y Castilla (in Spanish). Volumen I. Hidalguía. ISBN 978-84-00-05150-1.
- Menezo Otero, Juan José (2005). Reinos y Jefes de Estado desde el 712 (in Spanish) (5ª ed.). Madrid: Historia Hispana. ISBN 84-604-9610-4.
- Pérez Algar, Félix (1997). Alfonso X el Sabio: Biografía (in Spanish). Madrid: Studium Generalis. ISBN 84-605-6339-1.
- Salvador Martínez, H (2003). Alfonso X el Sabio (in Spanish) (1ª ed.). Madrid: Ediciones Polifemo. ISBN 9788486547660.
- Valdeón Baruque, Julio (2003). Alfonso X: la forja de la España moderna (in Spanish) (1ª ed.). Ediciones Temas de Hoy, S.A. ISBN 84-8460-277-X.
- Valdeón Baruque, Julio (1986). Alfonso X el Sabio (in Spanish) (1ª ed.). Castilla y León: Junta de Castilla y León, Consejería de Educación y Cultura. ISBN 84-505-3366-X.
- Ybarra y López-Dóriga, Fernando de (1997). Un largo siglo de amores y desamores en el Alcázar de Sevilla (1248-1368) (in Spanish) (1ª ed.). Sevilla: Real Academia Sevillana de Buenas Letras. ISBN 84-8093-016-0.
- Zurita, Jerónimo (2005). Anales de Aragón (PDF) (in Spanish) (1ª ed.). Institución Fernando el Católico. ISBN 84-7820-823-2.
