= Maria of Aragon, Lady of Cameros =

Maria of Aragon

Lady of Cameros
- Tenure: 1310 - 1319
- Born: c. 1299
- Died: 1347; Villanueva de Sigena
- Burial: Royal Monastery of Santa María de Sigena
- Spouse: Peter of Castile, Lord of Cameros
- Issue: Blanche of Castile
- House: Barcelona
- Father: James II of Aragon
- Mother: Blanche of Anjou

Maria of Aragon (c. 1299–1347 in Sijena) was a daughter of James II of Aragon and his second wife Blanche of Anjou.

She married Peter of Castile, Lord of Cameros (1290–1319), son of Sancho IV of Castile. Three years after his death, she became a nun in the Order of the Hospital in Tortosa.

Her daughter, Blanche of Castile (1319–1375), was betrothed to Peter I of Portugal but the marriage never took place. Maria died at Sijena in 1347.
