= William VII of Montferrat =

Italian noble (c. 1240–1292)

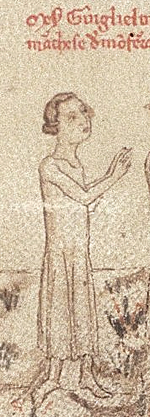

Marquis of Montferrat
- Reign: 12 May 1253 – 6 February 1292
- Predecessor: Boniface II, Marquis of Montferrat
- Successor: John I, Marquis of Montferrat
- Born: c. 1240; Trino
- Died: 6 February 1292 (aged 51–52); Alessandria
- Burial: Santa Maria di Lucedio
- Spouse: Isabella of Gloucester (m. 1253; died 1271) Beatrice of Castile (m. 1271)
- Issue: Margaret; Yolande; John I Alessina
- House: Aleramici
- Father: Boniface II, Marquis of Montferrat
- Mother: Margaret of Savoy

William VII (c. 1240 – 6 February 1292), called the Great Marquis (Italian: il Gran Marchese), was the twelfth Marquis of Montferrat from 1253 to his death. He was also the titular King of Thessalonica.

== Biography ==
=== Youth ===
William was born in Trino, the eldest son of Boniface II and Margaret of Savoy. He was named his father's heir in a testament of 1253, the year of his father's death and his succession. He remained under his mother's regency until 1257. Upon attaining his majority, he married Isabella, daughter of Richard de Clare, 6th Earl of Hertford, by second wife Maud de Lacy, in 1258. William's mother was a first cousin of Eleanor of Provence, queen consort of England, and it was through the latter's influence that the marriage was arranged.

=== Marriage and issue ===
William married Isabel de Clare (1240 – before 1271), daughter of Richard de Clare, 6th Earl of Gloucester, and second wife Maud de Lacy. She was allegedly killed by her husband. They had:

- daughter (Note: Kinkade makes no mention of the first daughter's name, simply stating William and Isabelle's second daughter married Infante Juan)
- Margaret, married Infante John

Following Isabelle's death in 1271, William married Beatrice, daughter of Alfonso X of Castile and Violant of Aragon.

1. a son (1272–1273), died young and twin of next
2. a son (1272–1273), died young and twin of previous
3. Yolande (1274–1317), married Andronikos II Palaiologos and had issue
4. John I (c. 1275–1305), succeeded his father as Marquis
5. Alessina (died before 1305), married Poncello Orsini

=== Piedmontese politics ===
In his first years, William looked to exert his power in the southern Piedmont, as many of his predecessors had tried, fighting the independence of the communes of Alessandria and Asti. William sought alliance and support from the Kingdom of France and the Roman Catholic Church. However, his relationship and proximity to the Holy Roman Emperor left him at odds with the Ghibellines. His anti-imperial, pro-French, Guelph policy left him not insignificant problems concerning the imperial authority and his imperialist neighbours.

His participation in Guelph politics and the planned invasion of Lombardy with Charles I of Naples, caused a war with Oberto Pelavicino, the chief Ghibelline commander in the region, in 1264. William resisted him with determination and effectiveness, occupying the fortresses of Acqui Terme, Tortona, and Novi Ligure, and affirming his hold on Nizza Monferrato. In 1265, French reinforcements arrived. Less than eight years from his accession, William had extended his power to Lanzo and the vicinity of Alessandria.

=== War against Charles I of Naples ===
Though aided immensely by the Angevins, the lords of Montferrat had never been known for loyalty to a cause or party and William was no different, abandoning Charles soon after his success, probably fearful of the king's rising power in northern Italy and of being encircled by an Angevin state.

William allied with Alfonso X of Castile, who had declared himself the heir of Manfred of Sicily and therefore of the Emperor Frederick II, as the leaders of an anti-Angevin coalition. In order to cement the alliance also with the Spanish king, the Marquis (widowed since 1270) married Beatrice, Alfonso's daughter, at Murcia in August 1271. From Alfonso, William received the promise of military aid in the case of an Angevin attack. Alfonso named his son-in-law as vicar-general of Lombardy, in opposition to Charles' vicar. This last attacked William's lands and despite the promises, he received no aid from Alfonso.

Left alone and seeing his domains under attack by his enemies and Tortona and Acqui lost, William scrambled to form an alliance with the Ghibelline cities of Pavia, Asti, and Genoa. He continued to wait for aid from Alfonso, but the king had given up on Germany and Italy. Nevertheless, a small troupe of Spanish soldiers found their way to Montferrat. With these and his allies, despite the excommunication of Pope Gregory X, William prepared to defend his territories. On 10 November 1274, at the Battle of Roccavione, William and the Ghibellines definitively defeated Charles I and routed his forces. He advanced far, taking Trino Vercellese and Turin, which offended the House of Savoy, which considered itself the rightful possessor of the city on the Po.

Around 1278, the commune of Vercelli recognized William as lord, and Alessandria named him captain. Casale and Tortona also nominated him as captain. William thus ended the war in a superior position to that with which he had begun.

=== Captain of Milan ===
Having become the military leader of various Lombard cities, including Pavia, Vercelli, Alessandria, Tortona, Genoa, Turin, Asti, Alba, Novara, Brescia, Cremona, and Lodi, he was also elected head of the anti-Angevin coalition. Ottone Visconti asked William to fight the Torriani (1278), with an annual salary of 10,000 lire. However, he was defeated and forced to return to Montferrat.

Milan, however, was left bereft of military leadership and Ottone Visconti soon requested William's aid again. He was invited back to the city and accepted, this time demanding the lordship of Milan for ten years in exchange.

William did not long enjoy his time in Milan, for his authority was soon challenged in Alessandria and Asti. He left Milan in the hands of a vicar and went to fight the rebellious cities. However, he was captured by Thomas III of Savoy, whom he had made his enemy in taking Turin. In order to obtain his liberty, he ceded Turin, as well as Grugliasco and Collegno, and a huge sum of gold. He was freed on 21 June 1280. Starting from that moment, the power in Piedmont would gradually pass into the hands of the House of Savoy.

Weakened by continuous warfare, William soon lost control of Milan. On 27 December 1281, he was chased from the city by the one who had brought him there, Ottone Visconti.

=== Final war ===
In compensation for the loss of Milan, William received Alba. His daughter by Beatrice of Castile, Violante (Yolanda), married the Byzantine Emperor Andronicus II Palaeologus, taking the name Irene (Eirene). William was soon campaigning again, in a continuous flow of defeats alternated to victories. Having reduced Alessandria to submission, the citizens of Asti paid the Alessandrians a large sum of money and induced them to revolt against the Marquis again. Constrained to deal with Alessandria once and for all, William encamped with a large army in front of the city walls. Heeding the appeals of the citizens, he entered the city to negotiate a peace, but was imprisoned in a cage, iron or wooden, for a public exhibition, until death released him 18 months later, probably due to hunger. Dante refers to the misery caused in Monferrato and the Canavese by the war with Alessandria in Canto VII of Purgatory:

He who the lowest on the ground among them
Sits looking upward, is the Marquis William,
For whose sake Alessandria and her war
Make Monferrat and Canavese weep

== Succession ==
William left a son, John, who inherited the marquisate. The lands he inherited were divided by years of constant war and few communes remained faithful. Sent to Saluzzo for his safety, John stayed there a year.

William's body was given back to his family and was buried in the Cistercian abbey of Santa Maria di Lucedio, alongside his father. His obituary remembers him as fundator huius monasterii ("founder of this monastery"), although in reality, he was just a member of the founding family.

== Legacy ==
The marquisate of Montferrat was torn to pieces by the incessant expansionistic wars of William VII's reign. Chivasso, the centre of the Marquis' power, the veritable capital and seat of the marca Aleramica, was but an unimportant provincial town at the time. Never again would the Aleramici succeed in establishing their authority over the Piedmont.

The war with Charles of Sicily, the other chief objective, after Piedmont, of William's rule, was essential to the defence of his domain. The victory at Roccavione did not, however, sustain his power in the Piedmont.

Despite these political and military failures, William's liberality was praised by his contemporaries. He ran a government without oppression or corruption attaching to his name.

== Sources ==
- Alighieri, Dante; Longfellow, Henry Wadsworth (1867). The Divine Comedy of Dante Alighieri translated by Henry Wadsworth Longfellow. Authorized Edition. Vol. v. 2. Leipzig: B. Tauchnitz. OCLC 794818941.
- Howell, Margaret (2001) [1997]. Eleanor of Provence : queenship in thirteenth-century England. Oxford: Blackwell. ISBN 9780631172864. OCLC 496678874.
- Kinkade, Richard P. (2004). "Beatrice "Contesson" of Savoy (c. 1250-1290): The Mother of Juan Manuel". La corónica: A Journal of Medieval Hispanic Languages, Literatures, and Cultures. 2, Number 3, Summer (3): 163–225. doi:10.1353/cor.2004.0017.
- Nicol, Donald M. (1994). The Byzantine Lady: Ten Portraits, 1250–1500. Cambridge and New York: Cambridge University Press. ISBN 0-521-45531-6.
- Ruud, Jay (2008). Critical Companion to Dante: A Literary Reference to His Life and Work. Infobase Publishing.
- Settia, Aldo (2003). "Guglielmo VII, marchese di Monferrato". Dizionario Biografico (in Italian). Vol. v. 60. Roma: Istituto della Enciclopedia Italiana. OCLC 940613422.
- Altschul, Michael (2019). A Baronial Family in Medieval England: The Clares, 1217-1314. Johns Hopkins University Press.

Preceded by Boniface II	Marquis of Montferrat; 1253–1292	Succeeded by John I
