= Peter of Castile, Lord of Cameros =

Spanish nobleman

Peter of Castile
- Lord of Cameros
- Arms of Infante of Castile
- Born: 1290; Valladolid
- Died: 25 June 1319 (aged 29); Pinos Puente
- Noble family: Castilian House of Ivrea
- Spouse: María of Aragon
- Issue: Blanche of Castile
- Father: Sancho IV
- Mother: María de Molina

Peter of Castile, in Spanish Pedro de Castilla (1290 – 25 June 1319), was an infante of Castile, a younger son of King Sancho IV and his wife María de Molina. He held the lordships (señoríos) of Cameros, Almazán, Berlanga, Monteagudo and Cifuentes and was the mayordomo mayor of his brother, King Ferdinand IV of Castile. During the minority of his nephew Alfonso XI, he shared the regency of Castile with his mother and uncle, John el de Tarifa, between 1313 and his death.

Peter married María, a daughter of King James II of Aragon. Their only child, Blanche, was born after Peter's death. Although she was betrothed to King Peter I of Portugal, the marriage never took place.

In 1313, an agreement reached at Palazuelos divided the regency of the young Alfonso XI between Peter, John and María, with the men being described as tutores. This was confirmed by a cortes at Burgos in 1315. Throughout the disputes over the regency in the years 1312–15 that often devolved into open conflict, Peter supported his mother and was often at odds with his uncle.

In 1316, Peter led a military expedition to the frontier of the Kingdom of Granada. According to Christian sources, he won a great victory in the field, but unsuccessfully besieged two castles. Muslims sources mention no victory. In 1317, he again invaded Granada, relieving the siege of Gibraltar and capturing the castle of Bélmez de la Moraleda. In 1319, having received papal approval for a crusade against Granada, Peter and John jointly led an expedition to besiege the fortress of Tíscar. They separated their armies and were ambushed by a Muslim relief force. Both Peter and John were killed in the ensuing rout, known as the Disaster of the Vega de Granada.
