= Alfonso X of Castile =

King of Castile and León from 1252 to 1284

Alfonso X
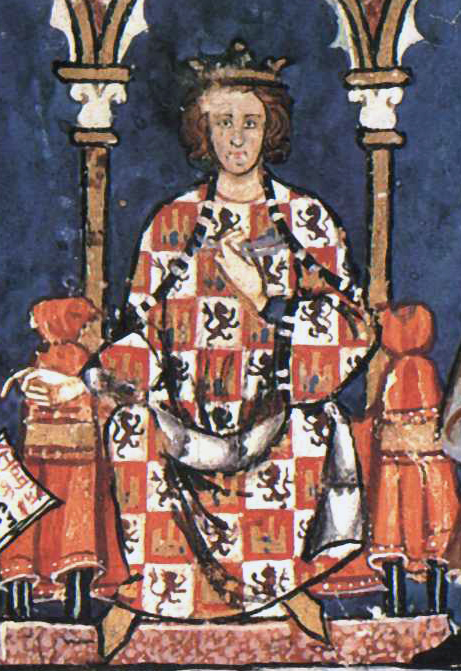
- Portrait of Alfonso X from the Libro de los juegos (1283)

King of Castile and León
- Reign: 1 June 1252 – 4 April 1284
- Predecessor: Ferdinand III
- Successor: Sancho IV
- Born: 23 November 1221; Toledo, Kingdom of Castile
- Died: 4 April 1284 (aged 62); Seville, Kingdom of Castile
- Burial: Cathedral of Seville
- Spouse: Violant of Aragon (m. 1249)
- Issue among others...: Berengaria, Lady of Guadalajara; Beatrice, Marchioness of Monferrat; Ferdinand de la Cerda; Sancho IV, King of Castile; Peter, Lord of Ledesma; John, Lord of Valencia de Campos; Violant, Lady of Biscay; James, Lord of Cameros (ill.) Beatrice, Queen of Portugal (ill.) Alfonso Fernández
- House: House of Burgundy
- Father: Ferdinand III of Castile
- Mother: Elisabeth of Swabia

Alfonso X (also known as the Wise, Spanish: el Sabio; 23 November 1221 – 4 April 1284) was King of Castile, León and Galicia from 1 June 1252 until his death in 1284. During the election of 1257, a dissident faction chose him to be king of Germany on 1 April. He renounced his claim to Germany in 1275, and in creating an alliance with the Kingdom of England in 1254, his claim on the Duchy of Gascony as well.

Alfonso's scientific interests—he is sometimes nicknamed the Astrologer (el Astrólogo)—led him to sponsor the creation of the Alfonsine tables, and the Alphonsus crater on the Moon is named after him. He also sponsored the work of historians who, for the first time since Isidore of Seville in c. 600, placed Spain in the context of world history. As a lawmaker he introduced the first vernacular law code in Castile, the Siete Partidas. He created the Mesta, an association of sheep farmers in the central plain, but debased the coinage to finance his claim to the German crown. He fought a successful war with Portugal, but a less successful one with Granada. The end of his reign was marred by a civil war with his eldest surviving son, the future Sancho IV, which continued after his death.

== Life ==
=== Early life ===
Alfonso was born on 23 November 1221 in Toledo, Kingdom of Castile. He was the eldest son of Ferdinand III and Elizabeth (Beatrice) of Swabia. His mother was the paternal cousin of Holy Roman Emperor Frederick II, to whom Alfonso is often compared. His maternal grandparents were Philip of Swabia and Irene Angelina. Little is known about his upbringing, but he was most likely raised in Toledo. For the first nine years of his life Alfonso was only heir to Castile until his paternal grandfather king Alfonso IX of León died and his father united the kingdoms of Castile and León. He began his career as a soldier, under the command of his father, when he was sixteen years old.

After the accession of King Theobald I of Navarre, Ferdinand tried to arrange a marriage for Alfonso with Theobald's daughter, Blanche, but the move was unsuccessful. At the same time, he had a romantic relationship with Mayor Guillén de Guzmán, who bore him a daughter, Beatrice. In 1240, he married Mayor Guillén de Guzmán, but the marriage was later annulled and their issue declared illegitimate. During the 1240s, alongside his father, he conquered several Muslim strongholds in Al-Andalus, including Murcia, Alicante and Cádiz.

In 1249, Alfonso married Violante, the daughter of King James I of Aragon and Violant of Hungary, although betrothed already in 1246.

=== Reign ===
Alfonso succeeded his father as King of Castile and León in 1252. The following year he invaded Portugal, capturing the region of the Algarve. King Afonso III of Portugal had to surrender. Despite this Afonso III reached an agreement with Alfonso X that in consenting to marry Alfonso X's daughter, Beatrice of Castile, the captured land would be returned to their heirs. In 1261 Alfonso X captured Jerez. In 1263 he returned Algarve to the King of Portugal and signed the Treaty of Badajoz (1267).

In 1254 Alfonso X signed a treaty of alliance with King Henry III of England, supporting him in the war against King Louis IX of France. In the same year Alfonso's half-sister, Eleanor, married Henry's son Edward: with this act Alfonso renounced forever all claim to the Duchy of Gascony, to which Castile had been a pretender since the marriage of Alfonso VIII of Castile to Eleanor of England.

==== Imperial election ====
In 1256, on the death of William II of Holland, Alfonso's descent from the Hohenstaufen through his mother, a daughter of Philip of Swabia, gave him a claim to the German crown through the Hohenstaufen line. Alfonso's election as German king by the prince-electors encouraged him to enter into complicated schemes that involved excessive expenses but never to success. Alfonso never travelled to Germany, and his alliance with the Italian Ghibelline Lord Ezzelino IV da Romano deprived him of the support of Pope Alexander IV. His rival, Richard of Cornwall, went to Germany and was crowned in 1257 at Aachen.

To obtain money, Alfonso debased the coinage and then endeavoured to prevent a rise in prices by an arbitrary tariff. The little trade that took place in his dominions was ruined, and the burghers and peasants were deeply offended. His nobles, whom he tried to cow by sporadic acts of violence, rebelled against him in 1272. Reconciliation with the nobles was brought about by Alfonso's son Ferdinand in 1273.

After Richard of Cornwell's death, the German princes elected Rudolph of Habsburg (1273), Alfonso being declared deposed by Pope Gregory X. In 1275 Alfonso tried to meet with his imperial vicar in Italy, William VII of Montferrat (who had succeeded Ezzelino), and his Ghibelline allies in Piedmont and Lombardy to celebrate the victory against the Guelph Charles I of Anjou and be crowned in Lombardy. However, he was halted in his imperial ambitions in Provence by the Pope who, after a long negotiation, obtained Alfonso's oral renunciation of any claims to the Holy Roman Empire.

==== Civil war ====
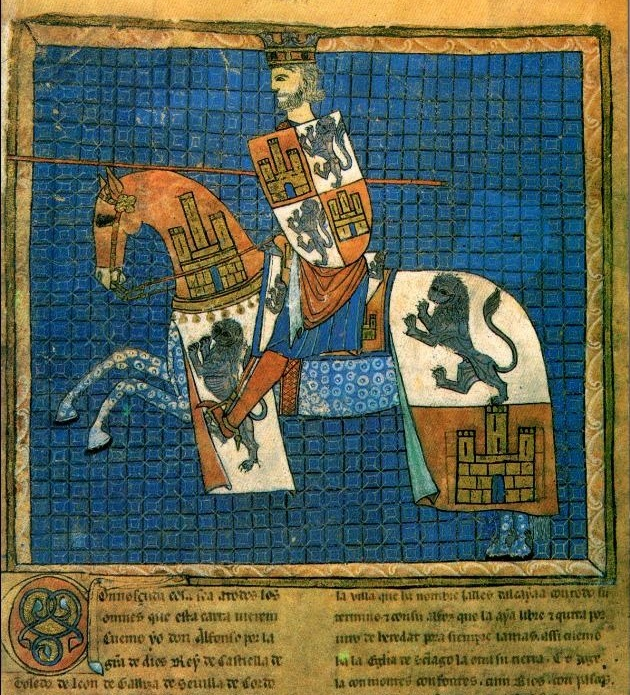
Portrait of Alfonso X from the codex Tumbo 'A' de Santiago (Dated between 1229 and 1255)

Throughout his reign, Alfonso contended with his nobles, particularly the families of Nuño González de Lara, Diego López de Haro and Esteban Fernández de Castro, all of whom were formidable soldiers and instrumental in maintaining Castile's military strength in its frontier territories. According to some scholars Alfonso lacked the singleness of purpose required by a ruler who would devote himself to organization and also the combination of firmness with temper needed for dealing with his nobles although this is not a view taken by all. Others have argued that his efforts were too singularly focused on the diplomatic and financial arrangements surrounding his bid to become Holy Roman Emperor.

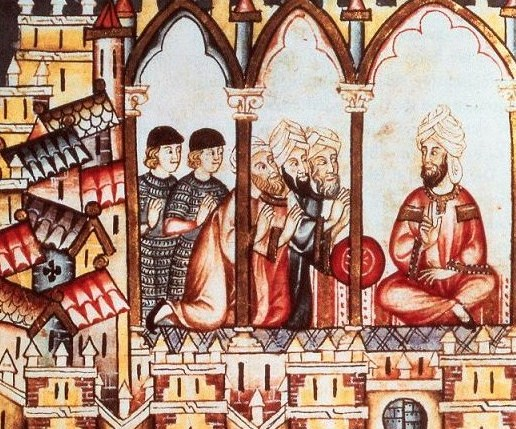
Castilian ambassadors meeting Almohad caliph Abu Hafs Umar al-Murtada, from the Cantigas de Santa María

Alfonso's eldest son, Ferdinand, died in 1275 at the Battle of Écija against the Moroccan and Granadan invasion armies, leaving two infant sons. Alfonso's second son, Sancho, claimed to be the new heir, in preference to the children of Ferdinand de la Cerda, basing his claim on an old Castilian custom, that of proximity of blood and agnatic seniority. Alfonso preferred to leave the throne to his grandsons, but Sancho had the support of the nobility. A bitter civil war broke out resulting in Alfonso's being forced in 1282 to accept Sancho as his heir instead of his young grandsons; only the cities of Seville, Murcia and Badajoz remained faithful to him. Son and nobles alike supported the Moors when he tried to unite the nation in a crusade; and when he allied himself with Abu Yusuf Yakub, the ruling Marinid sultan of Morocco, they denounced him as an enemy of the faith. A reaction in his favour was beginning in his latter days, but he died defeated and deserted at Seville in 1284, leaving a will, by which he endeavoured to exclude Sancho, and a heritage of civil war.

==== Economic policy ====
In 1273, he created the Mesta, an association of some 3,000 petty and great sheep holders in Castile, in reaction to less wool being exported from the traditional sites in England. This organization later became exceedingly powerful in the country (as wool became Castile's first major exportable commodity and reported a trade surplus, called "white gold", as the wool amount was critical to the health of the population during the winter), and eventually its privileges were to prove a deadly wound in the Castilian economy. One side effect of the quickly expanding sheep herds was the decimation to the Castilian farmland through which the sheep grazed.

The original function of the Mesta was to separate the fields from the sheep-ways linking grazing areas.

==== Legislative activity ====
As a ruler, Alfonso showed legislative capacity, and a wish to provide the kingdoms expanded under his father with a code of laws and a consistent judicial system. The Fuero Real or royal charter which endeavoured to codify these laws was probably his work. He began one of medieval Europe's most comprehensive law codes, the Siete Partidas, which, however, thwarted by the nobility of Castile, was only promulgated by his great-grandson. Because of this, and because the Partidas remain fundamental law in the American Southwest, he is one of the 23 lawmakers depicted in the House of Representatives chamber of the United States Capitol.

==== Military training ====
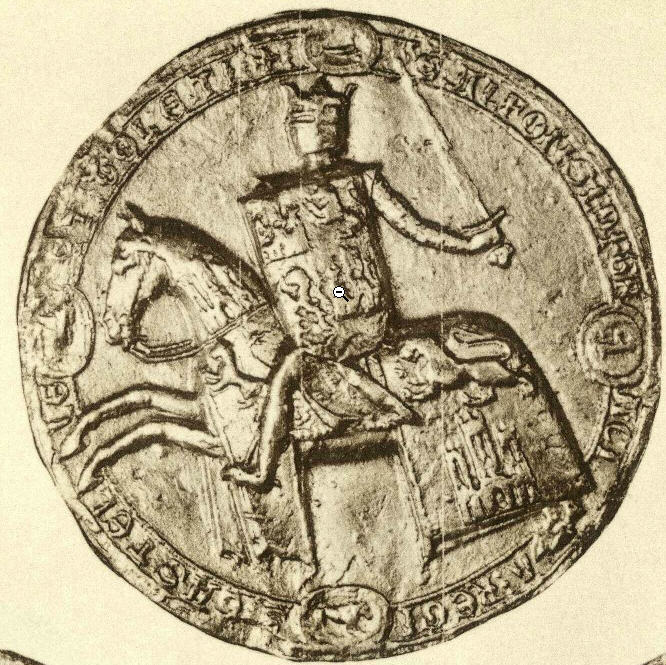
Equestrian seal of Alfonso X of Castile

From a young age Alfonso X showed an interest in military life and chivalry. In 1231 Alfonso traveled with Pérez de Castron on a military campaign in lower Andalusia. Writing in Estoria de España, Alfonso describes having seen St. James on a white horse with a white banner and a legion of knights fighting a war above the soldiers of Spain. This vision of a heavenly army fighting in Jerez and participation in military campaigns likely left Alfonso X with a high degree of knowledge and respect for military operations and chivalric knights. Alfonso's respect for chivalry can also be seen in his writing of Spanish law. Spanish Chivalric conduct was codified in the Siete Partidas (2,21) where he wrote that knights should be, "of good linage and distinguished by gentility, wisdom, understanding, loyalty, courage, moderation, justice, prowess, and the practical knowledge necessary to assess the quality of horse and arms (Siete Partidas, 21,1–10)." These efforts to make a codified standard of chivalric conduct were likely meant to both encourage strength of arms (prowess) and to restrain the use of violence for only just (state-sponsored) usage.

== Court culture ==
King Alfonso X developed a court culture that encouraged cosmopolitan learning. Alfonso had many works previously written in Arabic and Latin translated into vernacular Castilian in his court. Alfonso "turned to the vernacular for the kind of intellectual commitments that formerly were inconceivable outside Latin." He is credited with encouraging the extensive written use of the Castilian language instead of Latin as the language used in courts, churches, and in books and official documents (although his father, Ferdinand III, had begun to use it for some documents). This translation of Arabic and Classic documents into vernacular encouraged the development of Spanish sciences, literature, and philosophy.

=== Translations ===
From the beginning of his reign, Alfonso employed Jewish, Christian and Muslim scholars at his court, primarily for the purpose of translating books from Arabic and Hebrew into Latin and Castilian, although he always insisted on personally supervising the translations. This group of scholars formed his royal scriptorium, continuing the tradition of the twelfth-century Escuela de Traductores de Toledo (Toledo School of Translators). Their final output promoted Castilian as a learning language both in science and literature, and established the foundations of the new Spanish language. This evolved version of the Castilian language also acquired significant relevance in the royal chancery, where it came to replace Latin, which until then had been the language commonly used for royal diplomacy in Castile and León.

The very first translation, commissioned by his brother, Fernando de la Cerda—who had extensive experience, both diplomatic and military, among the Muslims of southern Iberia and north Africa—was a Castilian version of the animal fable Kalila wa-Dimna, a book that belongs to the genre of wisdom literature labeled Mirrors for Princes: stories and sayings meant to instruct the monarch in proper and effective governance.

The primary intellectual work of these scholars centered on astronomy and astrology. The early period of Alfonso's reign saw the translation of selected works of magic (Lapidario, Picatrix, Libro de las formas et las ymagenes) all translated by a Jewish scholar named Yehuda ben Moshe (Yhuda Mosca, in the Old Spanish source texts). These were all highly ornate manuscripts (only the Lapidario survives in its entirety) containing what was believed to be secret knowledge on the magical properties of stones and talismans. In addition to these books of astral magic, Alfonso ordered the translation of well-known Arabic astrological compendia, including the Libro de las cruzes and Libro conplido en los iudizios de las estrellas. The first of these was, ironically, translated from Latin (it was used among the Visigoths), into Arabic, and then back into Castilian and Latin. Most of the texts first translated at this time survive in only one manuscript each.

=== Astronomy ===
As an intellectual he gained considerable scientific fame based on his encouragement of astronomy, which included astrology at the time and the Ptolemaic cosmology as known to him through the Arabs. He surrounded himself with mostly Jewish translators who rendered Arabic scientific texts into Castilian at Toledo. His fame extends to the preparation of the Alfonsine tables, based on calculations of al-Zarqali, "Arzachel". Alexander Bogdanov maintained that these tables formed the basis for Copernicus's development of a heliocentric understanding in astronomy. Because of this work, the lunar crater Alphonsus is named after him. One famous, but apocryphal, quote attributed to him upon his hearing an explanation of the extremely complicated mathematics required to demonstrate Ptolemy's theory of astronomy was "If the Lord Almighty had consulted me before embarking on creation thus, I should have recommended something simpler." Gingerich (1990) says that a form of this alleged quotation was mentioned (but rejected) as early as the 16th century by the historian Jerónimo de Zurita, and that Soriano Viguera (1926) states that "nothing of the sort can be found in Alfonso's writings." Nevertheless, Dean Acheson (U.S. Secretary of State, 1949–1953) used it as the basis for the title and epigraph of his memoir Present at the Creation.

=== Chronicles ===
Alfonso also commissioned a compilation of chronicles, the Crónica general, completed in 1264. This chronicle sought to establish a general history and drew from older chronicles, folklore and Arabic sources. This work enjoyed renewed popularity starting in the sixteenth century, when there was a revival of interest in history; Florián de Ocampo published a new edition and Lorenzo de Sepúlveda used it as the chief source of his popular romances. Sepúlveda wrote a number of romances having Alfonso X as their hero.

=== Historical works ===
Alfonso's court compiled in Castilian a work titled General Estoria. This work was an attempt at a world history that drew from many sources and included translations from the Vulgate Old Testament mixed with myths and histories from the classical world, mostly Egypt, Greece, and Rome. This world history was left incomplete, however, and so it stops at the birth of Christ. The main significance of this work lies in the translations from Latin into Castilian. Much like his chronicles, the ability of Alfonso's court to compile writings from a variety of cultures and translate them into Castilian left a historic impact on Spain.

Alfonso X is credited with the first depiction of an hórreo, a typical granary from the northwest of the Iberian Peninsula. The oldest document containing an image of an hórreo is Alfonso's Cantigas de Santa Maria (song CLXXXVII) from XII A.C. In this depiction, three rectangular hórreos of Gothic style are illustrated.

=== Games ===
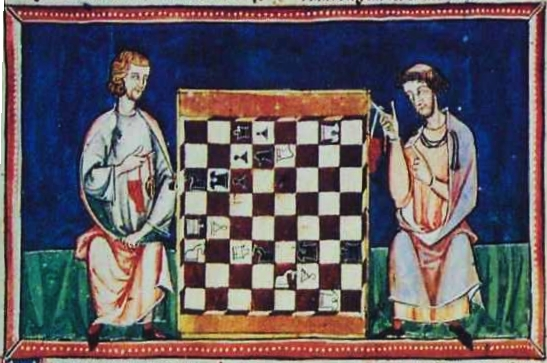
Chess problem#35

Alfonso also had the Libro de ajedrez, dados, y tablas ("Libro de los Juegos" (The Book of Games)) translated into Castilian from Arabic and added illustrations with the goal of perfecting the work. It was completed in 1283. The Libro de juegos contains an extensive collection of writings on chess, with over 100 chess problems and chess variants.

=== Music ===
Alfonso X commissioned or co-authored numerous works of music during his reign. These works included Cantigas d'escarnio e maldicer and the vast compilation Cantigas de Santa Maria ("Songs to the Virgin Mary"), which was written in Galician–Portuguese and figures among the most important of his works. The Cantigas de Santa Maria form one of the largest collections of vernacular monophonic songs to survive from the Middle Ages. They consist of 420 poems with musical notation. The poems are for the most part on miracles attributed to the Virgin Mary. One of the miracles Alfonso relates is his own healing in Puerto de Santa María.

== Family ==
Violante was twelve or thirteen years old at the time of her marriage to Alfonso; she produced no children for several years and it was feared that she was barren. Alfonso almost had their marriage annulled, but they went on to have eleven children:

1. Berengaria (1253 – after 1284). She was betrothed to Louis, the son and heir of King Louis IX of France, but her fiancé died prematurely in 1260. She entered the convent in Las Huelgas, where she was living in 1284.
2. Beatrice (1254–1280). She married William VII, Marquess of Montferrat.
3. Ferdinand de la Cerda, Infante of Castile (23 October 1255 – 25 July 1275). He married Blanche, the daughter of King Louis IX of France, by whom he had two children. Because he predeceased his father, his younger brother Sancho succeeded to the throne.
4. Eleanor (1257–1275)
5. Sancho IV of Castile (13 May 1258 – 1295)
6. Constance (1258 – 22 August 1280), a nun at Las Huelgas.
7. Peter, Lord of Ledesma (June 1260 – 10 October 1283)
8. John, Lord of Valencia de Campos (March or April 1262 – 25 June 1319).
9. Isabella, died young.
10. Violant (1265–1296). She married Diego López V de Haro, Lord of Biscay
11. James, Lord of Cameros (August 1266 – 9 August 1284)

Alfonso X also had several illegitimate children. With Mayor Guillén de Guzmán, daughter of Guillén Pérez de Guzmán and of María González Girón, he fathered:

- Beatrice, married King Afonso III of Portugal.

With Elvira Rodríguez de Villada, daughter of Rodrigo Fernández de Villada, he fathered:

- Alfonso Fernández de Castilla (1242–1281), also known as el Niño, he held the title of "Señor de Molina y Mesa" through his marriage with Blanca Alfonso de Molina.

With María Alfonso de León, his aunt, the illegitimate daughter of the King Alfonso IX of León and Teresa Gil de Soverosa he had:

- Berenguela Alfonso of Castile, who married Pedro Núñez de Guzmán in 1264, but died young leaving behind no descendants.

Alfonso X of Castile Castilian House of Ivrea Cadet branch of the House of Ivrea Born: 23 November 1221 Died: 4 April 1284
Regnal titles
Preceded by Ferdinand III	King of Castile and León; 1252–1284	Succeeded by Sancho IV
Preceded by William	King of Germany; 1 April 1257–1275; With: Richard and Rudolph as contenders	Succeeded by Rudolph I
