= Castilian House of Burgundy =

House of Burgundy, 1126 to 1369

House of Burgundy Casa de Borgoña
- Parent house: House of Ivrea; House of Jiménez (maternal)
- Country: Crown of Castile, Kingdom of Castile, Kingdom of León
- Founded: 1126; 900 years ago
- Founder: Raymond of Burgundy
- Final ruler: Peter of Castile
- Titles: King of Castile and Toledo; King of León and Galicia
- Dissolution: 1369; 657 years ago
- Cadet branches: House of Trastámara (illegitimate); House of Noronha (illegitimate); House of La Cerda; House of Enríquez (illegitimate); House of Valencia; House of Ponce de León; Duke of Arcos (illegitimate)

The House of Burgundy, also known as the Castilian House of Ivrea, is a cadet branch of the House of Ivrea descended from Raymond of Burgundy. Raymond married Urraca, the eldest legitimate daughter of Alfonso VI of León and Castile of the House of Jiménez. Two years after Raymond's death, Urraca succeeded her father and became queen of Castile and León; Urraca's and Raymond's offspring in the legitimate line ruled the kingdom from 1126 until the death of Peter of Castile in 1369, while their descendants in an illegitimate line, the House of Trastámara, would rule Castile and Aragón into the 16th century.

== History ==
=== Origins ===
Raymond was the fourth son of William I, Count of Burgundy (from the House of Ivrea) and arrived in the Iberian peninsula probably in 1086 with the army of Odo I, Duke of Burgundy, who besieged the city Tudela, Navarre. In April 1087 the army abandoned the siege and returned home, but Odo, Raymond and Henry of Burgundy (Raymond's cousin) went west at the court of Alfonso VI king of Castile and León. There, Odo arranged the marriage of king's first daughter, Urraca, to Raymond in 1087; the couple received the county of Galicia as dowry. In 1093 Alfonso VI married an illegitimate daughter Teresa to Henry and gave them the county of Portugal, which evolved to a kingdom. In 1107 Raymond died, followed the next year by Sancho, the king's only son. Now his presumptive heiress, Urraca was married to Alfonso I of Navarre and Aragón, who was promised the kingdom to the exclusion of Urraca's son by Raymond. The couple proved incompatible, and following Alfonso VI's death in 1109, Urraca reigned as queen while resisting efforts by both her husband and her son by Raymond to take the crown. The latter succeeded on her death, becoming Alfonso VII, first king of Castile and León from the Castilian House of Ivrea.

=== Kings of Castile and León ===
Alfonso VII partitioned the kingdom to his sons: Sancho III received Castile & Toledo and Ferdinand received León & Galicia. The kingdoms remained divided under their sons Alfonso VIII of Castile and Alfonso IX of León, but in 1197 the latter married the daughter of the former, so following the death of her teenage brother, Henry I of Castile, this kingdom passed to her son by Alfonso IX, Ferdinand III. He permanently reunited the kingdoms on the death of his father and passed them to his own son, Alfonso X.

Alfonso X's eldest son Ferdinand died in 1275 leaving two sons, but the king's second son Sancho claimed to be the new heir. The king preferred Ferdinand's sons, but the nobility supported Sancho and a civil war began. The descendants of Ferdinand form the House of la Cerda. Alfonso X died in 1284 and finally his second son succeeded him, as Sancho IV. The grandson of Sancho IV, i.e. Alfonso XI, had legitimate son Peter of Castile and some illegitimate sons: Henry, Fadrique, etc. Henry attacked Peter with a host of soldiers of fortune in 1366. The Castilian Civil War followed: Peter was besieged at the fortress of Montiel. During the negotiations, Peter entered the tent of Henry's envoy, where Henry, which was hidden there, attacked him and killed him. Peter had no legitimate sons, and Henry became the new king as Henry II and was the founder of the House of Trastámara. His brother Fadrique became the founder of the House of Enríquez.

== Family tree of Castilian House of Ivrea ==
=== Branches ===
- House of Ivrea, Kings of Castile († 1369)
  - House of la Cerda, Pretenders to Castile († 1389)
    - Second House of Lara, Lords of Lara († 1361)
  - (illegitimate) House of Trastamara, Kings of Castile († 1504)
    - Third house of Aragon, Kings of Aragon († 1516)
      - (illegitimate) House of Aragona, Kings of Naples († 1550)
        - (illegitimate) Aragona, Dukes of Bisceglie († 1512)
        - (illegitimate) Aragona, Dukes of Montalto († 1610)
        - (illegitimate) Aragona, Marquesses of Gerace († 1529)
      - (illegitimate) Aragon, lords of Ballobar († 17th c.)
      - (illegitimate) Aragon Gurrea, Dukes of Villahermosa († 1761)
      - House of Aragon, Dukes of Segorbe († 1608)
    - (illegitimate) Noroña, Counts of Gijon
      - Second House of Meneses, Counts and Marquesses of Vila Real, Dukes of Caminha († 1668)
        - Noronha, Counts of Linhares († 1647)
        - Castro, Counts of Monsanto and Marquesses of Cascais († 1745)
    - (illegitimate) Henriques, lords of las Alcáçovas
  - (illegitimate) House of Enríquez, Lords and Dukes of Medina de Rioseco († 1739)
  - (illegitimate) Téllez de Castilla, Lords of Aguilar de Campoo († 1449)
  - (illegitimate) Albuquerque, Counts of Albuquerque († 1445)
  - Castilla, Lords of los Cameros († 1375)
  - Castilla, Lords of Ledesma († 1312)
  - Valencia, Lords of Valencia de Campos
  - Second House of Haro, Lords of Biscay († 1348)
  - House of Enríquez, lords of Puebla de los Infantes († late 14th c.)
  - House of Manuel de Villena (†1935)
  - Ponthieu, Counts of Aumale († 1302)
  - Castilla, Lords of Marchena († 14th c.)
  - Molina, Counts of Molina († 1321)
  - (illegitimate) Fernandez, lords of Castroponce († 14th c.)

=== Persons ===
William I count of Burgundy; HOUSE OF IVREA
Stephen I count of Burgundy	Raymond; CASTILIAN HOUSE OF IVREA	Urraca queen of Castile & León; HOUSE OF JIMÉNEZ
Alfonso VII king of Castile & León
Sancho III king of Castile	Ferdinand II king of León
Alphonso VIII king of Castile	Alfonso IX king of León
Ferdinand of Castile heir apparent	Henry I king of Castile	Ferdinand of León heir apparent	Ferdinand III king of Castile & León	Alfonso lord of Molina	(illeg.) Rodrigo Alfonso lord of Alexer	(illeg.) Martín Alfonso
(1) Alfonso X king of Castile & León	Frederick prince of Castille	Henry the Senator prince of Castile	Philip archbishop of Seville	Sancho archbishop of Toledo	Manuel lord of Villiena
Ferdinand de la Cerda heir apparent HOUSE OF LA CERDA	Sancho IV king of Castile & León	Peter lord of Ledesma	John lord of Valencia de Campos	James lord of Cameros	Alfonso Fernández el Niño lord of Molina	Juan Manuel prince of Villena
Alfonso the disinherited baron of Lunel	Ferdinand lord of Lara	Ferdinand IV king of Castile-León	Peter lord of Cameros	Philip lord of Cabrera and Ribera	Juan the 𝘰𝘯𝘦-𝘦𝘺𝘦𝘥 lord of Cuéllar
Alfonso of Spain baron of Lunel	Luis admiral of France	Juan Alfonso lord of Gibraleón	Juan Núñez lord of Lara	Alfonso XI king of Castile & León
Charles constable of France, Count of Angoulême	Peter king of Castile & León	(illeg.) Henry II count of Trastámara, king of Castile & León; HOUSE OF TRASTAMARA	(illeg.) Fadrique Alfonso lord of Haro; HOUSE OF ENRÍQUEZ	(illeg.); Tello Alfonso lord of Aguilar de Campo	(illeg.); Sancho Alfonso count of Alburquerque
Alonso lord of Medina de Rioseco
Fadrique lord of Medina de Rioseco

== Gallery ==
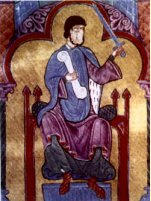
Raymond (House of Ivrea)

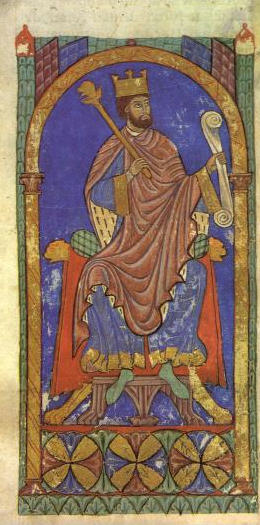
Alfonso VII the Emperor

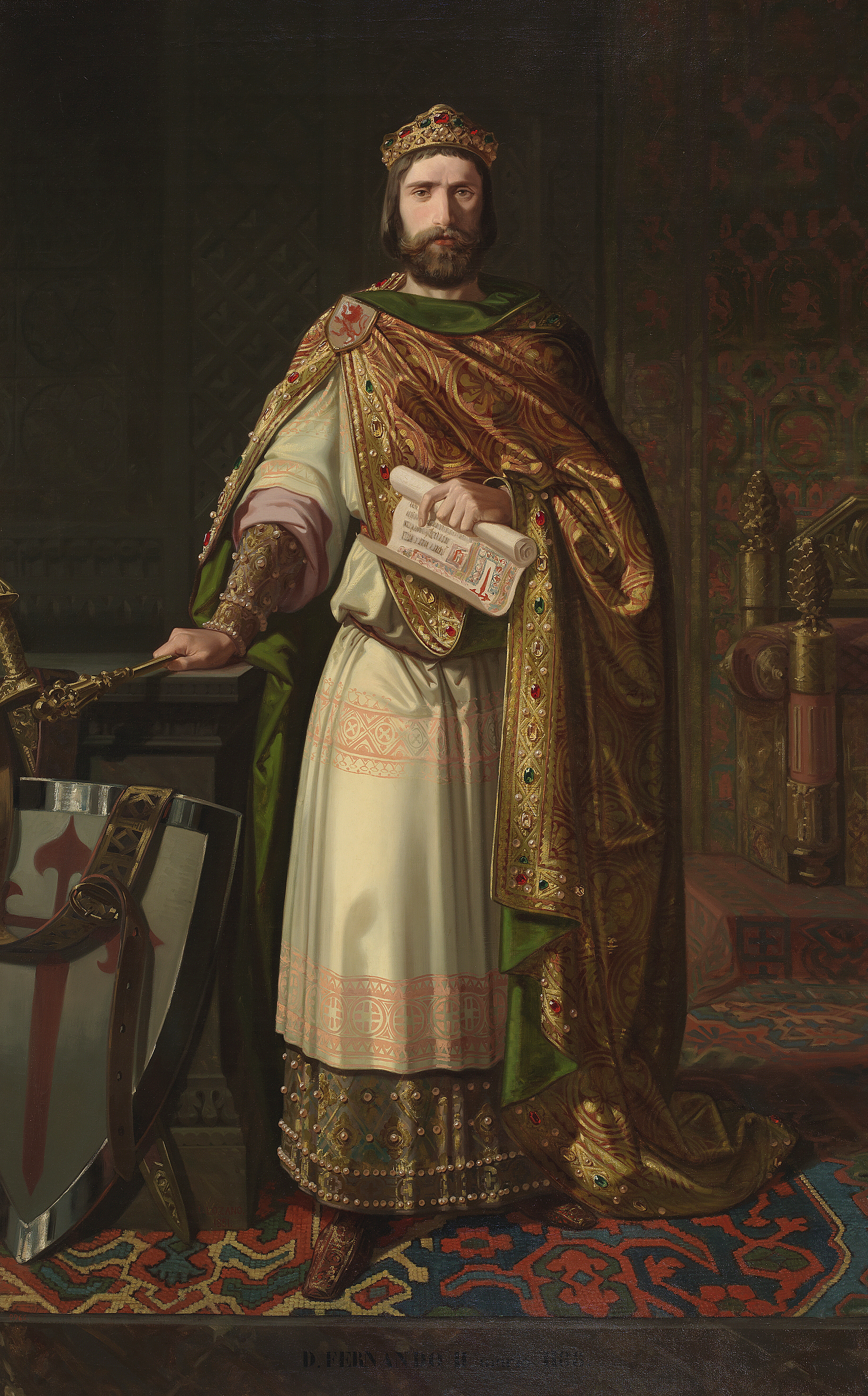
Ferdinand II of León

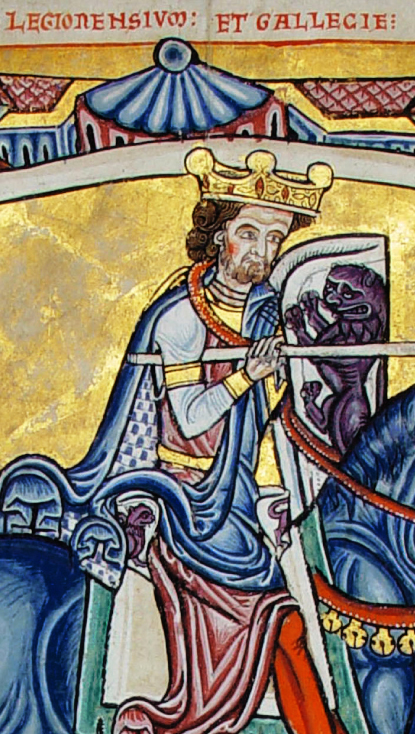
Alfonso IX of León

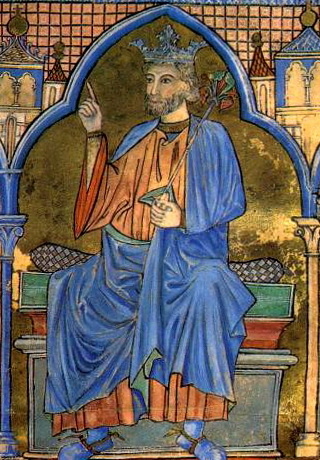
Ferdinand III the Saint

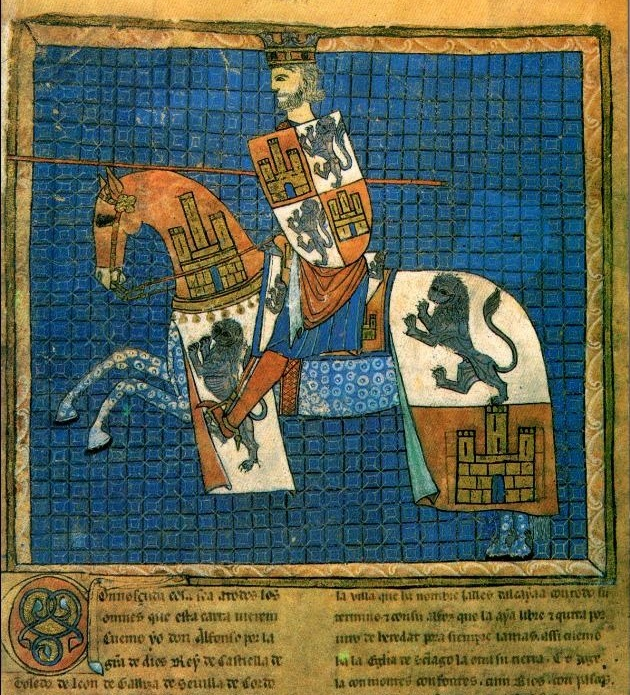
Alfonso X the Wise

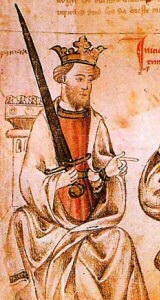
Sancho IV the Brave

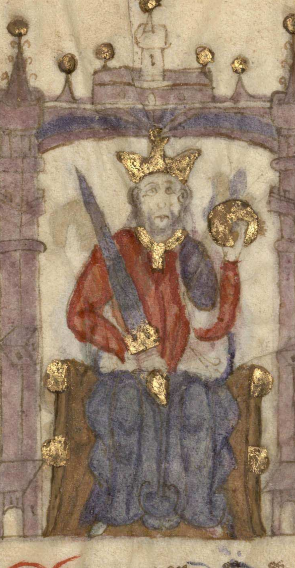
Ferdinand IV the Summoned

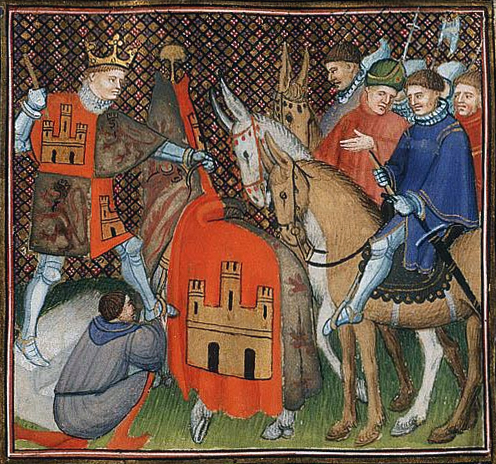
Alfonso XI the Avenger

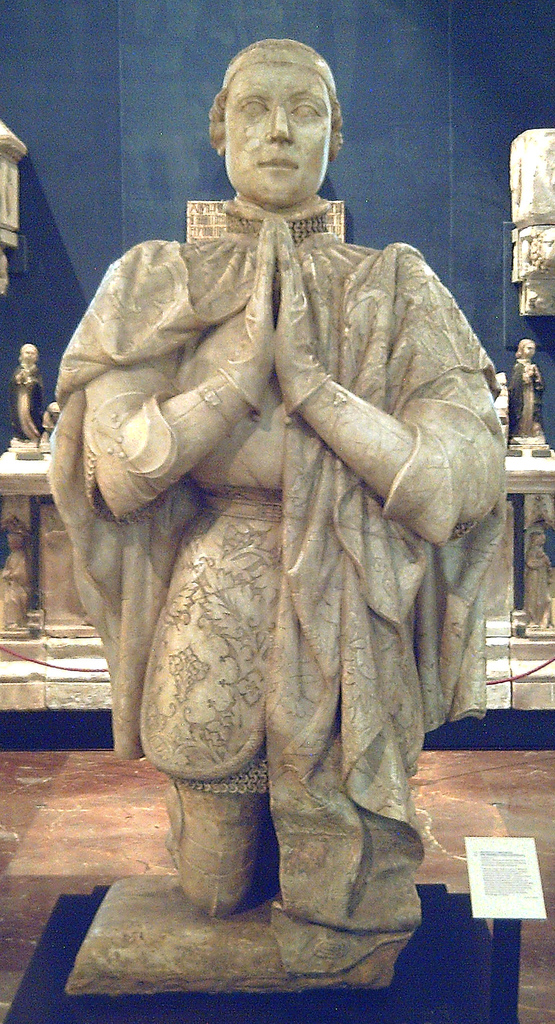
Peter the Cruel/Just

== See also ==
- Portuguese House of Burgundy
- House of Trastámara

== Notes ==
*Royal House* Castilian House of Burgundy Cadet branch of the House of Ivrea
Preceded by Jiménez dynasty	Ruling House of the Kingdom of Castile and León; 1126 – 1369	Succeeded by House of Trastámara
