= Violant of Aragon =

Queen of Castile and León from 1252 to 1284

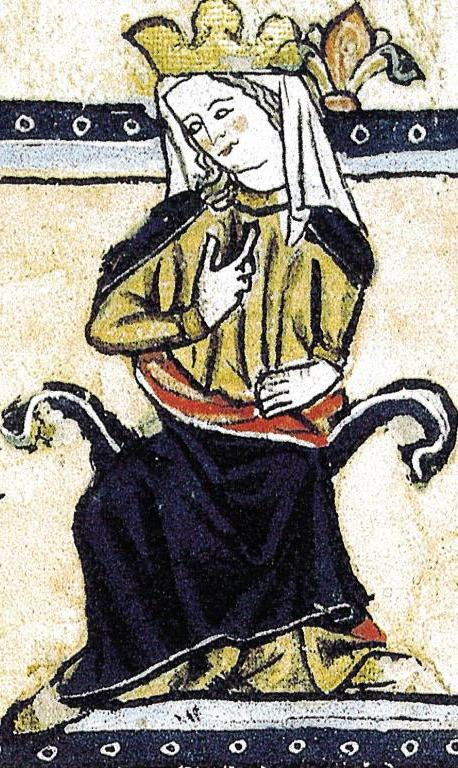
- Violant of Aragon

Queen consort of Castile and León
- Tenure: 1252–1284
- Born: 8 June 1236; Zaragoza, Kingdom of Aragon (now in Autonomous community of Aragon, Spain)
- Died: 1301 (aged 64–65); Roncesvalles, Kingdom of Navarre, France (now in Chartered Community of Navarre, Spain)
- Spouse: Alfonso X of Castile (m. 1249; died 1284)
- Issue among others...: Berengaria, Lady of Guadalajara; Beatrice, Marchioness of Monferrat; Ferdinand de la Cerda; Sancho IV, King of Castile; Peter, Lord of Ledesma; John, Lord of Valencia de Campos; Violant, Lady of Biscay; James, Lord of Cameros
- House: Barcelona
- Father: James I of Aragon
- Mother: Violant of Hungary

Violant or Violante of Aragon, also known as Yolanda of Aragon (8 June 1236 – 1301), was Queen consort of Castile and León from 1252 to 1284 as the wife of King Alfonso X of Castile.

== Life ==
Violant was born in Zaragoza, the daughter of King James I of Aragon (1213–1276) and his second wife, Violant of Hungary (ca.1215-1253). Her maternal grandparents were Andrew II of Hungary and Yolanda de Courtenay.

In January 1249, Violant married King Alfonso X of Castile at Burgos, who before his marriage, had a romantic relationship with Mayor Guillén de Guzmán who bore to him an illegitimate daughter Beatrice.

Due to Violant's young age, she was unable to get pregnant for several years. Alfonso came to believe that his wife was barren and came to even consider the possibility of asking the pope for an annulment of the marriage.

Legend has it that the Queen could not get pregnant and the doctor told her to rest. Alicante was recaptured by the Crown of Castile and the King and Queen rested in a farm located in the fields near the city, and there she became pregnant; the King decided to call the place "Pla del Bon Repos" ("Plain of good sleep"), a name that has been left to posterity and today is a suburb of Alicante.

In 1275, Violant's son and heir to Castile, Ferdinand de la Cerda, died heir to the Castilian-Leonese throne and Alfonso at first ignored the rights of Ferdinand's two sons, Alfonso and Fernando, and instead made their second son, Prince Sancho heir; he would later succeed as Sancho IV of Castile.

In response, the widow of Ferdinand, Blanche of France, enlisted the help of her brother, Philip III of France. At the same time, queen Violant sought support for her grandchildren from her brother, King Peter III of Aragon, who agreed to protect and guard them in the kingdom of Aragon, accommodating her grandchildren in the Castle of Xativa. During the reign of her son Sancho IV, and the latter's son, Ferdinand IV of Castile, Queen Violant lived almost permanently in Aragon and she supported the rights to the throne of Castile and León of her grandson, Alfonso de la Cerda.

In 1276, Violant founded the Convent of San Pablo in Valladolid. This was erected in honor of the Hungarian Order of St. Paul. Violant's mother brought some Hungarian influence on the Spanish culture, and also introduced the Order of St. Paul.

Queen Violant died in Roncesvalles, Navarre, in 1301, on her return from Rome, where she had won the Jubilee in 1300.

== Children ==
Coat of arms of Violant of Aragon as Queen Consort of Castile.

Alfonso and Violant had the following children:

1. Berengaria (1253 – after 1284). She was betrothed to Louis, the son and heir of King Louis IX of France, but her fiancé died prematurely in 1260. She entered the convent in Las Huelgas, where she was living in 1284.
2. Beatrice (1254–1280). She married William VII, Marquess of Montferrat.
3. Ferdinand de la Cerda, Infante of Castile (23 October 1255 – 25 July 1275). He married Blanche, daughter of Louis IX of France, by whom he had two children.
4. Eleanor (1257–1275)
5. Sancho IV of Castile (13 May 1258 – 1295)
6. Constance (1258 – 22 August 1280), a nun at Las Huelgas.
7. Peter, Lord of Ledesma (June 1260 – 10 October 1283)
8. John, Lord of Valencia de Campos (March or April 1262 – 25 June 1319).
9. Isabella, died young.
10. Violant (1265–1296). She married Diego López V de Haro, Lord of Biscay
11. James, Lord of Cameros (August 1266 – 9 August 1284)

Royal titles
Preceded by Jeanne of Dammartin	Queen consort of Castile and León; 1252–1284	Succeeded by Maria of Molina
