= Peter of Castile, Lord of Ledesma =

Peter of Castile
- Lord of Ledesma
- Arms of Castile and León
- Born: June 1260; Seville
- Died: 10 October 1283 (aged 23); Ledesma, Salamanca
- Noble family: Castilian House of Ivrea
- Spouse: Margaret of Narbonne
- Issue: Sancho de Castilla
- Father: Alfonso X of Castile
- Mother: Violant of Aragon

Peter of Castile (June 1260, in Seville – 10 October 1283, in Ledesma), was an infante of Castile. He was a son of Alfonso X of Castile and Violant of Aragon who was also called Yolanda or Yolante.

He was Lord (señor) of Ledesma, Alba de Tormes, Salvatierra, Miranda del Castañar, Galisteo and Granadilla.

== Biography ==
He received from his father the command of the Christian troops during the failed Siege of Algeciras (1278–79).
In 1281, Peter participated in his father's campaign against the Kingdom of Granada.

When his eldest brother, Crown Prince Ferdinand de la Cerda, died before his father, Peter supported his brother Sancho IV of Castile, against the wishes of his father, who had appointed Ferdinand's son Alfonso de la Cerda as his successor. For this, Peter was disinherited by his father.

== Marriage and issue ==
He married Margaret of Narbonne, daughter of Aimery IV of Narbonne (of the House of Lara) in 1281. They had one son

- Sancho de Castilla el de la Paz, died 1312 without issue.

He also had an illegitimate son called Sancho Pére.
